= Wyre Way =

Footpaths in Lancashire, England

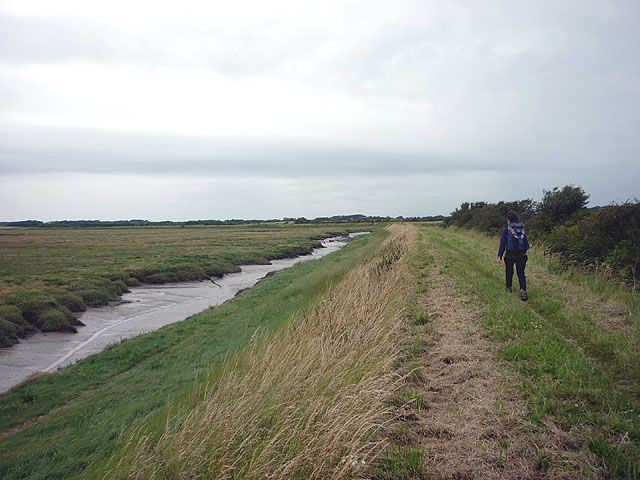
- Heading to Knott End on the Wyre Way
- Location: Borough of Wyre, Lancashire, England
- Use: Hiking
- Elevation gain/loss: 2,251 feet (686 m) gain
- Highest point: 892 feet (272 m)
- Difficulty: Moderate
- Season: All year

The Wyre Way is a series of hiking paths, largely within the Borough of Wyre, Lancashire, England. It is part of the 137-mile (220 km) Lancashire Coastal Way, established in 1991.

It contains three routes, the most easterly of which ends near the source of the River Wyre in the Forest of Bowland.

== Route ==
The first route runs between Fleetwood and Knott End (via Shard Bridge and the Wyre Estuary Ferry). It is sixteen miles. The second route, which is eleven miles, is from Shard Bridge to Garstang (via the back roads of Over Wyre). The third begins in Garstang and ends at Abbeystead Reservoir, and is eighteen miles. The highest point of the route, just before its eastern terminus, 892 feet (272 m).

The routes contain four sections: the Fleetwood Peninsula Loop, Shard Bridge to Garstang, Garstang to Abbeystead and the Tarnbrook Loop. The main starting points are the Wyre Estuary Country Park, the Shard Riverside Inn, Garstang Tourist Information, and Stoops Bridge in Abbeystead.

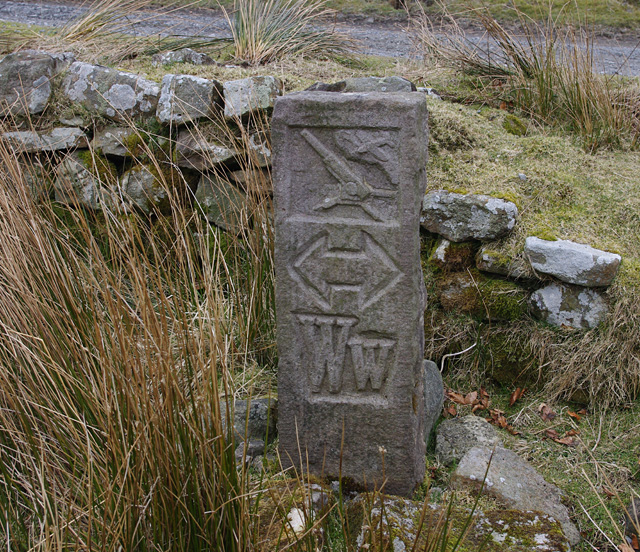
A Wyre Way waymark stone in Over Wyresdale
