= Wyre Estuary Country Park =

Park in Thornton-Cleveleys, Lancashire, England

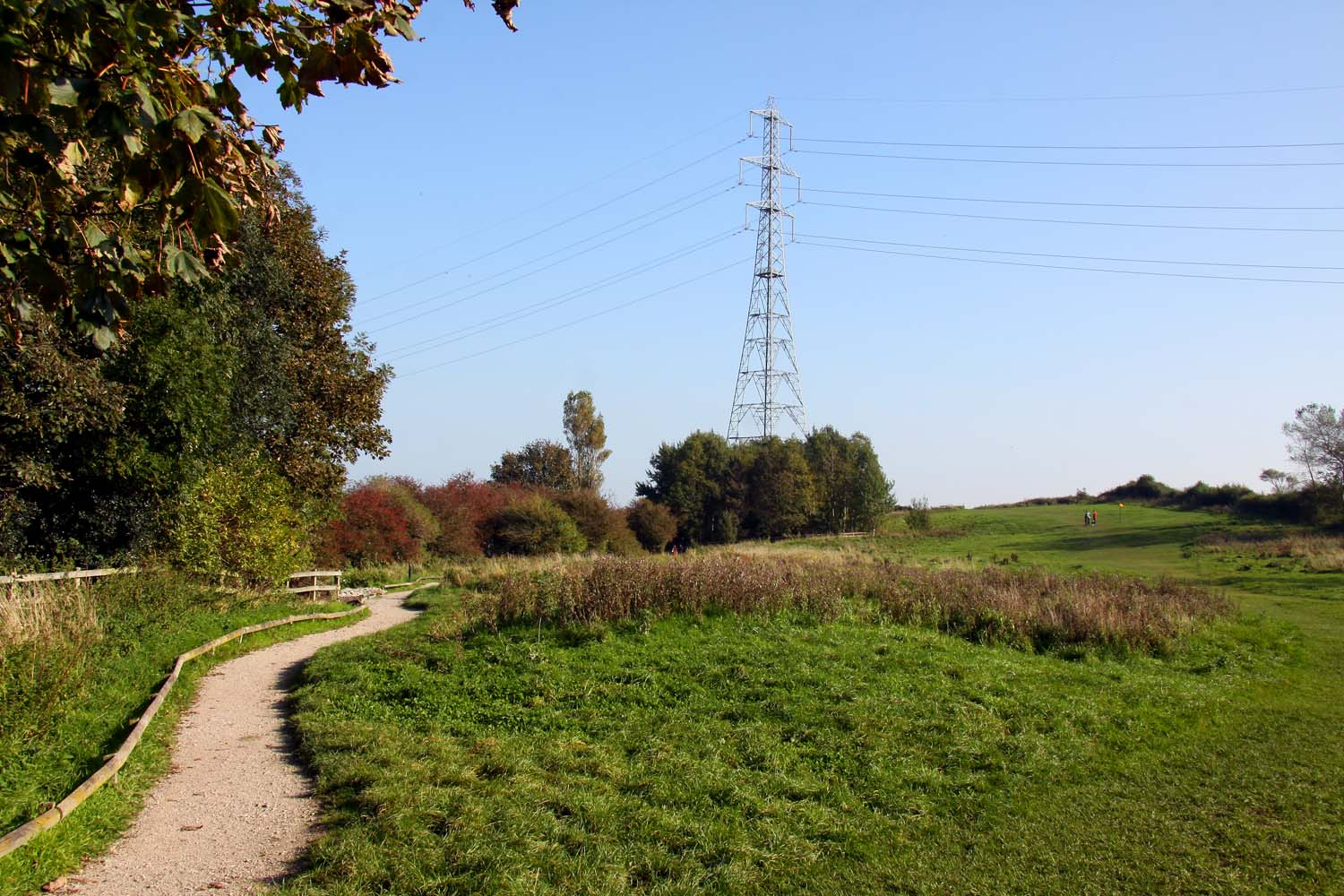
- A footpath leading south, running parallel to a riverside path to the east

- Location within the Borough of Wyre Location within Lancashire Location within England
- Interactive map of Wyre Estuary Country Park
- Type: Country park
- Location: River Road, Thornton-Cleveleys, Lancashire, England
- Coordinates: 53.8799°N 2.9796°W
- Area: 0.79 acres (0.32 ha)
- Created: 1991 (35 years ago)
- Operator: Wyre Council
- Open: Open all year

Wyre Estuary Country Park is located in Thornton-Cleveleys, Lancashire, England. Established in 1991 and covering 0.79 acres (0.32 ha), it is situated on the western banks of the 28-mile (45 km) long River Wyre, near its mouth at the Irish Sea at Fleetwood. The Wyre estuary forms part of the southern boundary of Morecambe Bay.

From the park's car park, Fleetwood can be viewed to the north, and there are also vistas across the river to South Lakeland to the northeast, Over Wyre to the east and, beyond, the Bowland Fells.

The park has received a Green Flag Award, a VisitEngland Award, as well as Northwest Britain in Bloom Gold Awards in the Large Park Category in 2023 and 2024. It part of the Wyre Way.

Cockle Hall, the former site of a cottage occupied by a family of thirteen, is located a short distance along the path. The ferryman who took people to and brought people from Wardleys Creek, on the opposite side of the river, also lived there.

== Views ==
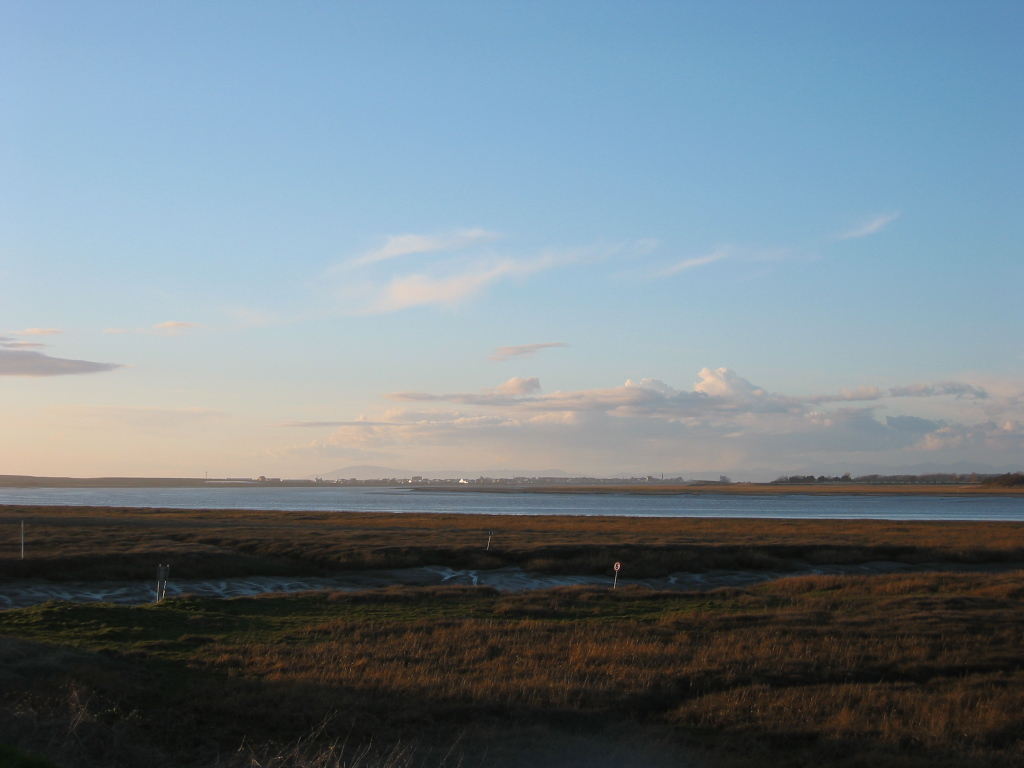
Looking northeast to the mouth of the River Wyre at Fleetwood

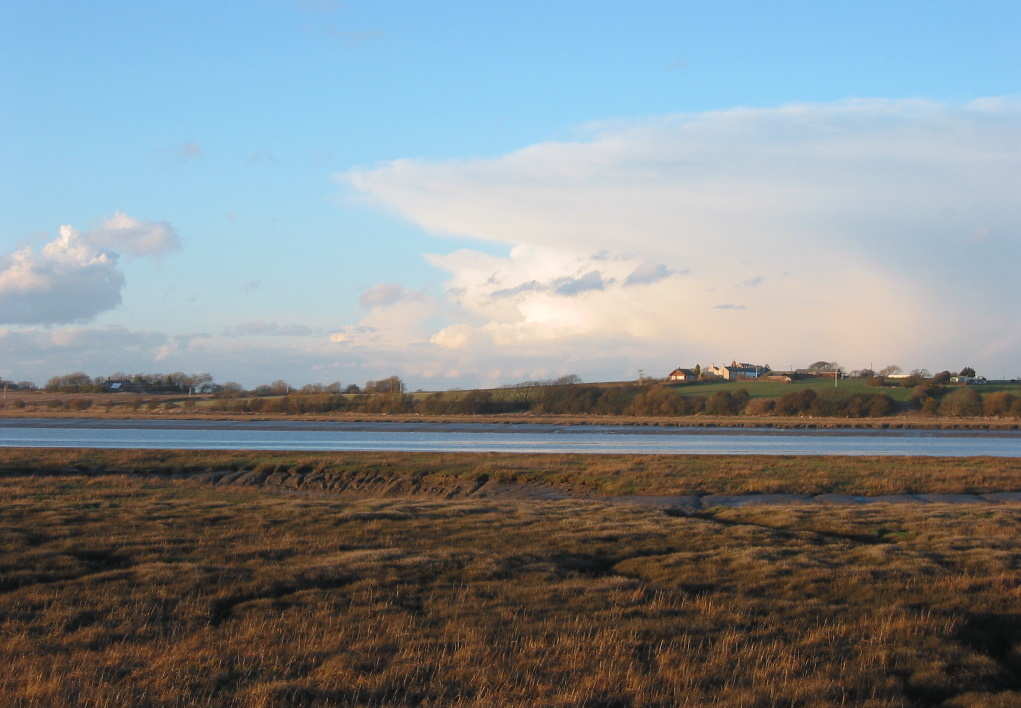
East to Over Wyre

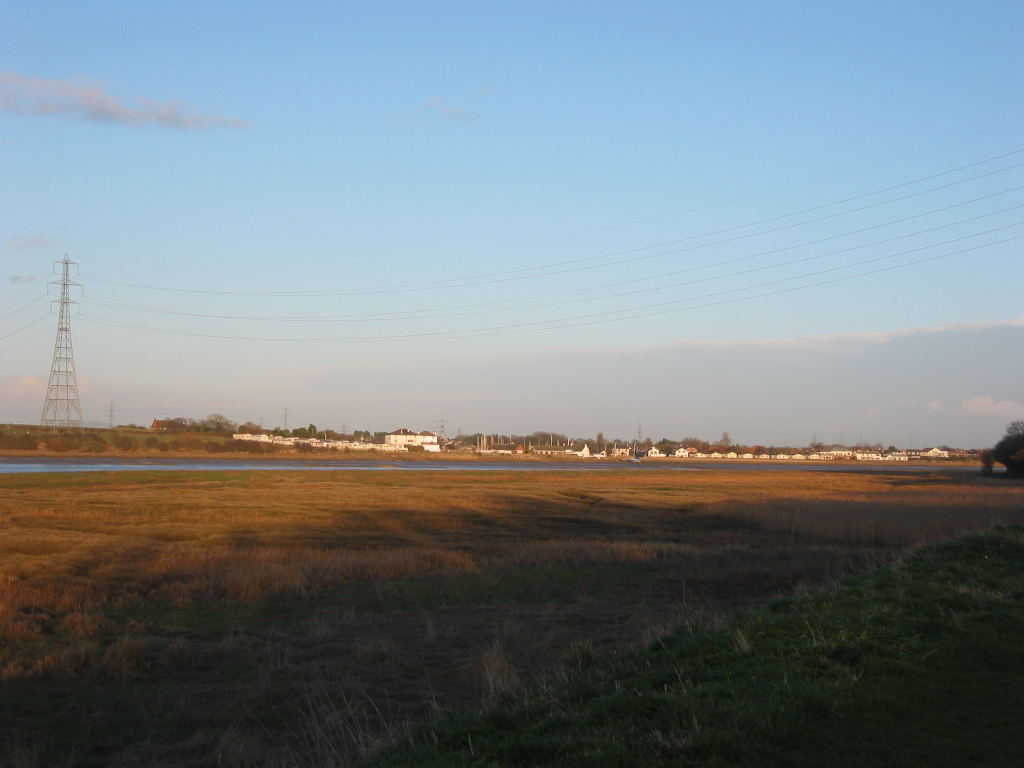
And southwest to the former Wardleys Pub at Wardleys Creek, Hambleton

== Facilities ==
The park's main feature is its network of footpaths that either follow the course of the river to the east, eventually leading to Skippool Creek, or an inland route over grassland. The path following the river is part of the Fleetwood-to-Knott End section of the Wyre Way.

A café is situated just inside the main gates, at the end of River Road, while a boat ramp at the end of the car park on the left.

== Wildlife ==
The park is a popular destination for ornithologists and botanists.

The following birds have been seen in the park's vicinity:

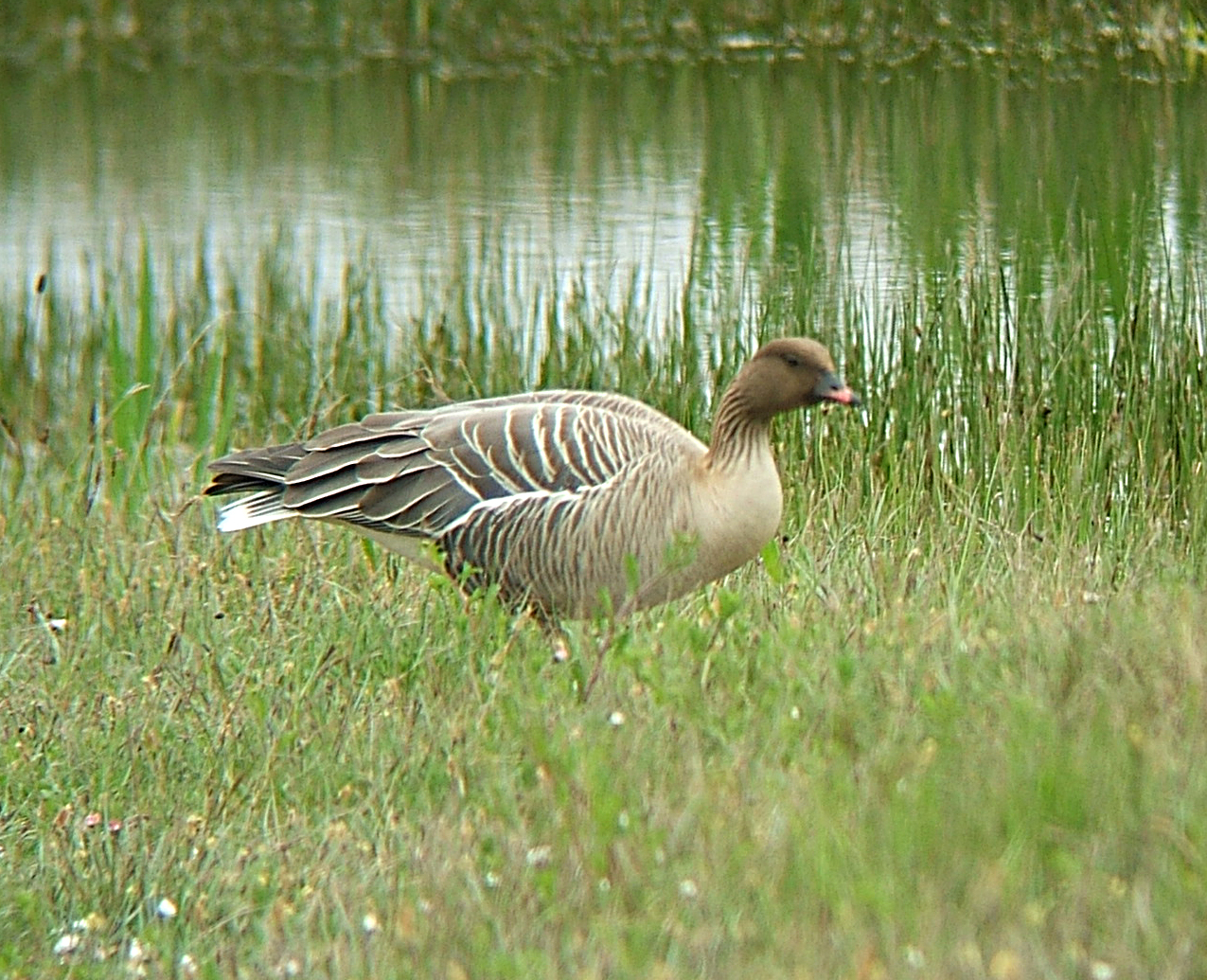
Pink-footed goose

- Black-tailed godwit
- Redshank
- Pink-footed goose
- Reed bunting
- Reed warbler
- Sedge warbler
- Teal

And the below wildflowers have been observed:

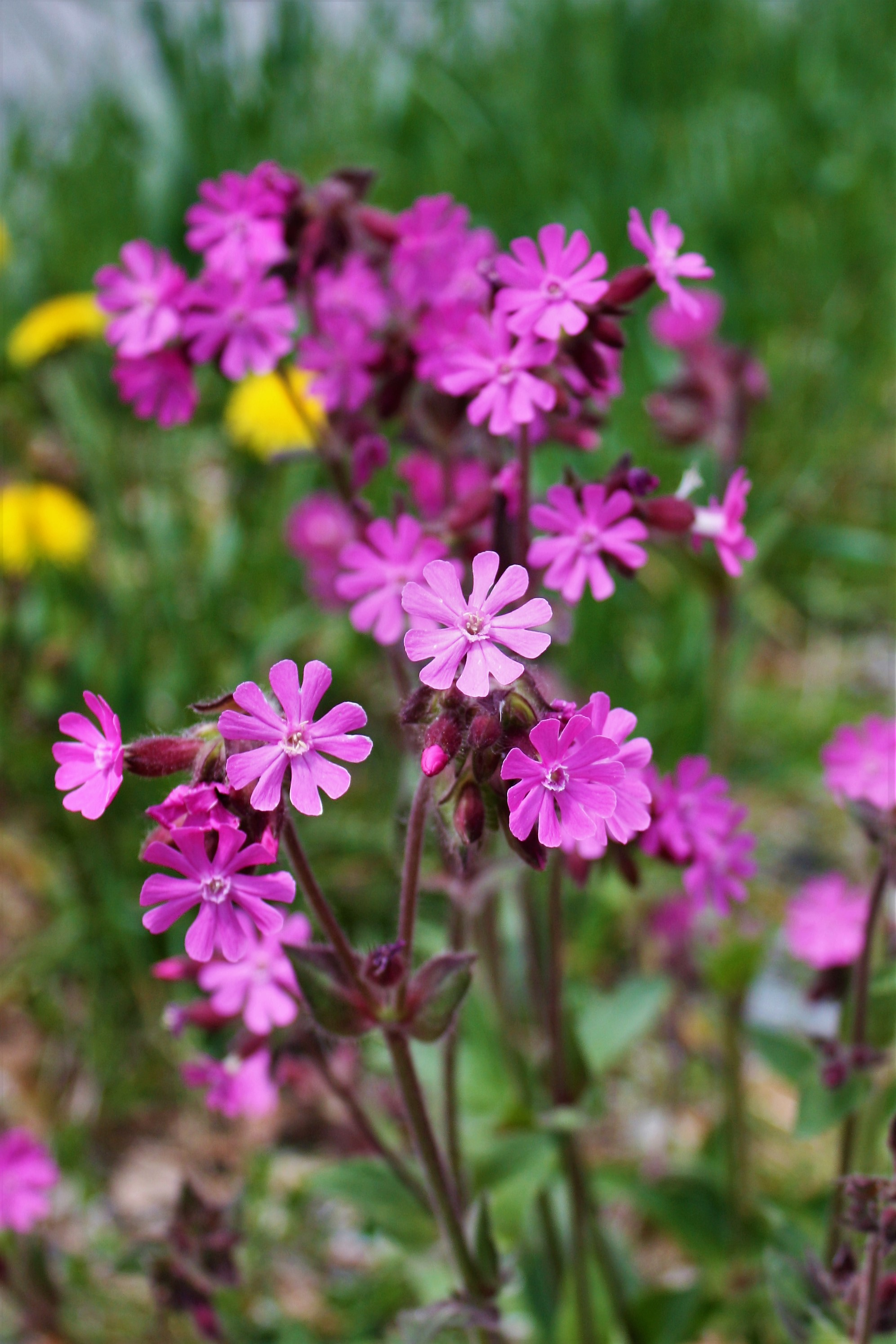
Red campion

- Bee orchid
- Birdsfoot trefoil
- Bluebells
- Comfrey
- Frosted orache
- Glasswort
- Herb Robert
- Northern marsh orchid
- Ramsons
- Red campion
- Scurvy-grass
- Sea arrowgrass
- Sea aster
- Sea lavender
- Sea milkwort
- Sea plantain
- Sea purslane
- Seablite
- Yellow-wort

== Hillylaid Pool ==
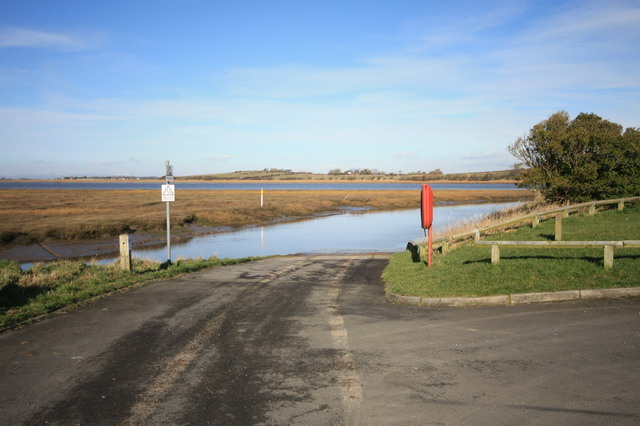
Boats are launched into the final few yards of Hillylaid Pool at the park

Hillylaid Pool empties into the river after its 4.55 miles (7.32 km) journey.
