= Stalmine =

Village in Wyre Borough, Lancashire, England

Coordinates: 53.902°N 2.956°W

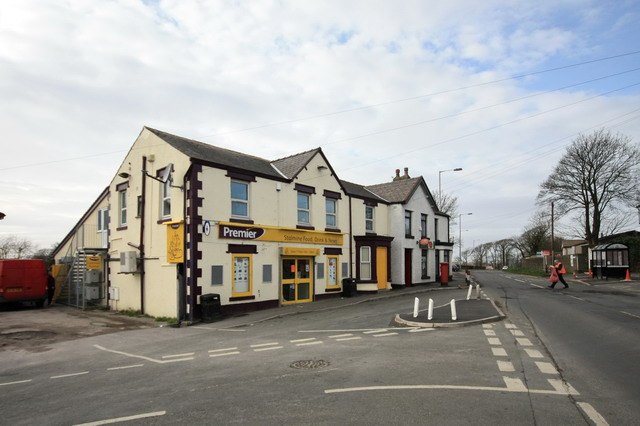
- Shop and Post Office, Stalmine

- Shown within Wyre Borough Shown on the Fylde Location within Lancashire
- Population: 1,087 (2011)
- OS grid reference: SD371456
- Civil parish: Stalmine-with-Staynall
- District: Wyre
- Shire county: Lancashire
- Region: North West
- Country: England
- Sovereign state: United Kingdom
- Post town: POULTON-LE-FYLDE
- Postcode district: FY6
- Dialling code: 01253
- Police: Lancashire
- Fire: Lancashire
- Ambulance: North West
- UK Parliament: Lancaster and Wyre

Stalmine is a village in the civil parish of Stalmine-with-Staynall, in the Wyre borough of Lancashire, England, in a part of the Fylde known as Over Wyre. The village is located on a small hill on the A588, the main road between Hambleton and Lancaster, with the highest level 75 ft above sea level. The village name has been spelled Stalmin (in 1205) and Stalemynne (in 1278). The village had a population of 1,087 at the 2011 Census.

== Village history ==
The name is thought to mean the pool or stream at the mouth of the river, from the Old English steall and the Old Norse mynni.

The village history dates back to 1066 when Tostig Godwinson held it as part of his Preston Fee. The first recorded possessor was Robert de Stalmine in 1165. The chapel of Stalmine was first mentioned about 1200 and a cemetery was consecrated in 1230. The chapel was rebuilt in 1806 when it was renamed St James. In 1689 Stalmine had a Presbyterian meeting house, which in 1717 was stated to be located "very near to the chapel".

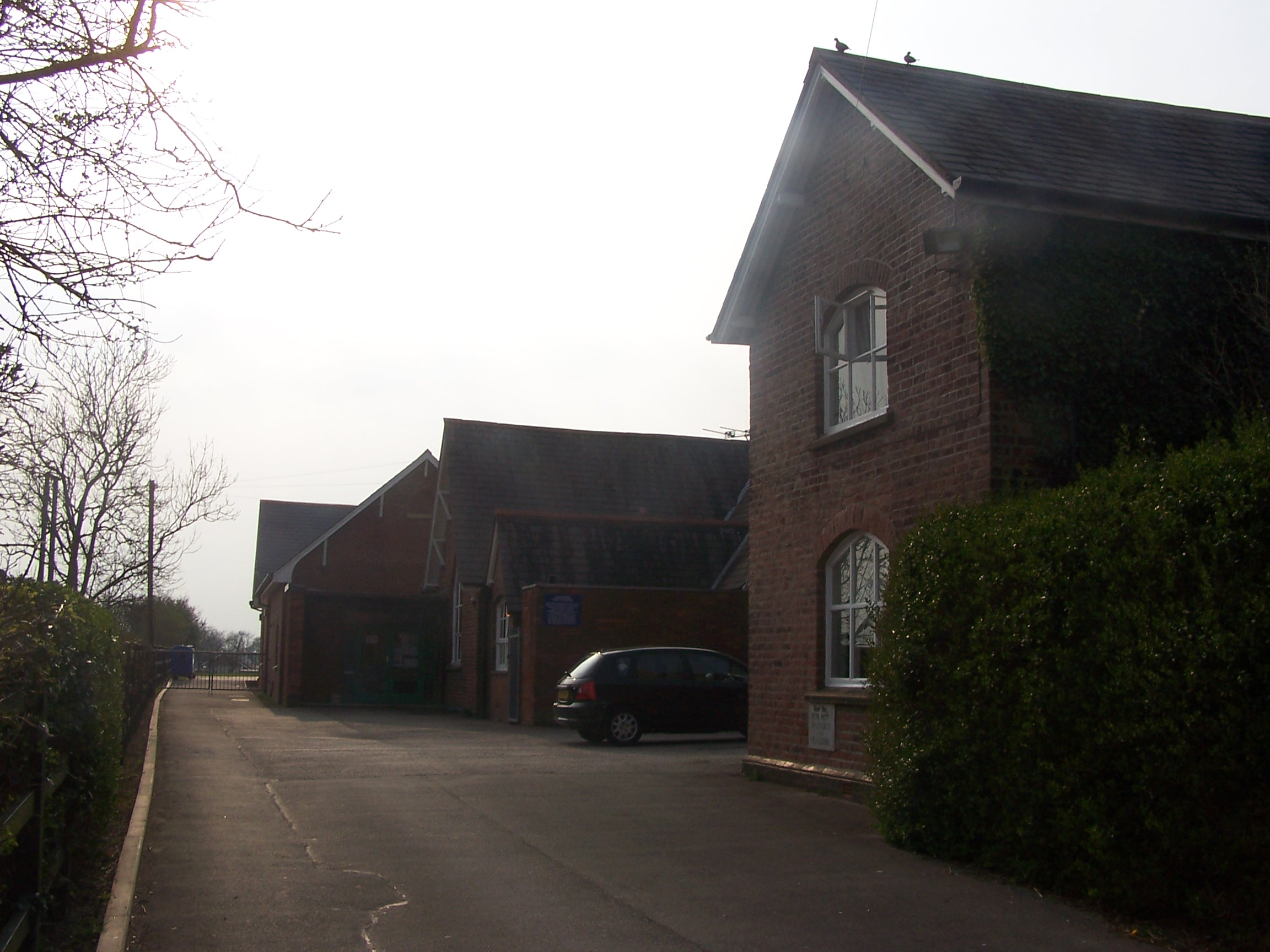
Stalmine County Primary School

== Amenities ==
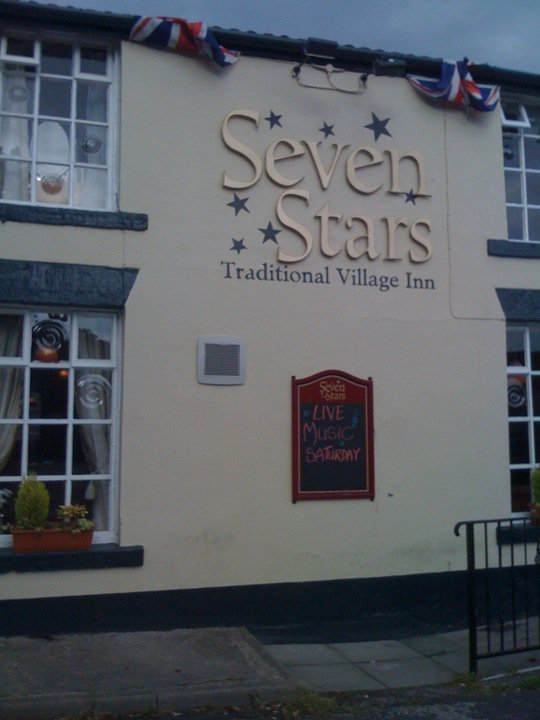
The Seven Stars pub is located on Hall Gate Lane, the main thoroughfare of the village.

The village church, St. James Church (Church of England) on Hallgate Lane, has a sundial dated 1690. The village has one pub (the Seven Stars), which is located at the top of the hill in the village, and one school, Stalmine County Primary School. Stalmine Hall Residential Park is located near the church, in the grounds of the 19th century Stalmine Hall.

== Sport ==
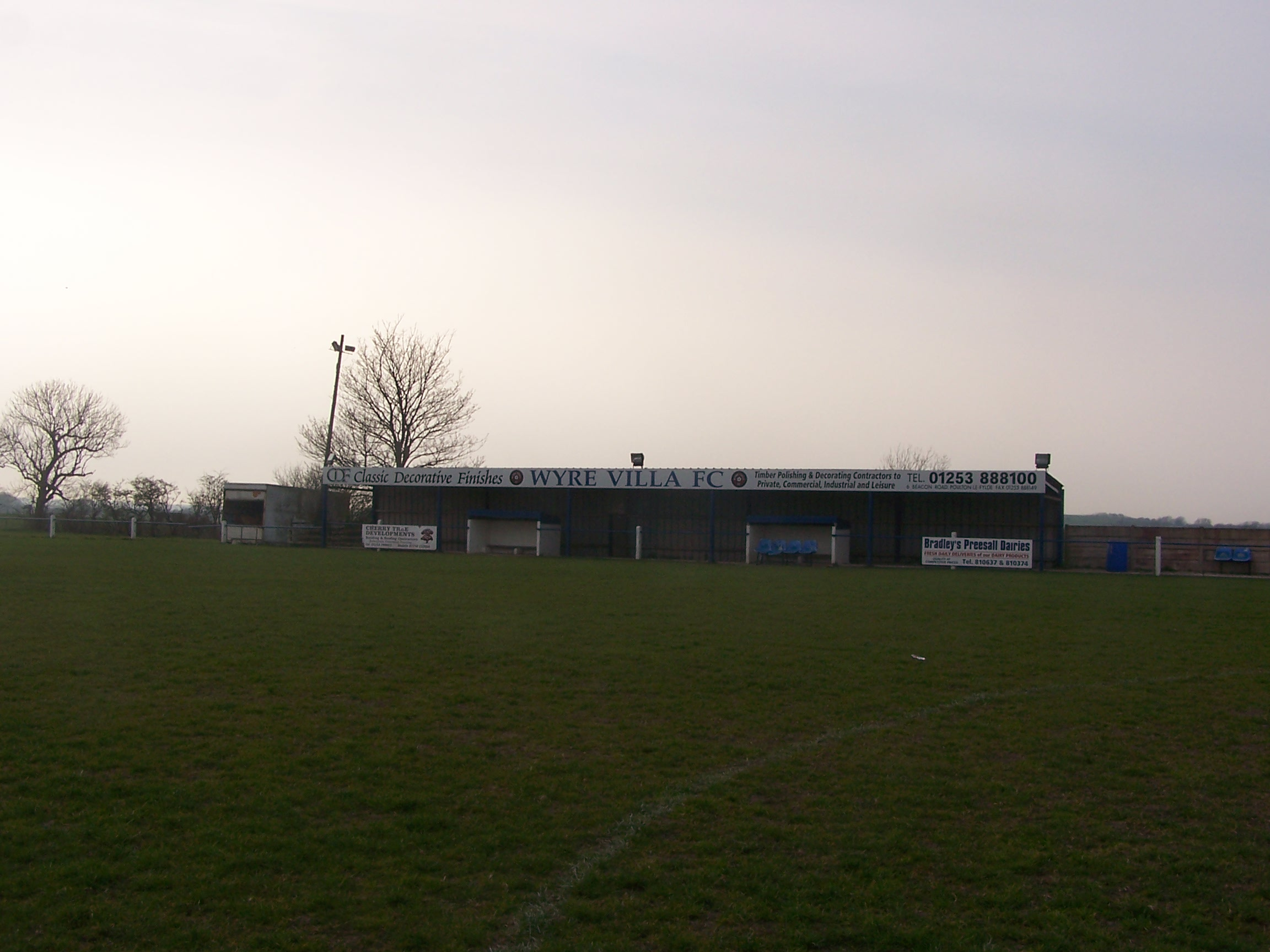
The tiny stand at Hall Gate Park with dugouts.

The village is home to the amateur football club Wyre Villa, who play in the West Lancashire League, part of the English football league system. They play their home games at Hall Gate Park on the edge of the village. The most successful season in the club's history to date was in 1996-97 when they were West Lancashire League champions. Blackpool F.C. Ladies also play their home games at Hall Gate Park.

== See also ==
- Listed buildings in Stalmine-with-Staynall
