= Shard Bridge =

Bridge over River Wyre in Lancashire, England

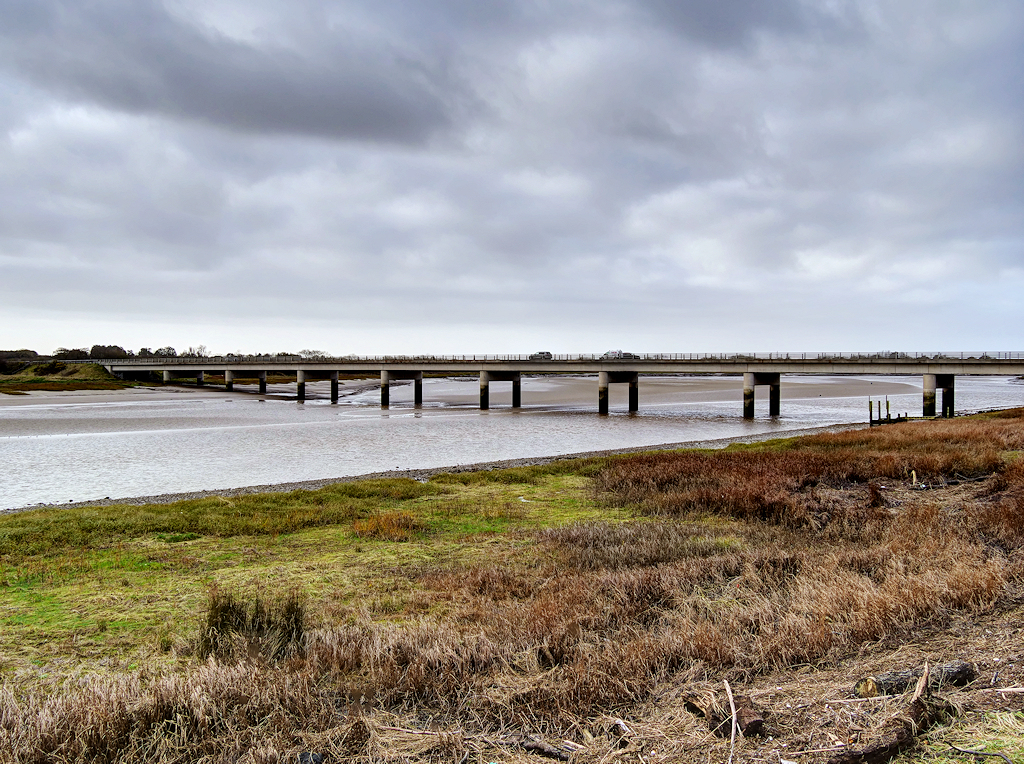
- A 2020 view of the bridge from the northern banks of the River Wyre
- Coordinates: 53.8620°N 2.9625°W
- Carries: A588
- Crosses: River Wyre
- Locale: Singleton — Hambleton, Lancashire, England
- Maintained by: Lancashire County Council

Characteristics
- Design: Segmental
- Longest span: 714 feet (218 m)

History
- Opened: 1993 (33 years ago)

Location
- Interactive map of Shard Bridge

Shard Bridge Act 1975
- Act of Parliament
- Parliament of the United Kingdom
- Long title: An Act to amend and repeal certain provisions of the Shard Bridge Act 1862; to confer new powers on the Shard Bridge Company; and for other purposes.
- Citation: 1975 c. xxxvi

Dates
- Royal assent: 12 November 1975
Other legislation
Amends	Shard Bridge Act 1862

Shard Bridge is a bridge in Lancashire, England. It spans the River Wyre, connecting Singleton, on the southern side of the river (in the Borough of Wyre), to Hambleton on its northern side (in the Borough of Fylde), carrying both automotive and pedestrian traffic of the A588 Shard Road. The word shard is a Roman term for "low crossing point on a river".

The original bridge was authorised by the Shard Bridge Act 1862, and built in 1864, and it went on to replace a ferry service between Cockle Hall and Wardleys Creek further downstream to the west.

The bridge was moved a few yards downstream in 1993, when the third iteration was constructed.

Formerly a toll bridge, it is now a free municipal crossing.

== See also ==
- Shard Riverside Inn
