= A588 road =

Road in England

A588

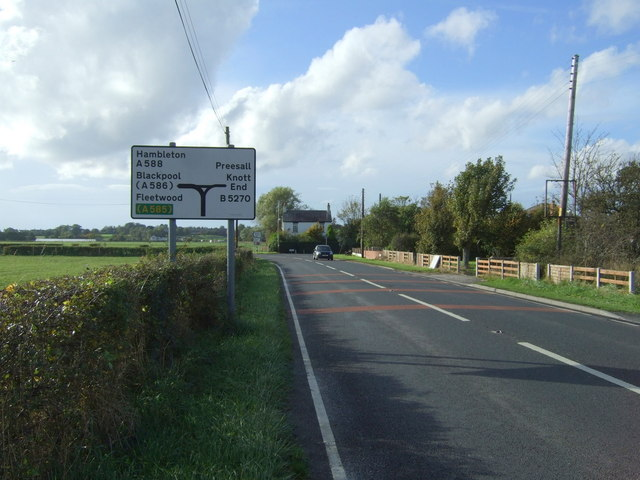
- The A588 (as Head Dyke Lane in this section) in Preesall

Route information
- Length: 20 mi (32 km)

Major junctions
- SW end: A586 – Poulton-le-Fylde

- A585 – Skippool, Little Singleton
- NE end: A6 – Lancaster

Location
- Country: United Kingdom
- Constituent country: England

Road network
- Roads in the United Kingdom; Motorways; A and B road zones

The A588 is a road in western Lancashire, England, which runs for around 20 miles (32 km), from Poulton-le-Fylde northeastwards to Lancaster. It is the main route serving the Over Wyre areas of the Fylde.

== Route ==
The road begins at a junction with the A586 Garstang Road in Poulton-le-Fylde (53.8436°N 2.9922°W), and runs 1 mile (2 km) north, through Queen's Square, as Hardhorn Road, before becoming Breck Road. It meets the A585 eastbound at the River Wyre roundabout. After running concurrently with the A585 as Mains Lane for 0.5 miles (0.8 km), it turns north (left) away from the A585, crossing the River Wyre at Shard Bridge, the last crossing of the river before its estuary. From here, the road winds through the Over Wyre villages of Hambleton (as Shard Lane and Carr Lane) and Stalmine (as Stricklands Lane and Hall Gate Lane). At its junction with the B5377 in Preesall, the road turns northeast as Burned House Lane and Head Dyke Lane through Pilling, then (as Lancaster Road and, briefly, Marsh Lane) across the marshy land that abuts the Cockerham Sands portion of Morecambe Bay. At Cockerham, almost 12 miles (19 km) from Shard Bridge, the road turns to the west and runs a further 6 miles (10 km) north into Lancaster, eventually terminating (as Ashton Road) as it joins the A6 by the Royal Lancaster Infirmary (54.0416°N 2.7969°W).

The section passing beside Cockerham Sands, named one of England's most dangerous roads, is to have average-speed cameras installed along it.

== Public transportation ==
The A588 is served, between Poulton-le-Fylde and Preesall, by Blackpool Transport's routes 5, 5C, 74 and 75, Preston Bus's route 76 and Transpora North West's route 24. For the rural route between Pilling and Lancaster, Kirby Lonsdale Coach Hire runs routes 88 and 89.

From Jamea Al Kauthar northwards, Lancaster's Stagecoach North West routes 40 and 42 are available.

== See also ==
- Conder Bridge
