= Wardleys Creek =

Coordinates: 53.87687°N 2.96790°W

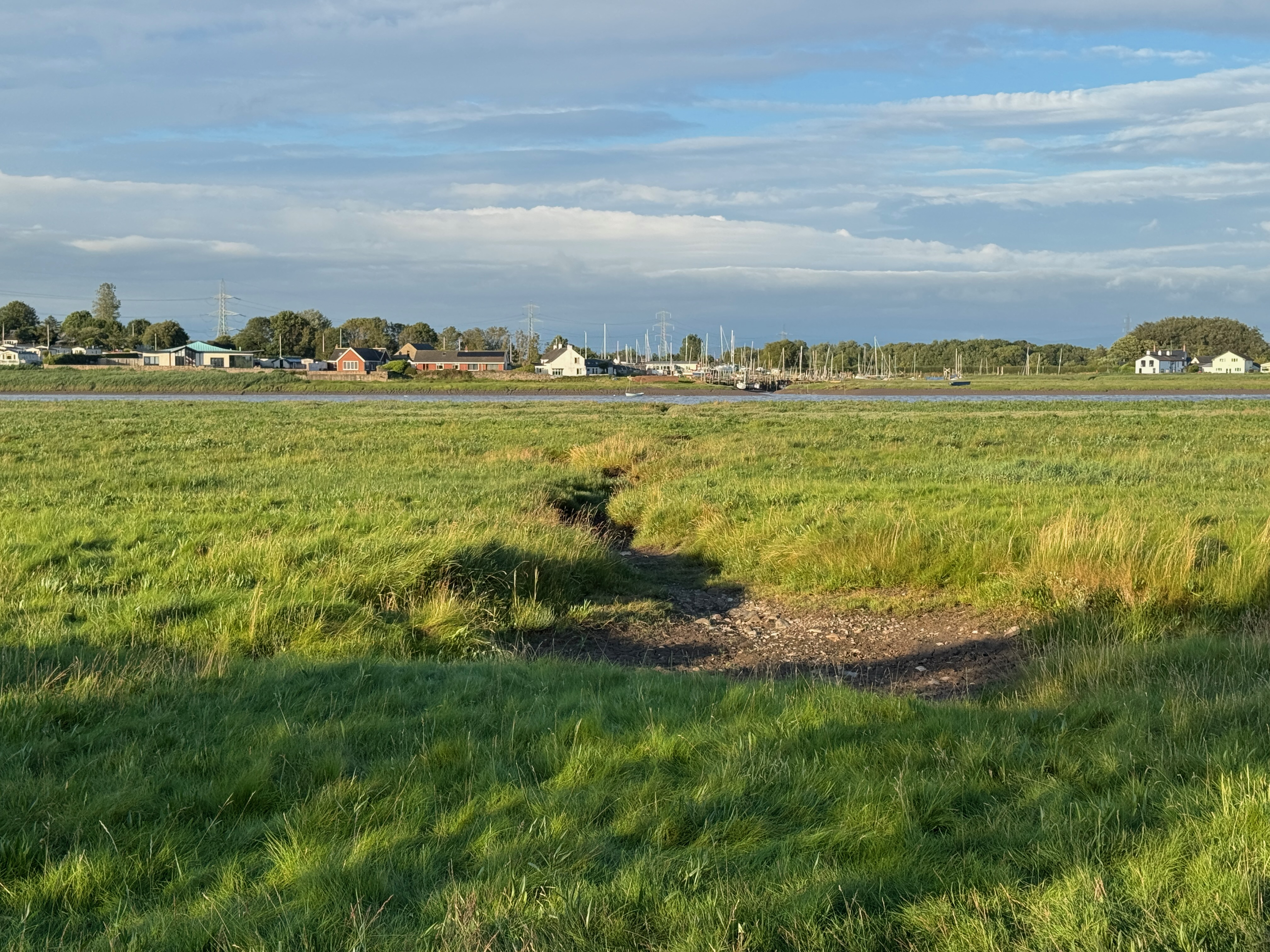
- Wardleys Creek, viewed from the western banks of the River Wyre (2024)

- Location within Wyre Borough Location on the Fylde Location within Lancashire
- District: Wyre
- Shire county: Lancashire
- Region: North West
- Country: England
- Sovereign state: United Kingdom
- Post town: Stalmine-with-Staynall
- Postcode district: FY6
- Dialling code: 01253
- Police: Lancashire
- Fire: Lancashire
- Ambulance: North West

Wardleys Creek is an area of Stalmine-with-Staynall, near the village of Hambleton, Lancashire, England. It is located on the eastern banks of the River Wyre, around 4 miles (6.4 km) from the river's mouth at the Irish Sea.

An ancient port, the creek is believed to have been used since Roman times. In the 16th and 17th centuries, Russian ships sailed along the Wyre estuary to Wardleys Creek and nearby Skippool Creek. In 1708, customs were established in Poulton-le-Fylde to take advantage of the trade, while warehouses, to store wool, linen, yarn, flax and guano, had been built on Wardleys Creek by the early 1740s. A three-masted vessel was built at the harbour.

Prior to nearby Fleetwood's emergence as a harbour, people emigrated to the Americas from the creek, including aboard the Quebec-bound Six Sisters on 3 April 1833. The harbour's foundation rocks are still visible beneath today's wooden jetty.

Until the 1930s, a ferry used to run from Cockle Hall, on the western side of the river, to Wardleys Creek. Some of the passengers were employees of United Alkali Company at Burn Naze, the predecessor to ICI Hillhouse. Parts of the pier are still visible in the marsh in front of where Cockle Hall once stood.

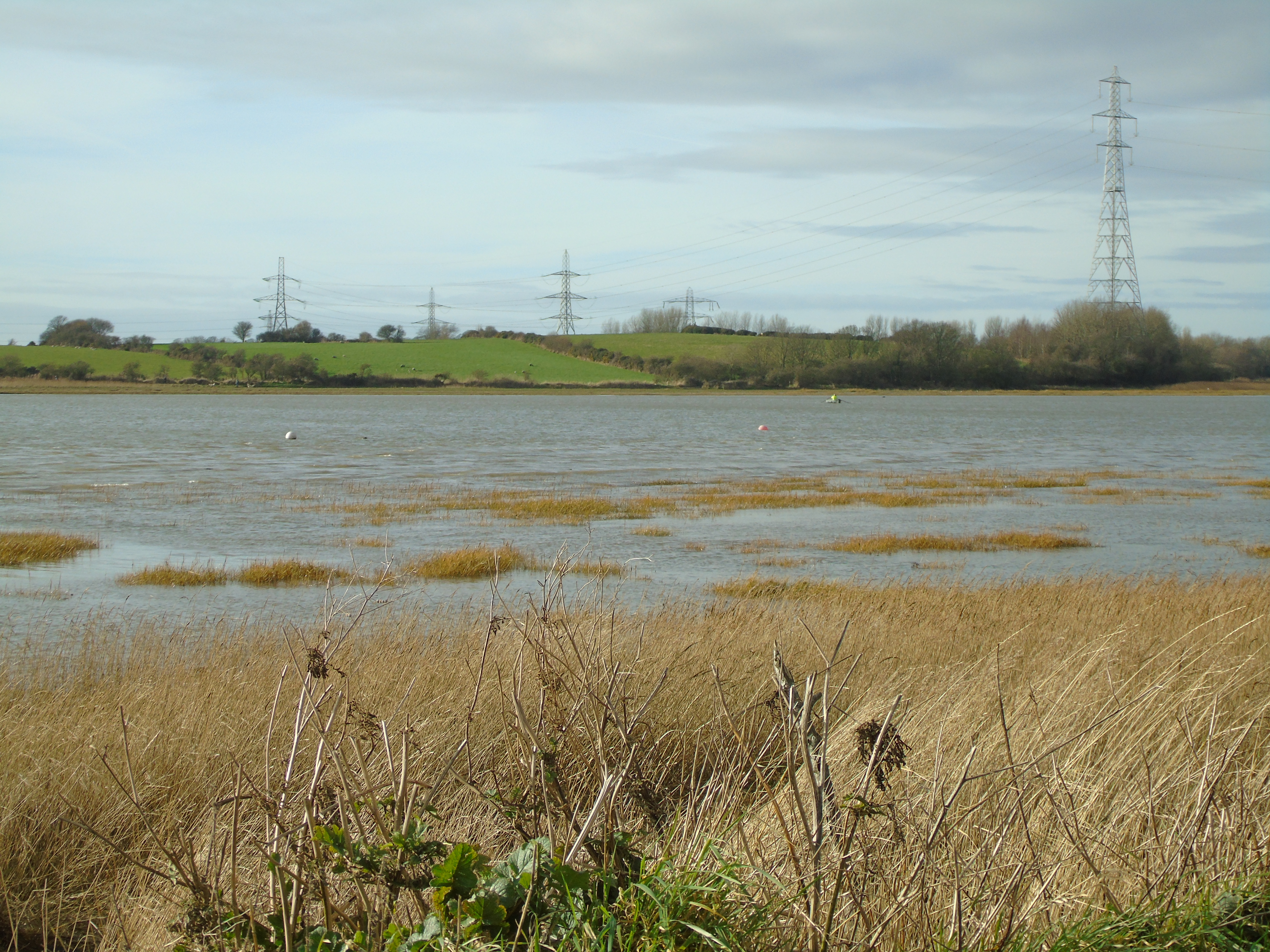
View west over the Wyre from Wardleys Creek to Stanah

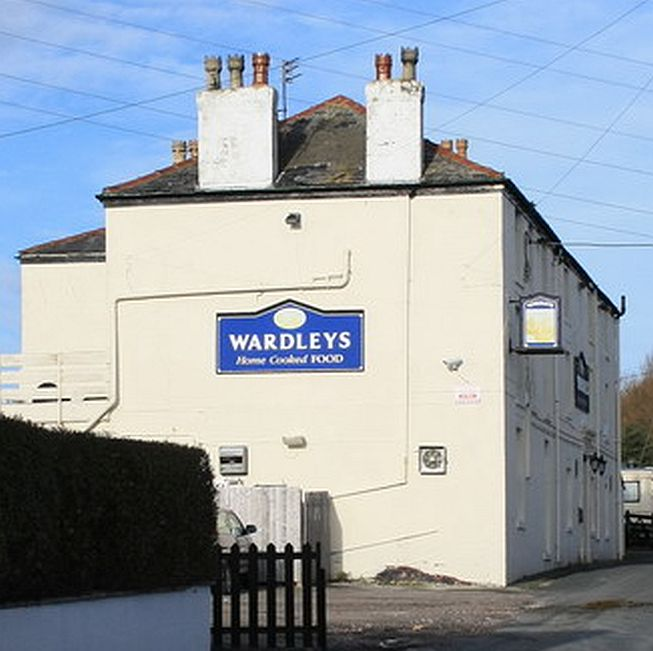
Wardleys Pub stood beside Wardleys Creek from the 18th century to 2011
