= Town End Farmhouse =

- Location within the Borough of Wyre Location within Lancashire
- 53.89876°N 2.95872°W
- Location: Stalmine-with-Staynall, Lancashire, England

History
- Built: 1694 (332 years ago)

Site notes
- Area: Borough of Wyre

Listed Building – Grade II
- Designated: 3 October 1984
- Reference no.: 1073085

Town End Farmhouse is a historic building in Stalmine-with-Staynall, Lancashire, England. It was built in 1694 and is in brick with a thatched roof covered in corrugated asbestos. It has one-and-a-half storeys and two bays. The windows have plain reveals; some of them are sashes, others are modern. Above the doorway is an inscribed plaque, and inside the house is an encased bressumer.

== See also ==
- Listed buildings in Stalmine-with-Staynall
