= Cartford Bridge =

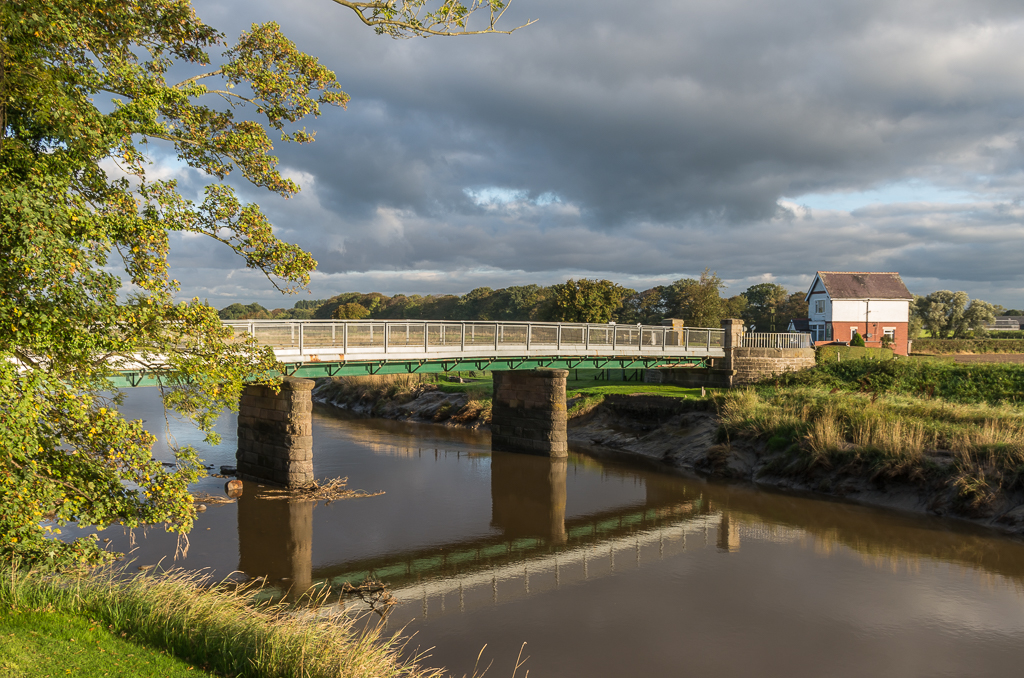
- The bridge pictured in 2018, looking northwest
- Coordinates: 53.8609°N 2.8804°W
- Carries: Cartford Lane
- Crosses: River Wyre
- Locale: Little Eccleston-with-Larbreck and Out Rawcliffe, Lancashire, England
- Maintained by: The Cartford Bridge Company Ltd.

Characteristics
- Total length: 450 feet (137 m)

History
- Opened: 1831 (195 years ago)

Statistics
- Toll: £0.20 Bicycles and Motorcycles; £0.60 Cars and Vans; £0.90 Vehicles up to 5t; £1.20 Vehicles up to 7.5t

Location
- Interactive map of Cartford Bridge

Cartford Bridge is a single-track toll bridge in the English county of Lancashire. Built in 1831, it spans the River Wyre, connecting Little Eccleston-with-Larbreck, in the Borough of Fylde, on the southern side of the river, to Out Rawcliffe, in the Borough of Wyre, on its northern side (known locally as "Over Wyre"), carrying both automotive and pedestrian traffic of Cartford Lane. The tolls are £1.20 for vehicles exceeding five tonnes, 90p for vehicles exceeding two tonnes, 60p for motorised vehicles not exceeding two tonnes, and 20p for two-wheeled vehicles. (The toll was one shilling for cars, with no charge for motorcycles, in 1908, when the bridge was described as being "very awkward for motor cars, as there are iron channels for the cart wheels, and they are the wrong width for cars".) In 1966, it was one of twelve toll bridges on roads in England of level Class III (now Class "C") or higher. It is 450 feet (137 m) in length.

The bridge, which is located nine miles from the mouth of the River Wyre at Fleetwood, was built by the squire of Rawcliffe Hall in 1831 after both his gamekeeper and his dairyman drowned crossing the ford it replaced.

The entire Rawcliffe Hall estate was auctioned off in 1926, to pay the death duties, and the Cartford Bridge Company was formed in 1929.

The Speight and Thickins families have managed the bridge since 1929. The last toll keepers they employed were there for over thirty years, until they retired in 2021, and new toll keepers appointed.

The Cartford Inn, which dates from at least the 19th century, stands on the southern side of the bridge.

== Gallery ==
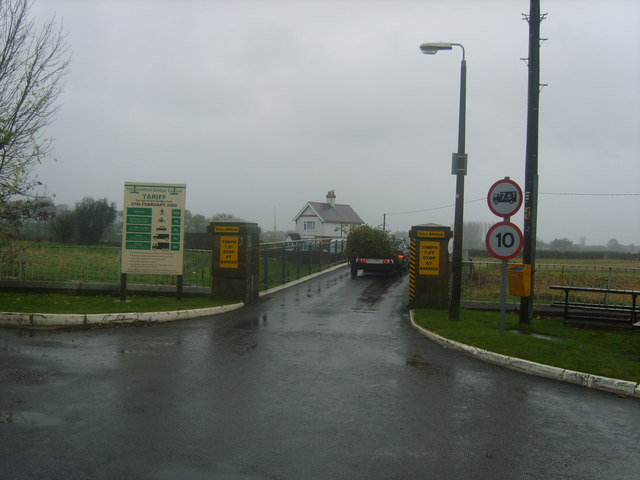
The southern side of the bridge in 2009

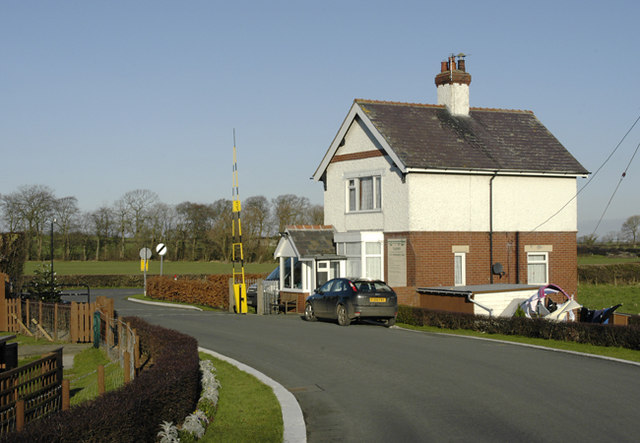
The toll house, on the northern side of the bridge, in 2008
