= Shard Riverside Inn =

Pub in Lancashire, England

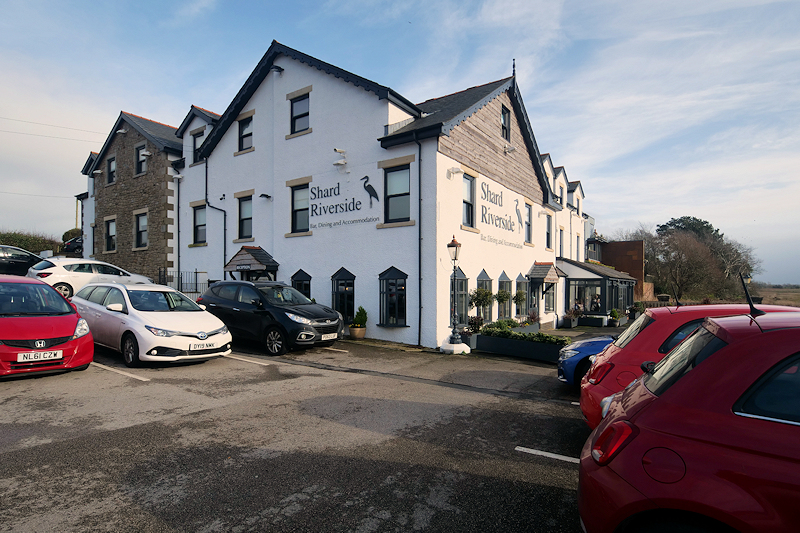
- The building in 2020
- Former names: Shard House; Shard Bridge Inn; The Shard Inn
- Alternative names: The Shard

General information
- Type: Public house
- Location: Old Bridge Lane, Hambleton, Lancashire, England
- Coordinates: 53.86299580°N 2.958874055°W
- Completed: 1766 (260 years ago)

Other information
- Number of rooms: 23
- Parking: on-site

Website
- www.shardriversideinn.co.uk

Shard Riverside Inn is a public house and boutique hotel in the English village of Hambleton, Lancashire. Dating to 1766, it stands on the northern banks of the River Wyre, about 600 feet (180 m) east of Shard Bridge, after which it is named. The bridge used to be immediately to the west of the building, but a new structure (the third overall) was built in 1993, a few yards downstream, and its predecessor demolished. The building's address, Old Bridge Lane, references this.

== History ==
In the early 19th century, the building was a ferryman's cottage known as Shard House. The slipway for the ferry still exists in front of the property.

Around fifty years later, in Victorian times, Anna Sewell, author of Black Beauty, often visited her relatives who lived at the property.

The property was put up for sale in April 2021, with an asking price of £2.6 million. Its owners had run the business since 2004.

== Gravestone ==
In front of the property, on the leeward side of the sea wall, is the gravestone of Norman Henshaw, then resident of the property, who drowned in the river on 14 August 1908, aged 25, after rescuing his dog, Jack. The dog survived, and lived another six years. Henshaw is not mentioned on the gravestone.

== Gallery ==
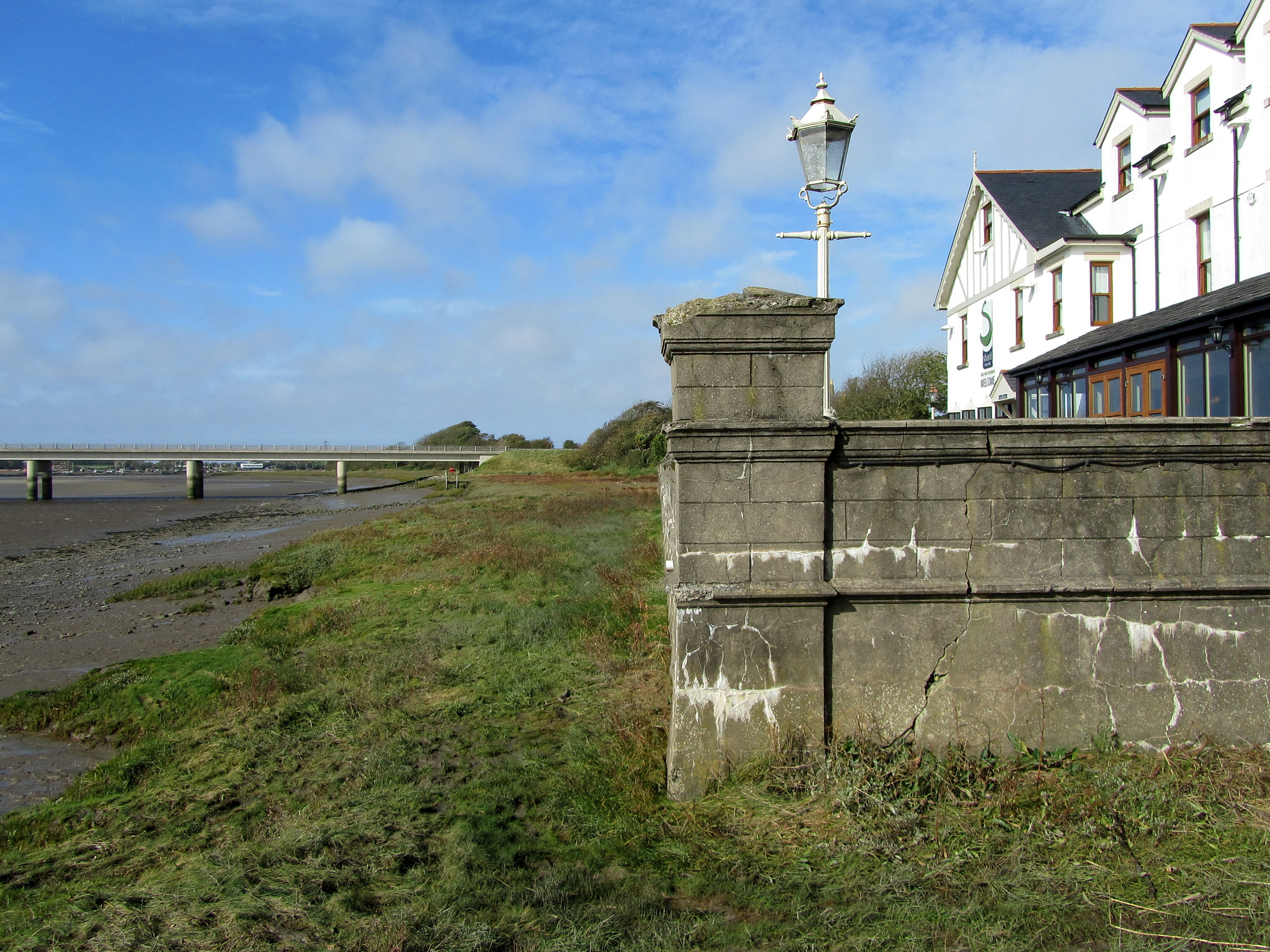
Looking downstream (west) to Shard Bridge, 2011
