= Wardleys, Hambleton =

Pub in Lancashire, England

Wardleys
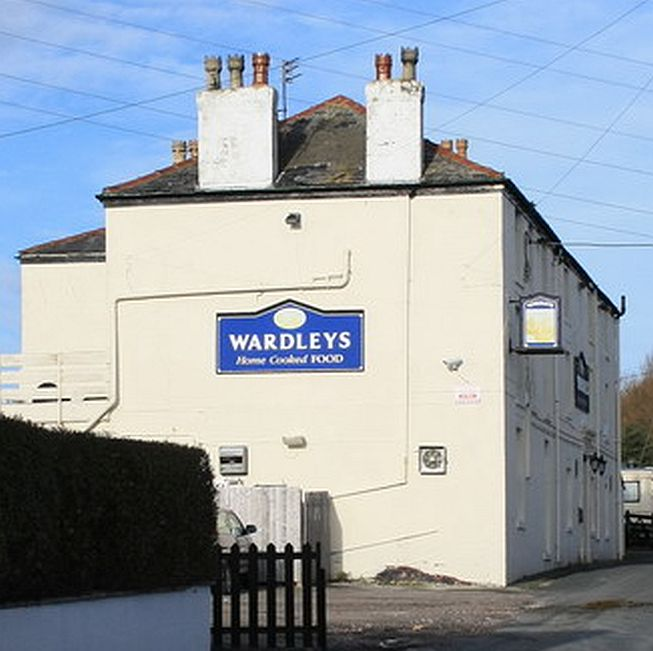
- The pub in 2009, shortly before its demolition
- Interactive map of the Wardleys area
- Former names: Wardleys Hotel
- Alternative names: Wardleys Riverside Inn

General information
- Type: Public house
- Location: Wardley's Lane, Hambleton, Lancashire, England
- Coordinates: 53.8787°N 2.9669°W
- Completed: 18th century
- Closed: 2005

Technical details
- Floor count: 3

Wardleys was a pub on Wardley's Lane in the civil parish of Stalmine-with-Staynall, near the village of Hambleton, Lancashire. The building dated to the 18th century and occupied a location, on the eastern banks of the River Wyre and beside Wardleys Creek, believed to have been used since Roman times.

In the 1890s, during part of its life as a hotel, it was owned by Thomas Houghton. In the 1950s, R. F. Fyles was the proprietor. It was also a farm during that era, and a fire destroyed its barn in December 1899; the hotel was not affected.

After the pub's closure in 2005, the building fell into disuse and dereliction, during which time it was used as a marijuana-growing location on its upper floors and a Chinese restaurant on the ground floor. It closed in late 2010 and burned down on 25 April 2011. It was then demolished, and has now been replaced by a home, built by the last owner of the pub.

== Gallery ==
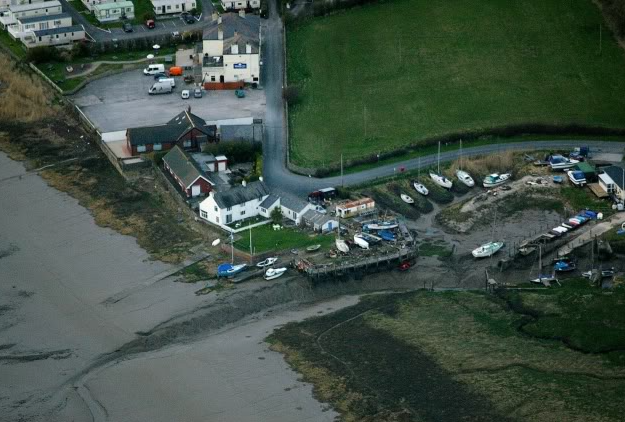
An aerial view of Wardleys Creek, with the pub at the top of the picture

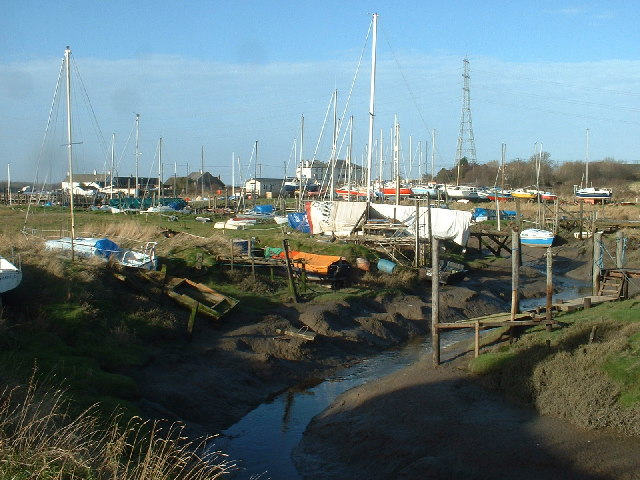
A view of the pub from Wardleys Creek, looking northwest

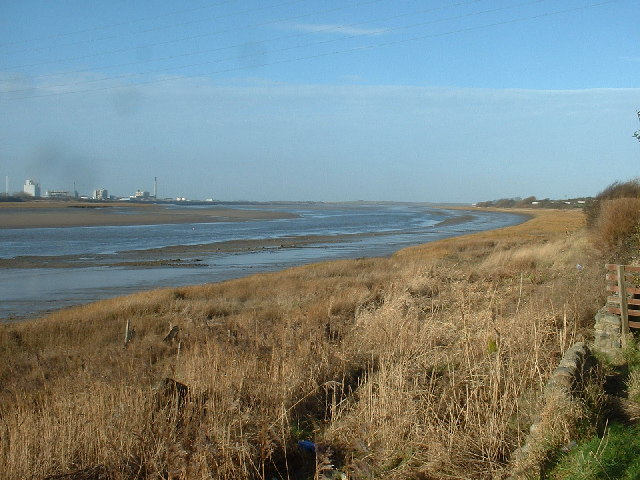
Looking northwest from the pub car park across the River Wyre to the ICI works at Thornton and Fleetwood

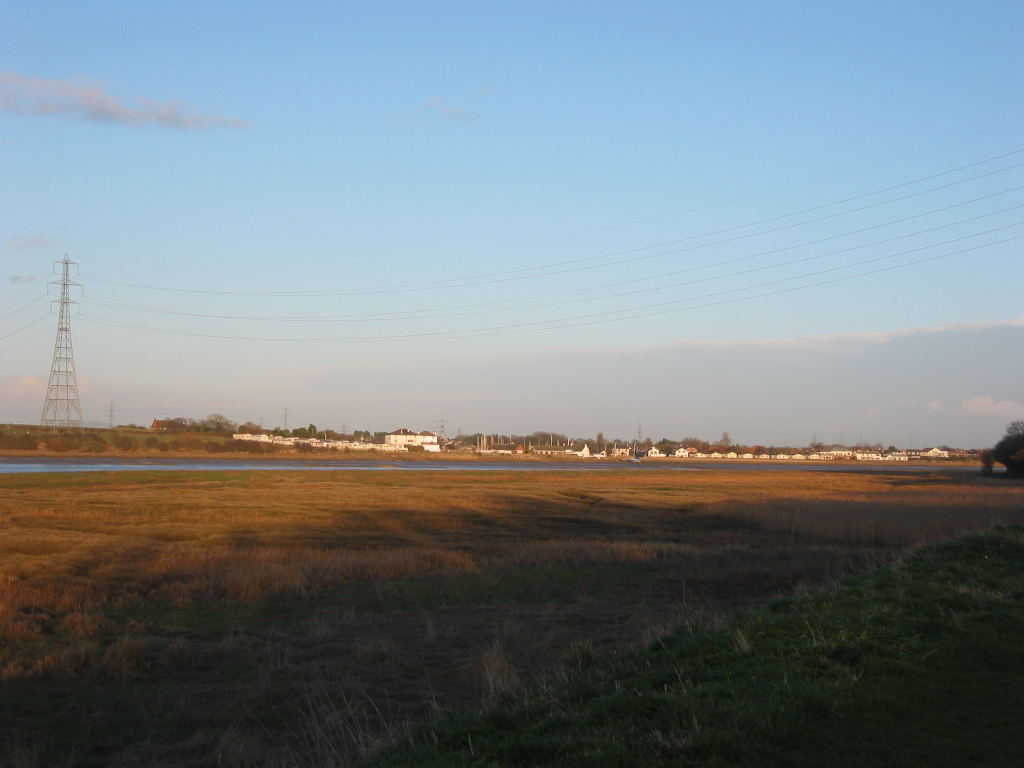
Wardleys Pub viewed from Wyre Estuary Country Park in Stanah, 2007. Looking southeast
