= The Cartford =

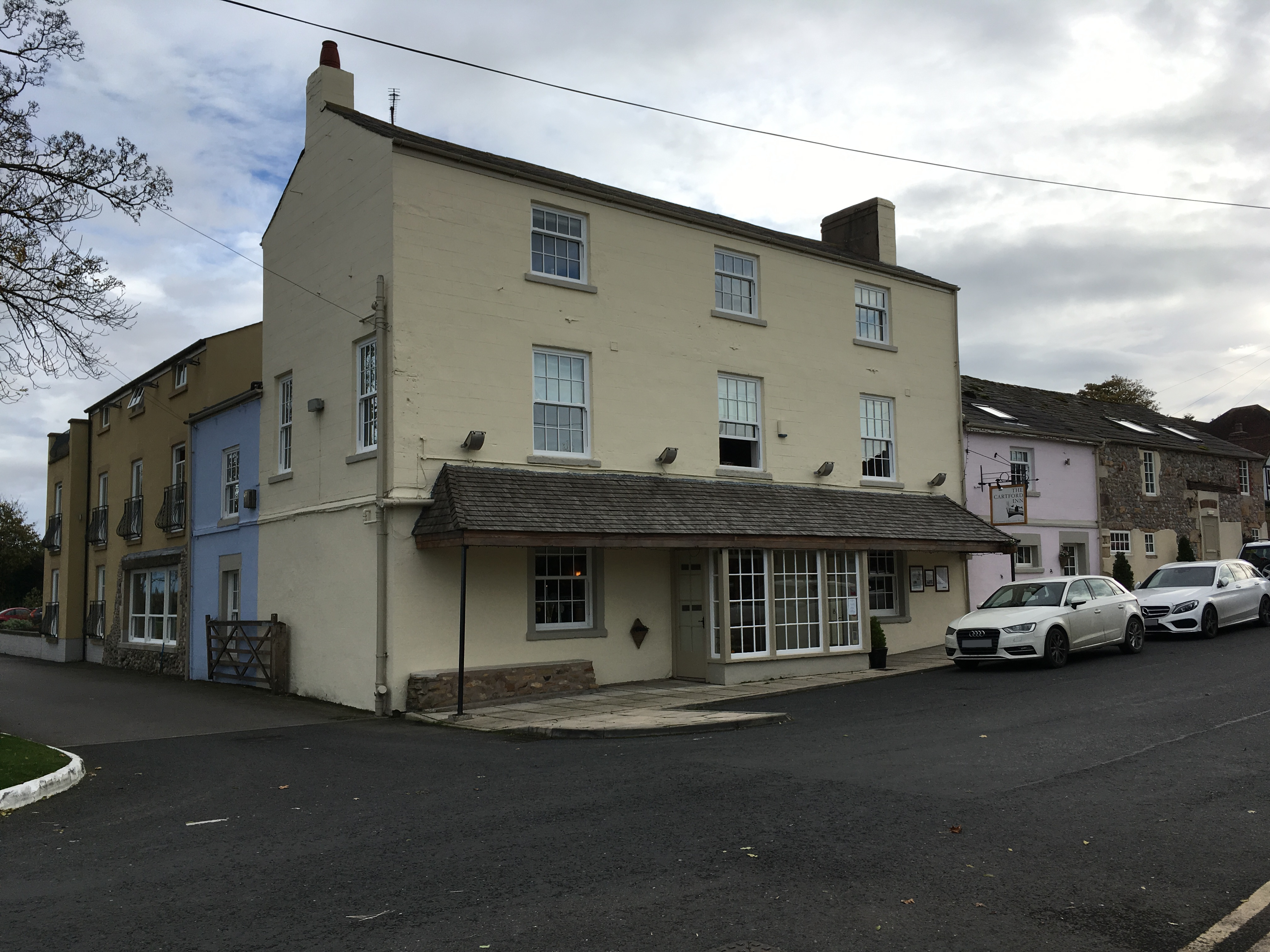
- The main inn building in 2016

- Location within Lancashire
- Interactive map of the The Cartford area
- Former names: Cartford Hotel; Cartford Arms; Cartford Inn
- Alternative names: Th'fooard

General information
- Type: Public house
- Location: Cartford Lane, Little Eccleston-with-Larbreck, Lancashire, England
- Coordinates: 53.860531°N 2.880667°W
- Elevation: 32.8 feet (10.0 m)
- Owner: 2007–present: Julie and Patrick Beaumé

Technical details
- Floor count: 3 (main inn building)

Other information
- Number of rooms: 15 (including two cabins)

Website
- www.thecartfordinn.co.uk

The Cartford (formerly Cartford Hotel and Cartford Arms and Cartford Inn) is a boutique hotel and restaurant with rooms in Little Eccleston-with-Larbreck, Lancashire, England. The property comprises a restaurant holding 2 AA Rosettes and a listing in the Michelin Guide, thirteen individually designed bedrooms, an on-site deli, and an art gallery. It stands on the southern banks of the River Wyre, just off the Cartford Bridge, one of the few remaining toll bridges in the United Kingdom, with views to the northeast of the Forest of Bowland.

The Beaumé family have owned the property since 2007, after they purchased it from John Smith. Julie Beaumé was born in nearby Blackpool, while Patrick Beaumé was born in the Médoc, Bordeaux.

== History ==
A former coaching inn, the first record of "The Cartford Inn" name was in 1839. It had become the Cartford Hotel by 1853. A landlady in the 1960s was known as "Dirty Annie".

The establishment changed name in the 1980s to the Cartford Arms.

== Recognition ==
In 2024, when operating as an inn, it was named AA Inn of the Year for Great Britain. When operating as an inn, it was also included in the Top 50 Gastropubs list and in the Condé Nast Johansens guide. Its restaurant is listed in the Michelin Guide.

The Cartford has been awarded an AA five-star rating. Before the AA became the licence holder of the quality assessment schemes, it also received five stars from VisitEngland.

The Daily Telegraph described it as a "quirky yet stylish boutique hotel with a modern British-French restaurant".

The Times described it as "a great foodie find in Lancashire".

It was named the UK's 2020 Pub of the Year by The Daily Telegraph.

== Food and drink ==
The restaurant's menus are built around seasonal Lancashire produce, with a noted French influence. The food is the work of head chef Chris Bury (formerly of The Fat Duck), who took over the head-chef position from Ian Manning in 2016.

The restaurant was reviewed by The Guardian's Jay Rayner in 2017 and The Caterer's Brendan Coyne in 2015.

Also on the property is the two-storey River House, which was formerly John Smith's Hart Brewery.

== Accommodation ==
There are thirteen individually designed rooms in the main building. There are also two cabins―named Ziggy and the Robins Nest— on the property.

== Gallery ==
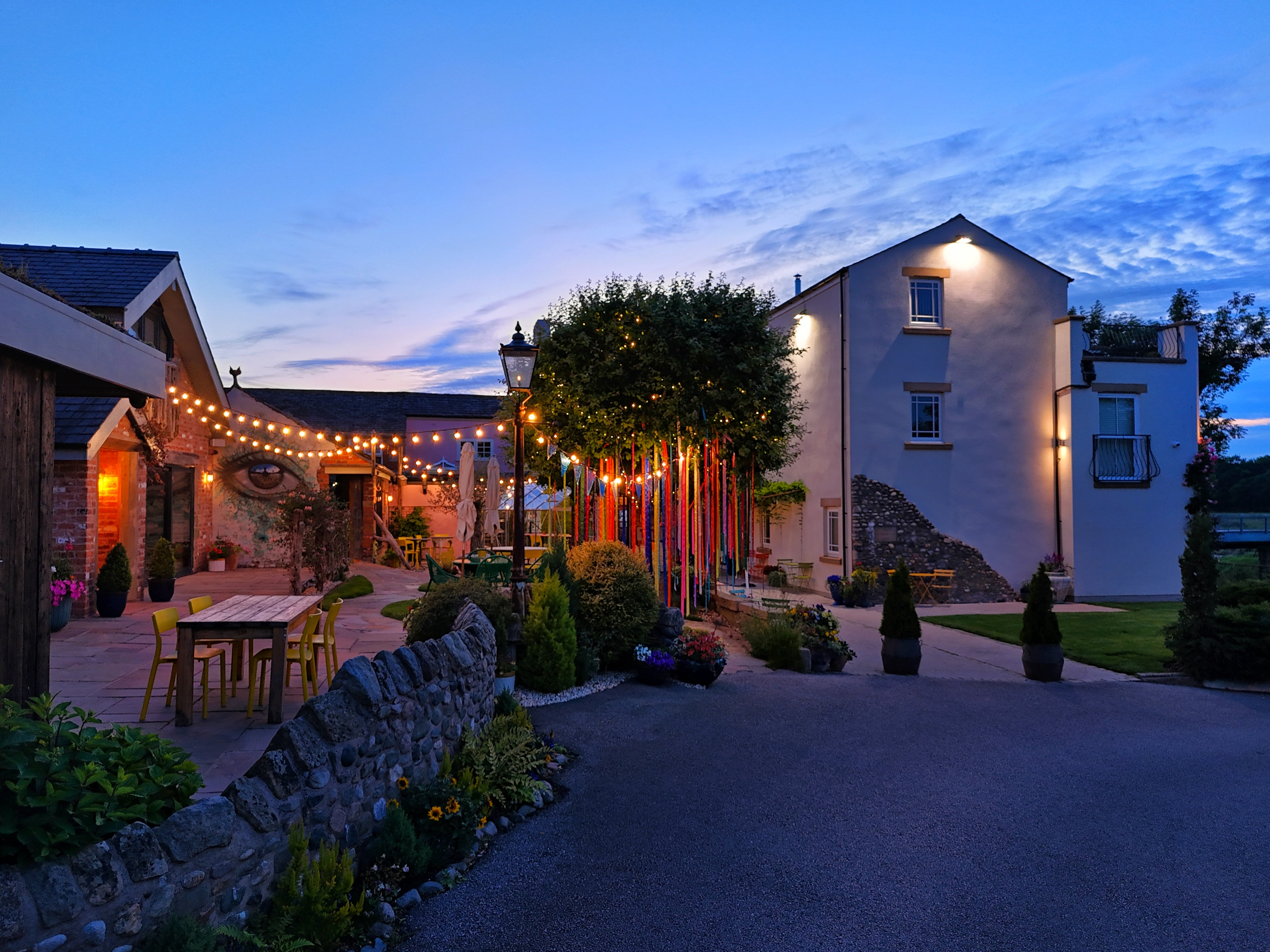
Courtyard

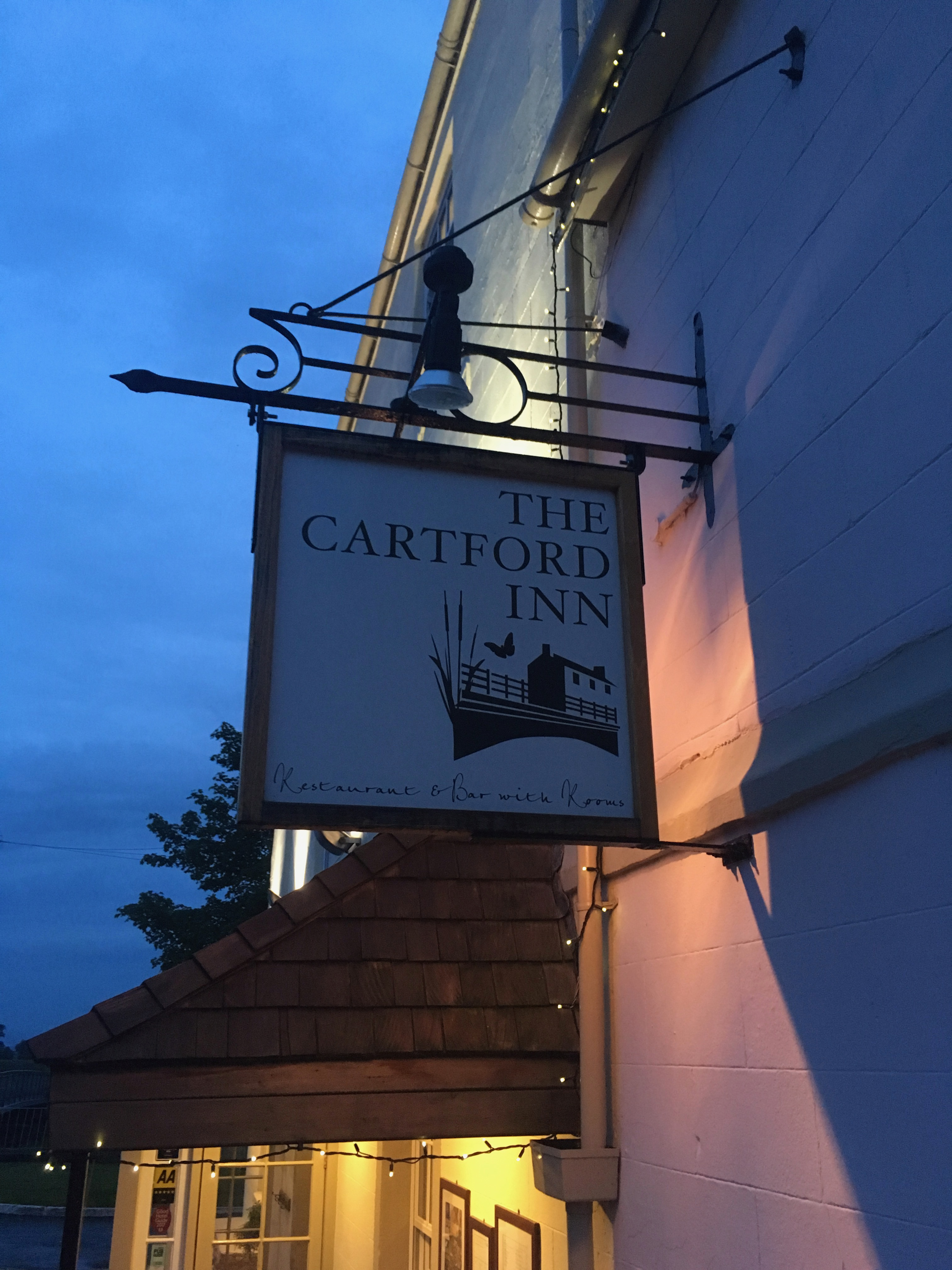
The building's sign in 2017

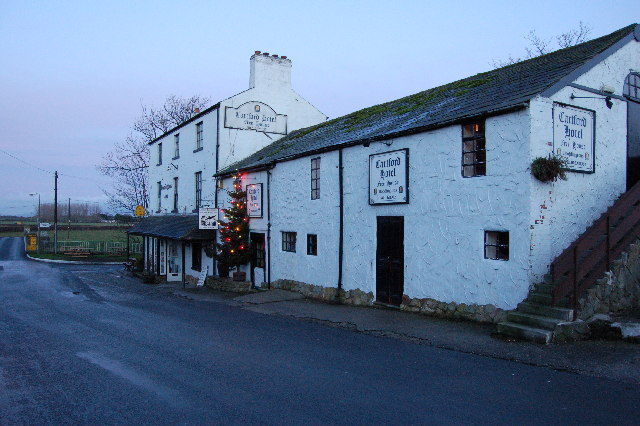
The building in 2005, when it was known as the Cartford Hotel
