= Hambleton Hall =

Hambleton Hall may refer to

- Hambleton Hall, Lancashire
- Hambleton Hall, Rutland
