= Listed buildings in Little Eccleston-with-Larbreck =

Little Eccleston-with-Larbreck is a civil parish in the Borough of Fylde, Lancashire, England. It contains five buildings that are recorded in the National Heritage List for England as designated listed buildings, all of which are listed at Grade II. This grade is the lowest of the three gradings given to listed buildings and is applied to "buildings of national importance and special interest". The parish contains the small settlements of Little Eccleston and Larbreck, and is otherwise rural. The listed buildings consist of farmyards and farm buildings.

== Buildings ==
Name and location	Photograph	Date	Notes
Barn, Little Eccleston Hall; 53.85135°N 2.89131°W	—	17th century (probable)	A cruck-framed barn encased in brick, and with a thatched roof, It has a rectangular three-bay plan. There is a central wagon entrance, flanked by doorways. On the front are ventilation slits, and on the right gable end they are in diamond patterns. Inside are two full cruck trusses.
Little Eccleston Hall; 53.85119°N 2.89300°W		1638	A farmhouse containing earlier fabric, it is built in pebbledashed brick with a roof of slate and stone-slate. The house has two storeys and an H-shaped plan. It originated as a cruck-framed house that was rebuilt in brick in 1638. A cross-wing was built on the left in 1671, and a right cross-wing in 1820. In the centre is a two-storey gabled porch with a round-headed entrance, and a ball finial on the apex. The windows are casements. It is thought that there is a full cruck truss internally.
Wall Farmhouse; 53.85546°N 2.89513°W	—	Late 17th century	A brick farmhouse with some stone dressings and a slate roof, with two storeys, an attic, and cellars. On the front is a full-height gabled porch with an arched doorway, above which is a window with three pointed lights. Elsewhere there are sash windows, some of them being sliding sashes, and blocked mullioned former windows.
Barn, Wall Farm; 53.85579°N 2.89480°W	—	Early 18th century	A brick barn on a cobble base, with some stone quoins, it has a T-shaped plan with three bats and a wide outshut porch on the front containing a wagon entrance. In the outer bays are lofts. On the barn are ventilations holes in diamond and H-shaped patterns.
Farm buildings, Little Eccleston Hall; 53.85166°N 2.89313°W	—	1820	The farm buildings are arranged around a quadrangle, and have been converted for domestic use. They are in brick on a sandstone plinth with sandstone dressings and roofs of slate and corrugated sheet. The entrance is on the south side, and the buildings include barns, a stable, and a cowshed. The buildings contain wagon entrances, doorways, ventilation holes in various patterns, and pitching holes in the shape of lunettes.
