= Stalmine-with-Staynall =

Parish in Wyre Borough, Lancashire, England

Coordinates: 53.899°N 2.959°W

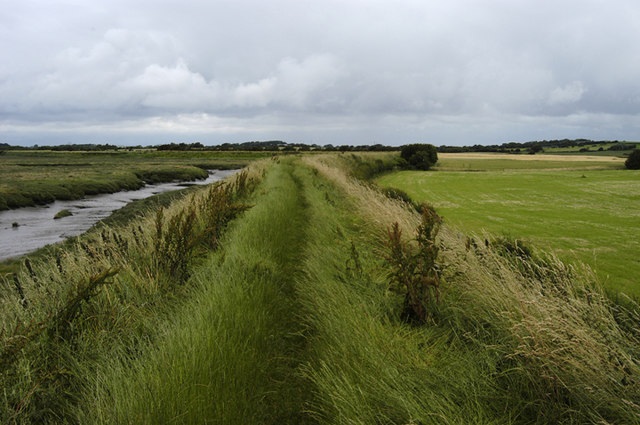
- On the bank of the River Wyre

- Shown within Wyre Borough Shown on the Fylde Location within Lancashire
- Area: 9.8568 km^{2} (3.8057 sq mi)
- Population: 1,486 (2011)
  - Density: 151/km^{2} (390/sq mi)
- OS grid reference: SD371456
- Civil parish: Stalmine-with-Staynall
- District: Wyre
- Shire county: Lancashire
- Region: North West
- Country: England
- Sovereign state: United Kingdom
- Post town: POULTON-LE-FYLDE
- Postcode district: FY6
- Dialling code: 01253
- Police: Lancashire
- Fire: Lancashire
- Ambulance: North West
- UK Parliament: Lancaster and Wyre

Stalmine-with-Staynall is a civil parish within the Wyre borough of Lancashire, England, in a part of the Fylde known as Over Wyre. The parish contains the village of Stalmine and the hamlets of Staynall and Wardleys. The civil parish had a population of 1,486 at the 2011 Census, of which 1,087 lived in Stalmine village.

Located close to the Irish Sea coast, the Wyre Estuary forms the parish's western boundary. The highest point is only approximately 75 feet (23 m) above sea level. The parish adjoins the Wyre parishes of Fleetwood, Preesall, Pilling, Out Rawcliffe, Hambleton and the Thornton area which is unparished.

== History ==
Stalmine is thought to mean the pool or stream at the mouth of the river, from the Old English steall and the Old Norse mynni. Staynall is less certain. The second element likely means hollow from the Old English holh, with the first element either ON steinn / OE stan meaning stone or perhaps a similar personal name.

Stalmine appears in the Domesday Book as belonging to Tostig Godwinson, held as part of his Preston fee. In the 1300s the name Little Staynolf was used for Staynall, while Great Staynolf was the area now known as Stanah across the river in Thornton. The chapel of Stalmine was first mentioned about 1200 and a cemetery was consecrated in 1230. The chapel was rebuilt in 1806 when it was renamed St James.

Prior to the development of Fleetwood Docks, Wardleys was one of old docks on the Wyre Estuary. From as early as the last decade of the 16th century, goods from Russia were being unloaded here. In 1708 a customs office was established at Poulton-le-Fylde in connection with this dock and another at Skippool. Customs Officers would meet ships at the mouth of the river and guide them to the docks. Several warehouses had been built by the 1820s, supplying the textile spinning industry at Kirkham, and also a ship-yard which was primarily used for repair work.

== Governance ==
Stalmine-with-Staynall was once a township in the ancient parish of Lancaster. This became a civil parish in 1866, forming part of the Garstang Rural District from 1894 till 1974. The parish has six parish councillors.

Along with Hambleton, Stalmine-with-Staynall forms part of the Hambleton & Stalmine ward of Wyre Borough Council.

== Media gallery ==
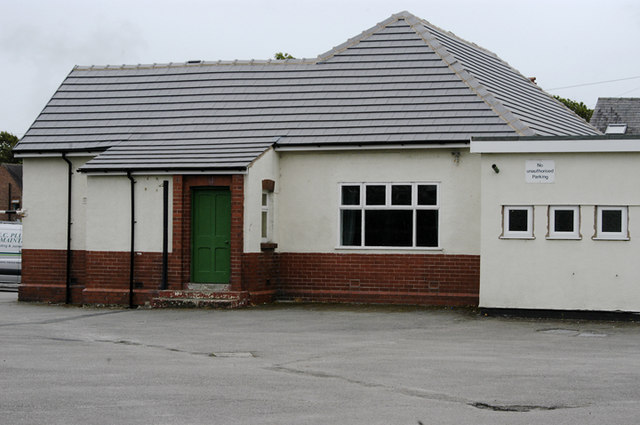
Stalmine village hall

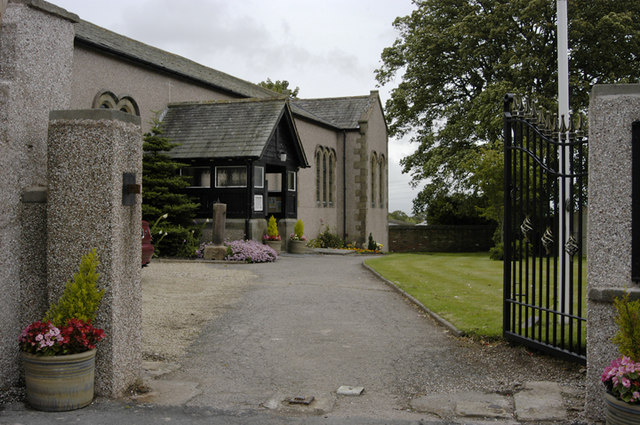
St.James church, Stalmine

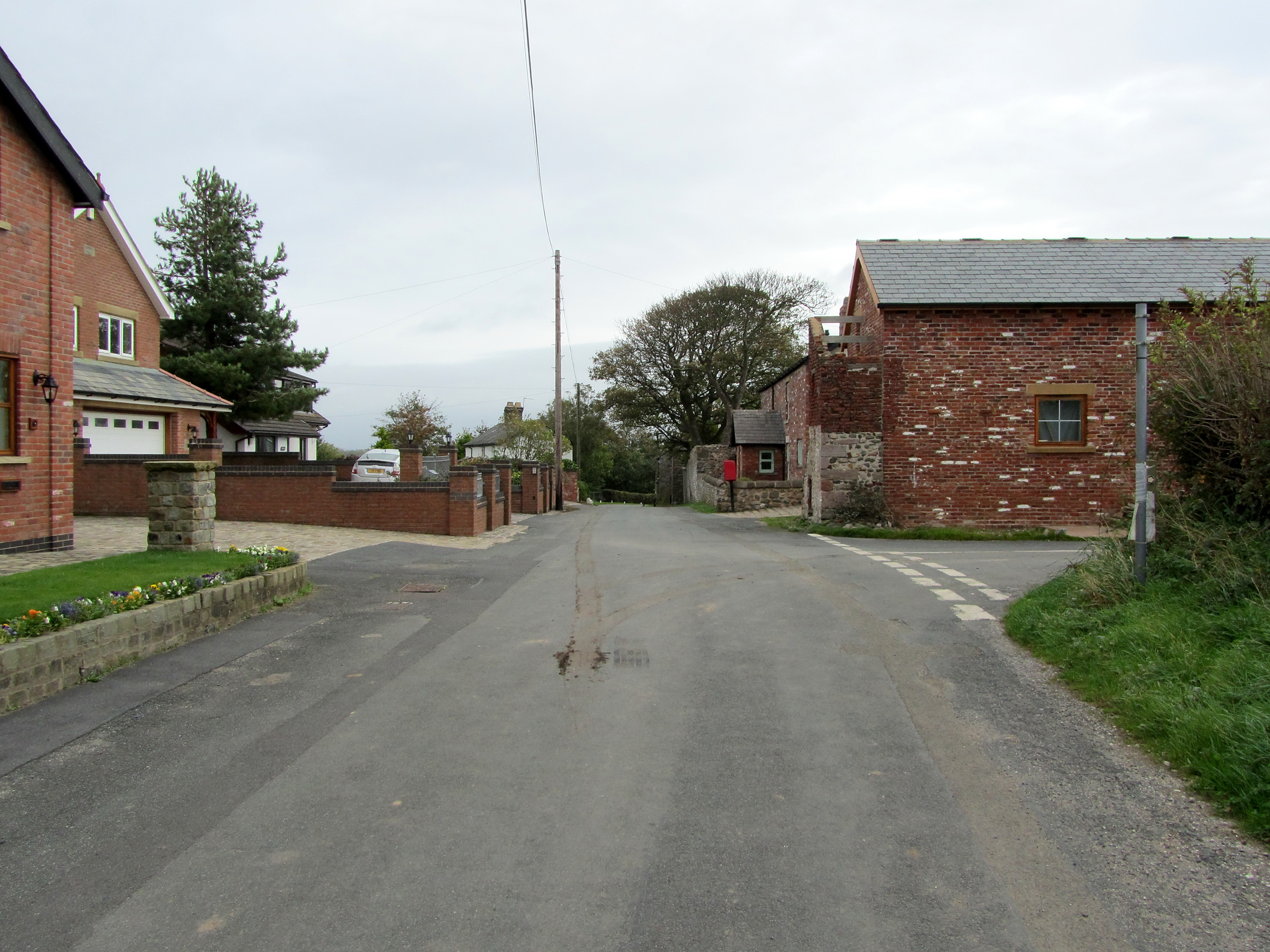
Staynall hamlet

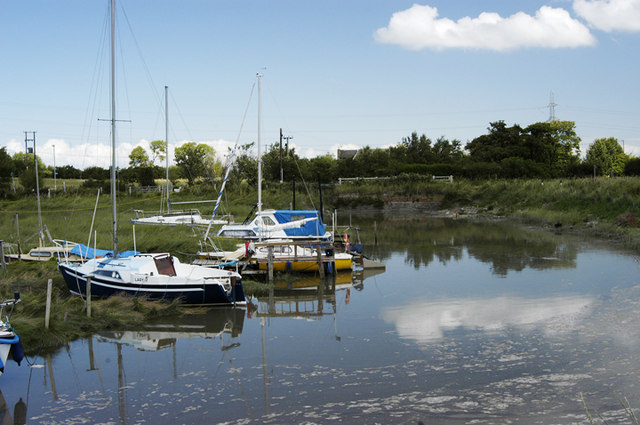
Wardley's Creek

== See also ==
- Listed buildings in Stalmine-with-Staynall
