= Cockle Hall =

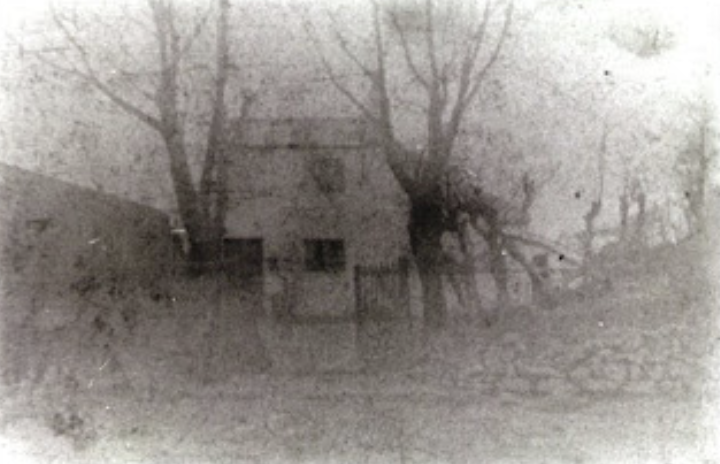
- A photograph of the cottage's facade, viewed from the river bank

- Location within Lancashire
- OS grid reference: SD361427
- District: Wyre
- Shire county: Lancashire
- Region: North West
- Country: England
- Sovereign state: United Kingdom
- Post town: Thornton-Cleveleys
- Postcode district: FY6
- Dialling code: 01253
- Police: Lancashire
- Fire: Lancashire
- Ambulance: North West

Cockle Hall is a historic location in Thornton-Cleveleys, Lancashire, England. Located in today's Wyre Estuary Country Park, it was the location of one of the earliest crossings of the River Wyre, and was used as such until the 1930s. It is also the former site of a two-storey cottage occupied by the Lawrenson family of thirteen. It was located a short distance along today's footpath running from the car park at Wyre Estuary, along the western banks of the river. The ferryman who took people to and brought people from Wardleys Creek, on the eastern side of the river, also lived there.

As C. Allen Clarke discovered, the original tenant of the cottage called himself the Squire of Cockle Hall, and said he was "the only squire this side o' th' Wyre". A former Roman road was reused in Victorian times by people walking from nearby Underbank Road to the ferry, across a hilly field. It is a public footpath today.

In the late 19th century, the Fleetwood Estate Company purchased the cottage from Peter Hesketh-Fleetwood. The cottage appears on the Ordnance Survey maps from the 1840s.

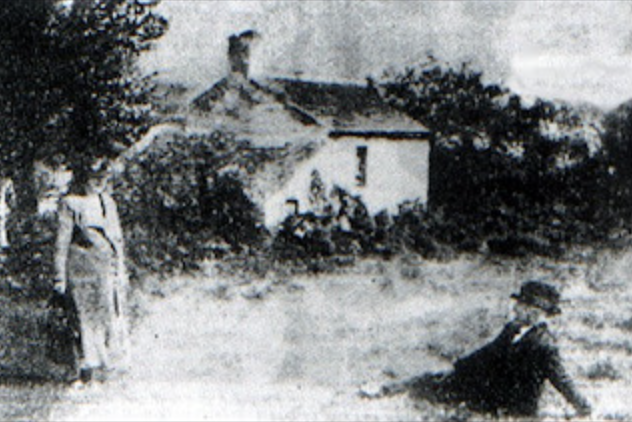
The rear of the cottage, viewed from the elevated field behind it

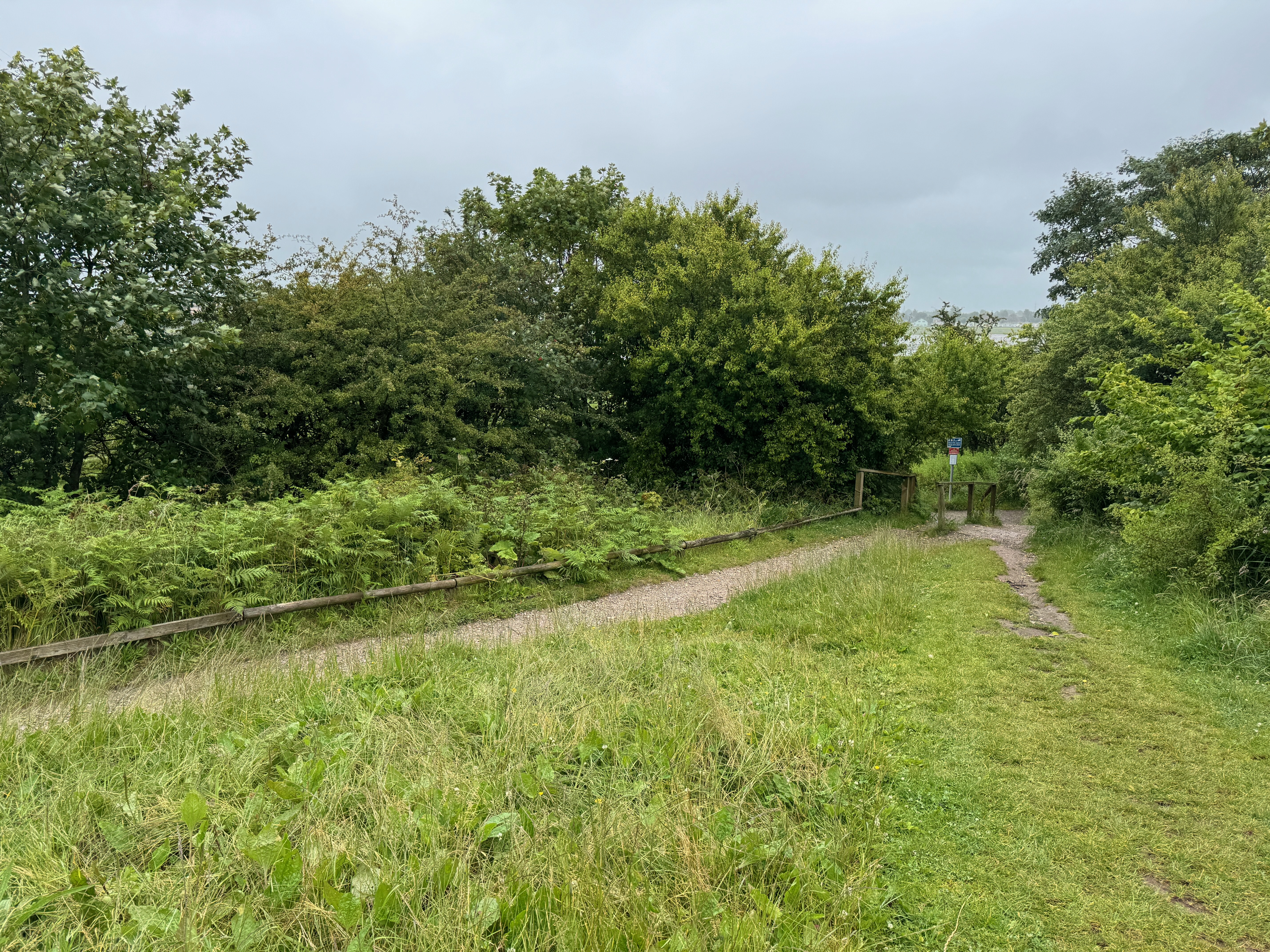
The same view in 2024

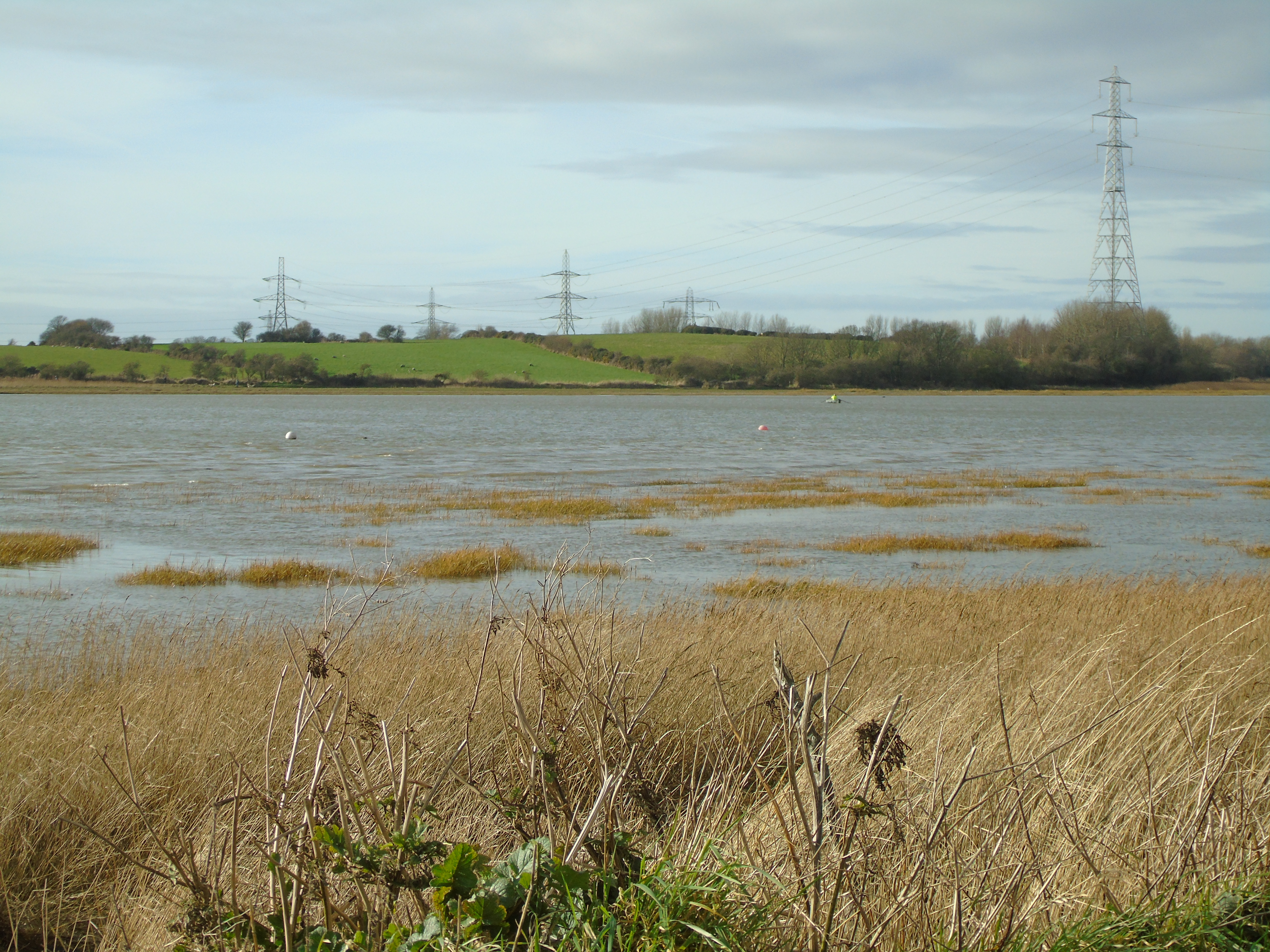
Viewed from Wardleys Creek
