= Hambleton Hall, Lancashire =

Hambleton Hall
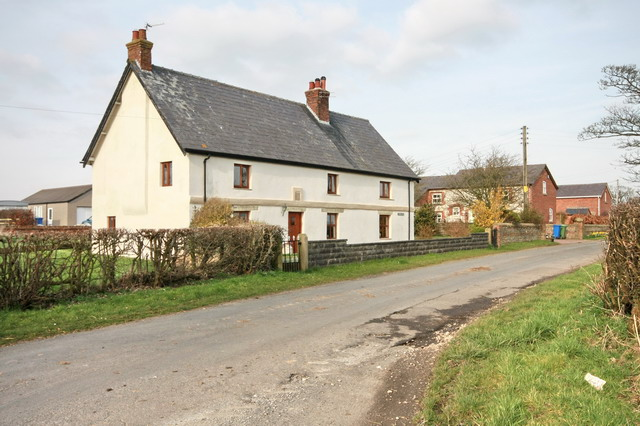
- The building in 2009

- Location within the Borough of Wyre Location within Lancashire Location within England
- 53.87198°N 2.94261°W
- Location: Hambleton, Lancashire, England

History
- Built: 1710 (316 years ago)

Site notes
- Area: Borough of Wyre

Listed Building – Grade II
- Designated: 17 April 1967
- Reference no.: 1361876

Hambleton Hall is a historic building in Hambleton, Lancashire, England. Built in 1710, it is a house in pebbledashed brick with a slate roof, in two storeys and three bays. There is a continuous rendered string course between the storeys. The windows are modern and have plain reveals. Above the doorway is an inscribed plaque.

== See also ==
- Listed buildings in Hambleton, Lancashire
