= Little Eccleston-with-Larbreck =

Civil parish in Lancashire, England

Coordinates: 53.858°N 2.891°W

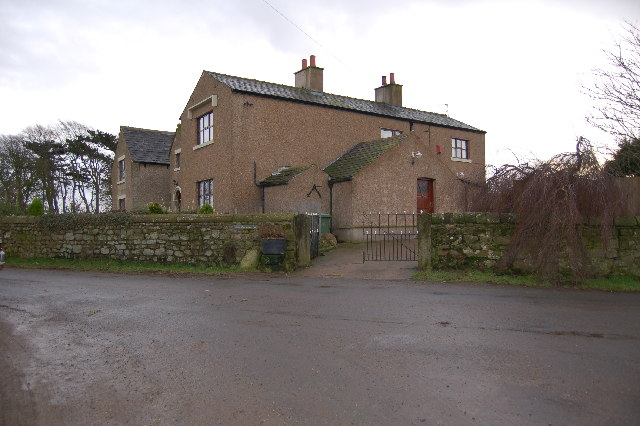
- Little Eccleston Hall Farm, Little Eccleston

- Shown within Fylde Borough Shown within the Fylde Location within Lancashire
- Population: 400 (2011)
- OS grid reference: SD413406
- Civil parish: Little Eccleston-with-Larbreck
- District: Fylde
- Shire county: Lancashire
- Region: North West
- Country: England
- Sovereign state: United Kingdom
- Post town: PRESTON
- Postcode district: PR3
- Dialling code: 01995
- Police: Lancashire
- Fire: Lancashire
- Ambulance: North West
- UK Parliament: Fylde
- Website: Little Eccleston with Larbreck Parish Council

Little Eccleston-with-Larbreck is a civil parish on the southern bank of the River Wyre on the Fylde in the English county of Lancashire. The population taken at the 2011 census was 400. The river is crossed by Cartford Bridge at grid reference SD421408 which, unusually for England, is a toll bridge. The Cartford Inn stands at the southern side of the bridge.

The main A586 road runs south of the village of Little Eccleston, dividing it from Great Eccleston. The port of Fleetwood is some 10 miles (16 km) downstream. Administratively it forms part of the Borough of Fylde. Larbreck is a hamlet at grid reference SD408406 about 1 mile (1.6 km) to the west.

== Gallery ==
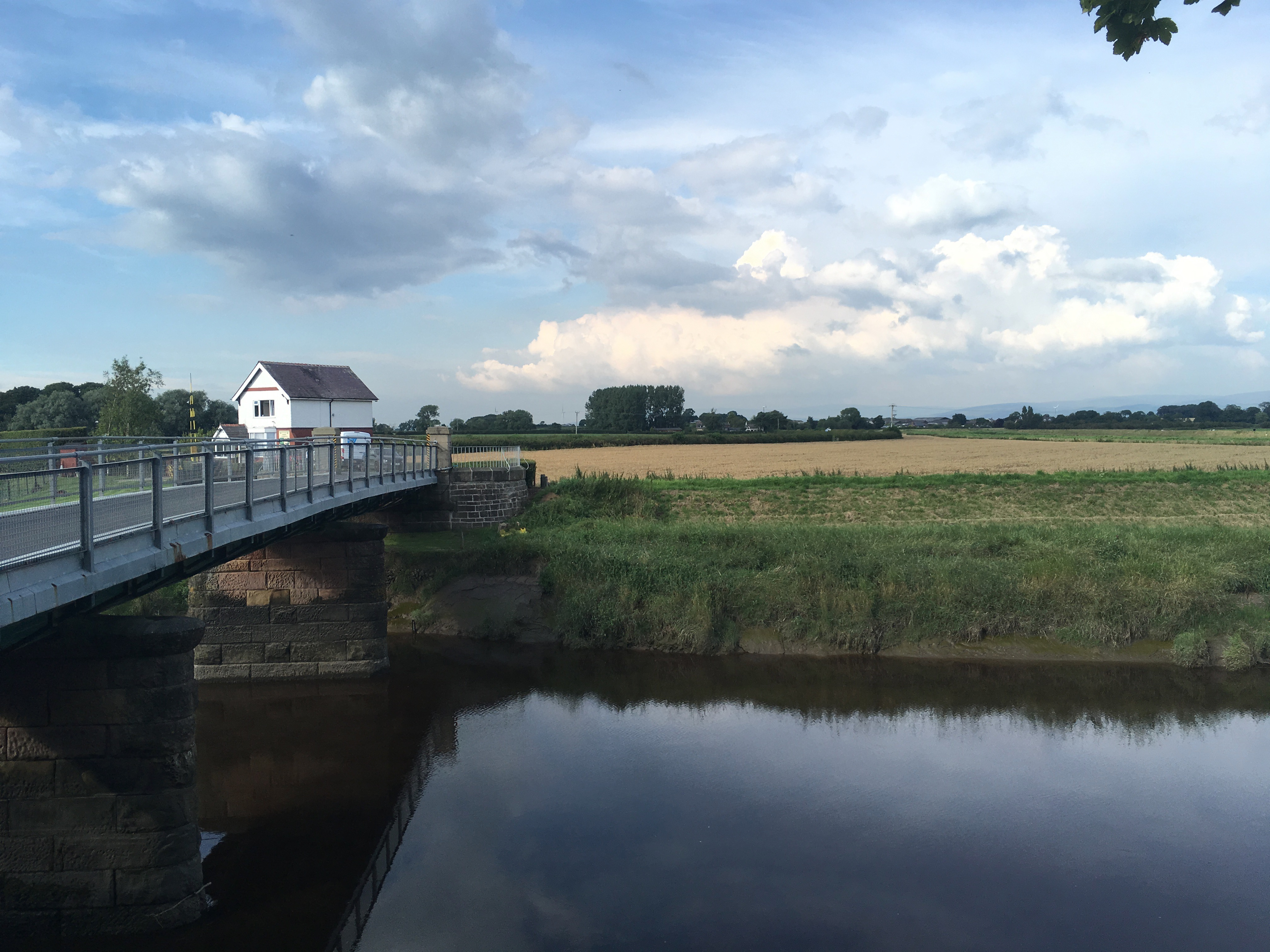
Cartford Bridge in 2017

== See also ==
- Listed buildings in Little Eccleston-with-Larbreck
