= Listed buildings in Hambleton, Lancashire =

Hambleton is a civil parish in the Wyre district of Lancashire, England. It contains two listed buildings that are recorded in the National Heritage List for England. Both the listed buildings are designated at Grade II, the lowest of the three grades, which is applied to "buildings of national importance and special interest". The parish contains the village of Hambleton and the surrounding countryside. The listed buildings comprise a house and a bridge.

== Buildings ==
Name and location	Photograph	Date	Notes
Hambleton Hall; 53.87198°N 2.94261°W		1710	A house in pebbledashed brick with a slate roof, in two storeys and three bays. There is a continuous rendered string course between the storeys. The windows are modern and have plain reveals. Above the doorway is an inscribed plaque.
Carr Bridge; 53.88705°N 2.95455°W	—	Early 19th century (probable)	The bridge carries a road over a drainage channel. It is in sandstone and consists of a single segmental arch with a narrow channel. The bridge has a solid parapet with a string course and coping.
