= Listed buildings in Stalmine-with-Staynall =

Stalmine-with-Staynall is a civil parish in the Wyre district of Lancashire, England. It contains four listed buildings that are recorded in the National Heritage List for England. All the listed buildings are designated at Grade II, the lowest of the three grades, which is applied to "buildings of national importance and special interest". The parish contains the villages of Stalmine and Staynall, and the surrounding countryside. The listed buildings consist of two farmhouses, a church and a heated garden wall.

== Buildings ==
Name and location	Photograph	Date	Notes
Town End Farmhouse; 53.89876°N 2.95872°W	—	1694	The farmhouse is in brick with a thatched roof covered in corrugated asbestos. It has 1 1/2 storeys and two bays. The windows have plain reveals; some of them are sashes, others are modern. Above the doorway is an inscribed plaque, and inside the house is an encased bressumer.
Danson's Farmhouse; 53.88767°N 2.97309°W	—	1709	The lower part of the walls of the farmhouse are in cobble and the upper parts are in brick. The house has two storeys and three bays. The windows are horizontal sliding sashes. The doorway has a rendered surround and above it is an inscribed plaque. Inside the house is a bressumer.
St James' Church; 53.90207°N 2.95327°W		1806	Located adjacent to the Seven Stars public house. The church was remodelled in about 1880. It is in rendered and pebbledashed stone with quoins, a roof of Westmorland slate, and is in Romanesque style. The church has a cruciform plan, consisting of a nave with a south timber porch, transepts, and a short chancel. On the west gable is a double bellcote. The windows have round heads. Inside the church is a west gallery.
The Peach Wall; 53.90282°N 2.95342°W	—	Early 19th century	Two sides of a former heated garden wall in brick on stone foundations and with sandstone dressings. It has sides of about 51 metres (167 ft) and 41 metres (135 ft) with curved corners, and is between 3 metres (9.8 ft) and 5 metres (16 ft) high. The wall has two skins with flues running between them, and fireplaces to create the heat.
