= Over Wyre =

Group of villages in Lancashire, England

Coordinates: 53.968°N 2.816°W

Over Wyre villages shown on the Fylde
Over Wyre villages shown within the Borough of Wyre

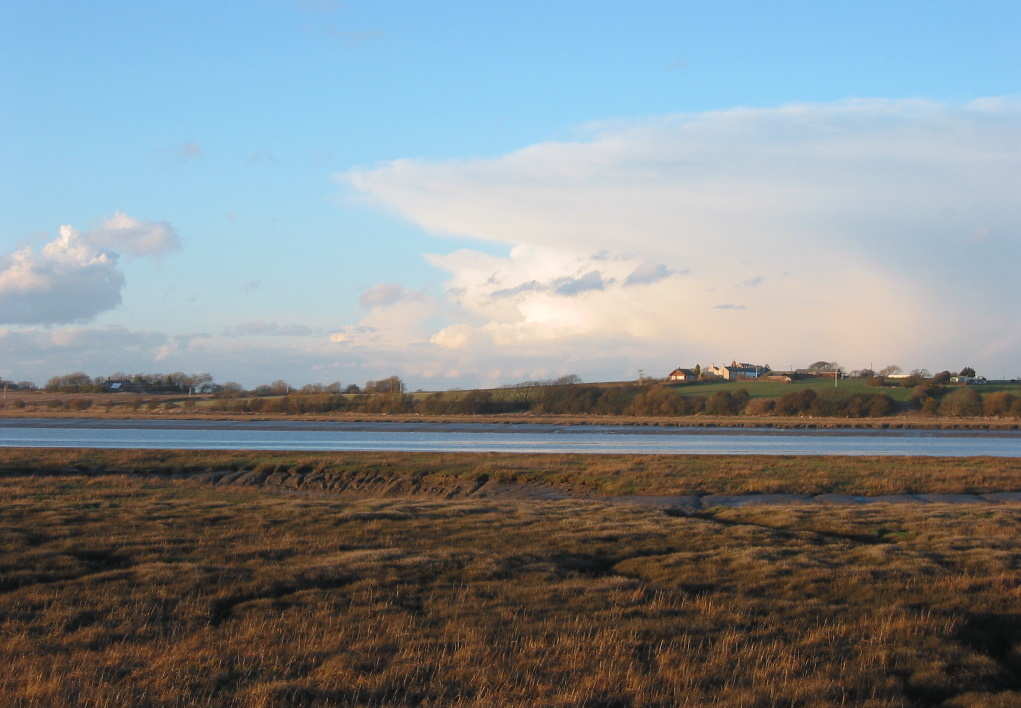
Looking across the River Wyre towards Over Wyre

Over Wyre is the collective name given to a group of villages in Lancashire, England, situated on the Fylde, to the north and east of the River Wyre. The group is usually considered to include Hambleton, Stalmine, Knott End-on-Sea, Preesall, Pilling and Out Rawcliffe. The name distinguishes these villages from the larger southern part of the Fylde, between the Wyre and the Ribble, which includes the urban areas of Blackpool, Poulton-le-Fylde, Thornton, Cleveleys, Fleetwood and Lytham St Annes.
