= Hambleton, Lancashire =

Village in Lancashire, England

Coordinates: 53.875°N 2.952°W

Hambleton
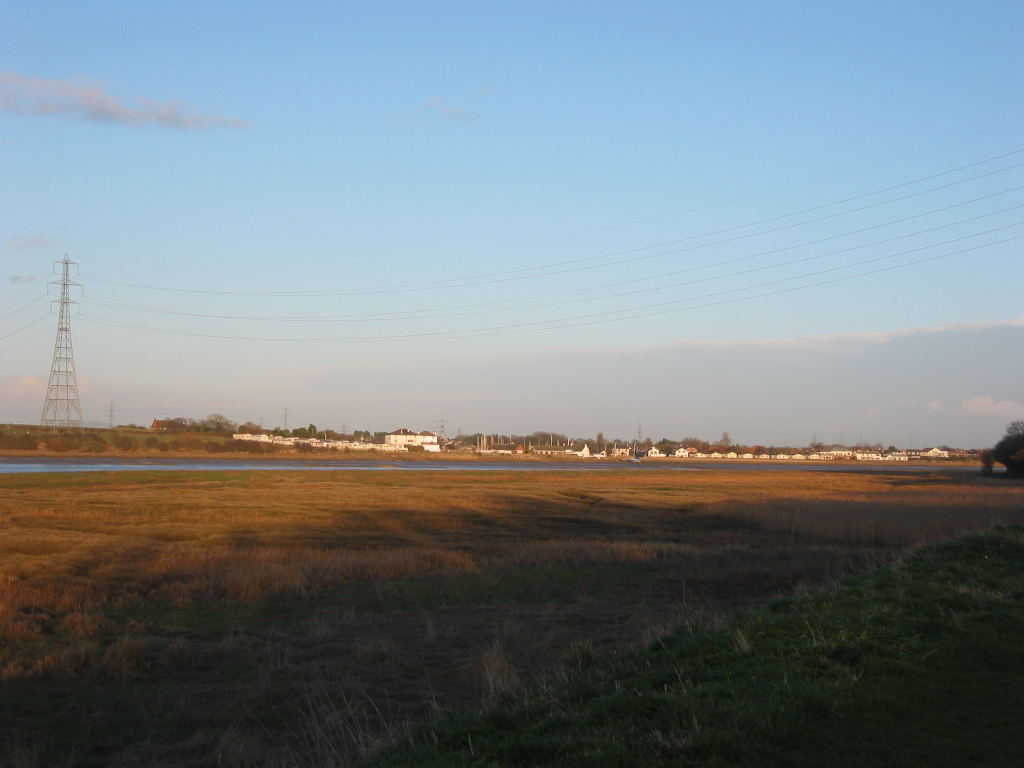
- Wardleys Pub, in Hambleton, viewed from Stanah on the western side of the River Wyre

- Shown within Wyre Borough Shown on the Fylde Location within Lancashire
- Population: 2,744 (2011 census)
- OS grid reference: SD374425
- Civil parish: Hambleton
- District: Wyre
- Shire county: Lancashire
- Region: North West
- Country: England
- Sovereign state: United Kingdom
- Post town: POULTON-LE-FYLDE
- Postcode district: FY6
- Dialling code: 01253
- Police: Lancashire
- Fire: Lancashire
- Ambulance: North West
- UK Parliament: Lancaster and Wyre

Hambleton is a village and civil parish in the English county of Lancashire. It is situated on a coastal plain called the Fylde and in an area east of the River Wyre known locally as Over Wyre. Hambleton lies approximately 3 miles (4.8 km) north-east of its post town, Poulton-le-Fylde, and about 7 miles (11 km) north-east of the seaside resort of Blackpool. In the 2001 United Kingdom census, the parish had a population of 2,678, increasing to 2,744 at the 2011 census.

Hambleton is part of the Borough of Wyre.

== History ==
Hambleton was recorded as Hameltune in the Domesday Book of 1086 and as Hamelton in the 12th century. By the 16th century, the spelling was Hambleton.

At the time of the Norman Conquest of England in 1066, Hambleton was a small township in the ancient hundred of Amounderness, in the possession of King Harold II's brother Earl Tostig. The area of the township was assessed as two carucates or ploughlands. Historically, Hambleton was part of the ecclesiastical parish of Kirkham and the parishioners would have worshipped at the church of St Michael, approximately 10 miles (16 km) away from Hambleton. A chapel of ease had been built in the village by the 16th century, dedicated to the Blessed Virgin Mary. The chapel was consecrated in 1567.

== Governance ==
Hambleton is governed locally by a parish council. The civil parish, along with Stalmine-with-Staynall, forms the ward of Hambleton and Stalmine-with-Staynall. The population of this ward at the 2011 Census was 4,230. The ward has two elected councillors. Hambleton was formerly part of the rural district of Garstang. In 1974, the district merged with those of Fleetwood, Thornton-Cleveleys, Poulton-le-Fylde and Preesall to form Wyre Borough Council.

The village is represented in the House of Commons of the Parliament of the United Kingdom as part of Lancaster and Wyre. It elects one MP by the first past the post system of election.

== Demography ==
At the 2001 UK census, the civil parish of Hambleton had a population of 2,678. The 2001 population density for the ward of Hambleton and Stalmine-with-Staynall was 2.61 per hectare, with a 100 to 93.0 female-to-male ratio. The proportion of residents who classified themselves as White was 99.5%, a figure higher than those for Wyre (98.9%), the North West (94.4%) and England (90.9%).

Hambleton and Stalmine-with-Staynall's 1,796 households included 27.7% one-person households, 41.5% married couples living together (with or without children), 5.9% co-habiting couples, and 5.5% single parents with their children.

=== Population change ===
Population growth in Hambleton since 1801
Year	1801	1811	1821	1831	1841	1851	1861	1871	1881	1891	1901	1911	1921	1931	1941	1951	1961	1971	1981	1991	2001	2011
Population	252	273	338	334	349	346	366	351	389	367	321	387	451	550	—	756	836				2,678	2,744

== Landmarks and community ==
Hambleton Hall is an 18th-century house that has been designated a Grade II listed building by English Heritage.

Due to Hambleton being considered a rural settlement, there is a small number of full-time jobs available in the village. The majority of employed residents commute to Preston, Lancaster and Blackpool which has caused a rise in traffic congestion within and around the village in recent years.

== Religion and education ==
Hambleton's Anglican parish church, dedicated to the Blessed Virgin Mary, was rebuilt in 1749. It forms part of the benefice of The Waterside Parishes of Hambleton, Out Rawcliffe and Preesall, and is in the Diocese of Blackburn. The village had a Roman Catholic church, dedicated to Francis of Assisi, which was in the Diocese of Lancaster. It was built in 1979 as a chapel of ease to St Mary's in Great Eccleston, but has since been demolished. Hambleton also has a United Reformed church, which hosts the Hambleton choral group community choir which was founded here in 1975.

Hambleton has one primary school.

== Transport ==
The railway came to the Fylde in the first half of the 19th century; the Preston and Wyre Railway line was completed in 1840. The nearest railway station to Hambleton is Poulton-le-Fylde, which connects to major national train routes at Preston railway station. Hambleton lies on the A588 road between Poulton and Lancaster.

Hambleton's nearest international airports are Liverpool John Lennon Airport and Manchester Airport.

The 5C bus service that is run by Blackpool Transport serves the village. Buses to Knott End-on-Sea and Blackpool run every forty minutes.

Stagecoach operate service 88 at 7am in the Morning to Lancaster and return bus gets back at 4pm.

== Notable people ==
- Tom Bradshaw (1879–1930), footballer, played over 100 games
- Derek Spence (born 1952), footballer, played 348 games and 29 for Northern Ireland; he owned the village off-licence during the 1990s
- Phil Clarkson (born 1968), footballer, played 363 games, including 171 for Blackpool
- Carl Myerscough (born 1979), former track and field athlete, Commonwealth games bronze medallist in shot put and discus.

== See also ==
- Listed buildings in Hambleton, Lancashire
- Wardleys Pub
