= River Wyre =

River in Lancashire, England

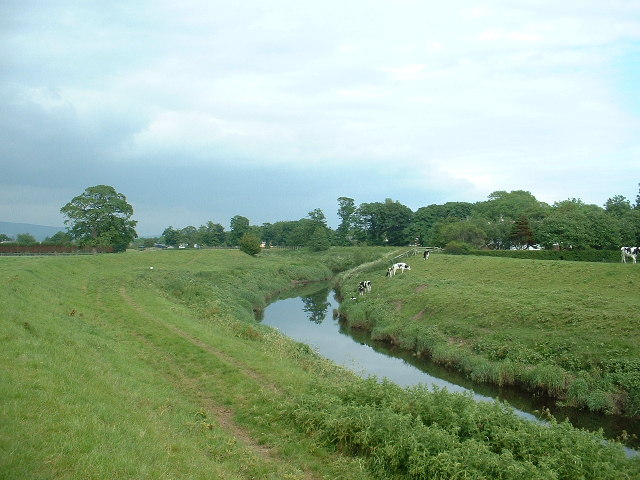
- The Wyre near St Michael's on Wyre

Location
- Country: England
- County: Lancashire

Physical characteristics
- Source: Tarnbrook Wyre and Marshaw Wyre
  - location: Forest of Bowland
- Mouth: Irish Sea
  - location: Between Fleetwood and Knott End
  - coordinates: 53°55′42″N 3°00′08″W
- Length: 28 mi (45 km)

Wyre estuary shown within Lancashire
(grid reference SD340479)

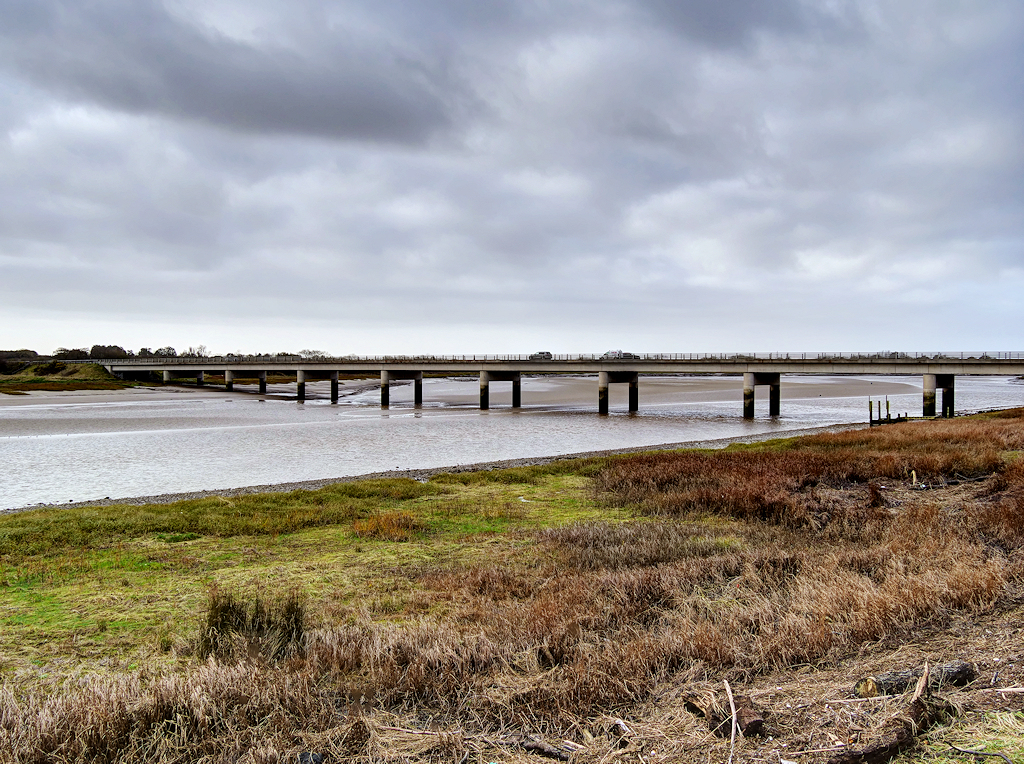
Shard Bridge spans the River Wyre between Hambleton and Singleton

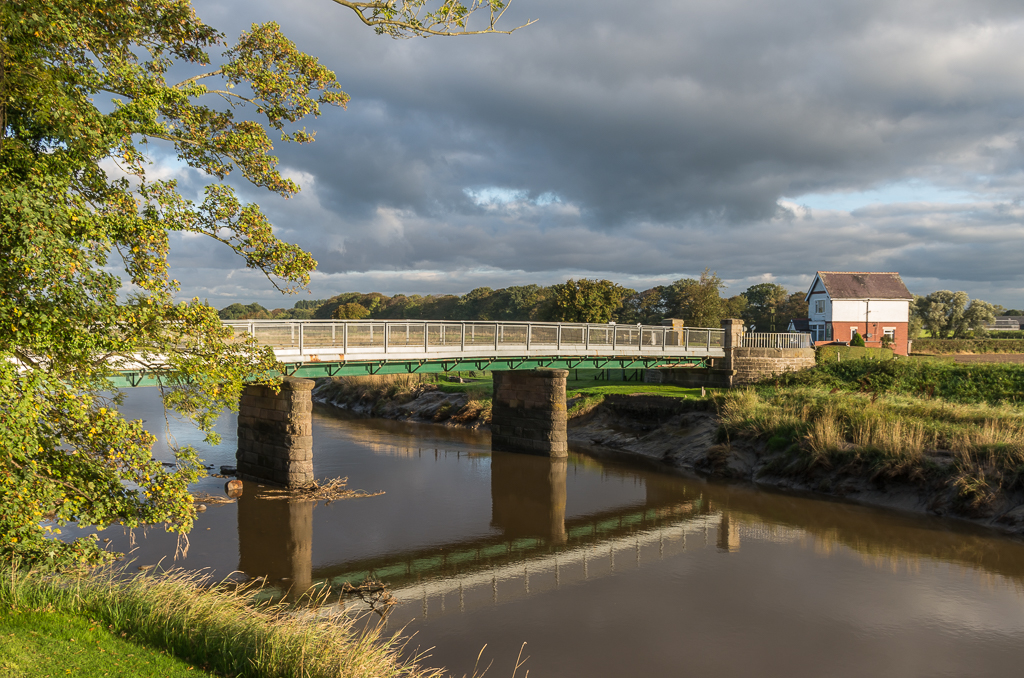
Cartford Bridge spanning the river

The River Wyre, in Lancashire, England, flows into the Irish Sea at Fleetwood. It is 28 miles (45 km) long and has a sheltered estuary which penetrates deep into the Fylde peninsula.

== Etymology ==
The name Wyre is of pre-Roman, likely, if specific, Common Brittonic origin. It may be derived from *wiΣ-, (Note: In reconstructed Brittonic words, Σ represents a sound somewhere between [s] and [h]; perhaps an aspirated [ʃʰ].) a form of the element *wei, with a basic sense of "flowing", with the suffix *–urā.

The River Wyre possibly shares its etymology with other river names, including the Wear in County Durham and the Quair Water in Scotland.

The river's name possibly means 'winding river' in Celtic.

== Geography ==
The river rises in the Forest of Bowland in central Lancashire, as two distinct tributaries—the Tarnbrook Wyre and the Marshaw Wyre—whose confluence is near the village of Abbeystead. In 1984, a pumping station, built just below the confluence as part of a water transfer scheme in the 1980s, saw the Abbeystead disaster, an explosion in which 16 people were killed and a further 22 were injured.

From Abbeystead, the river flows south through Dolphinholme to Garstang, where the Lancaster Canal crosses on a small aqueduct. 1 mile (1.6 km) south, at Catterall, it meets its first major tributary, the River Calder. The river then turns westwards, flowing through St Michael's on Wyre, where it is joined by its second major tributary, the River Brock. It becomes tidal below the weir at St Michael's.

It is crossed by Cartford Bridge, a toll bridge, between Little Eccleston and Out Rawcliffe. A former toll bridge, Shard Bridge, close to Poulton-le-Fylde, has been rebuilt and is now free. The Wyre Estuary Ferry runs between Fleetwood and Knott End, but the ferry to the Isle of Man no longer runs.

Major industry existed at the former ICI Hillhouse site at Burn Naze, close to the estuary of the river. It was originally an alkali works taking brine from mines and wells across the river in and around Preesall. Later processes undertaken on the site included those dealing with vinyl chloride monomer, although this was later moved to Runcorn and ICI activity on the site ceased. Industrial activity by a number of various companies continues by the river, albeit on a much reduced scale.

The area around Burn Naze on the western side of the Wyre Estuary was formerly known as Bergerode, believed to be an Old English term for "shallow harbour", beor grade.

From Skippool, just downstream of Shard Bridge, to Fleetwood, the banks of the river form the Wyre Estuary Country Park. Facilities exist on the western bank. The park has its headquarters at Stanah. It has been the recipient of a Green Flag Award.

Fleetwood, at the mouth of the river, was a major fishing port up until the latter part of the 20th century. Wyre Dock was built there between 1869 and 1877. With the decline in the size of the fleet, most of the dock complex has subsequently been converted to a marina and the adjacent Affinity Lancashire outdoor shopping centre.

The river drains a total catchment area of approximately 175 square miles (450 km^{2}). The tidal portion of the river below Cartford Bridge drains a catchment area of approximately 125 square miles (320 km^{2}).

The Wyre is the only one of the major Lancashire rivers that flows wholly within the ceremonial county; the Ribble starts in North Yorkshire, and the Lune starts in Cumbria.

== Settlements ==
=== River Wyre ===
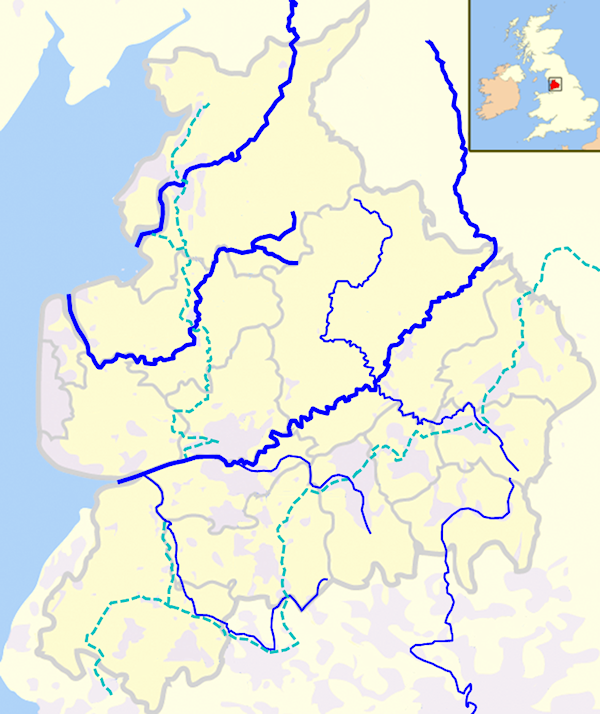
Shown within Lancashire
- Fleetwood
- Knott End-on-Sea
- Stanah
- Thornton
- Hambleton
- Skippool
- Little Singleton
- Out Rawcliffe
- Little Eccleston
- Great Eccleston
- St Michael's on Wyre
- Churchtown
- Catterall
- Garstang
- Cabus
- Scorton
- Hollins Lane
- Dolphinholme
- Abbeystead

=== Marshaw Wyre ===
- Marshaw

=== Tarnbrook Wyre ===
- Lower Lee
- Tarnbrook

== Tributaries ==
=== River Wyre ===
- Hillylaid Pool
- Wardley's Pool
- Peg's Pool
- Skippool Creek
  - Main Dyke
    - Lucas Flash
- Calder Brook
- Wall Mill Pool
  - Thistleton Brook
    - Medlar Brook
    - Scholar Brook
- River Brock
  - Yoad Pool
  - New Draught
    - Old River Brock
      - Bacchus Brook
      - Bull Brook
    - Withney Dike
    - Woodplumpton Brook
      - Swill Brook
      - Blundel Brook
    - New Mill Brook
      - Barton Brook
        - Dean Brook
        - Sparling Brook
          - Factory Brook
        - Westfield Brook
          - Mill Brook
            - Whinnyclough Brook
              - Bullsnape Brook
  - Blay Brook
  - Lickhurst Brook
  - Huds Brook
  - Winsnape Brook
  - Clough Heads Brook
- Longback Brook
- Ains Pool
- River Calder
  - Little Calder River
  - Nanny Brook
  - Calder Dyke
  - East Grain
  - North Grain
- Parkhead Brook
- Grizedale Brook
  - Oxen Beck
- Tithe Barn Brook
- Park Brook
- Foxhouses Brook
  - Lordshouse Brook
- Street Brook
- Damas Gill
- Sparrow Gill
- Caw Brook
  - Smithy Beck
- Gallows Clough
- Hall Gill
- Parson's Brook
  - Joshua's Beck
- Cam Brook
- Lainsley Slack

=== Marshaw Wyre ===
- Marshaw Wyre
  - Inchaclough
  - White Syke
  - Bull Beck
  - Well Brook
    - Meer Brook
  - Black Clough
    - Tail Clough
  - Trough Brook
  - Threapshaw Clough

=== Tarnbrook Wyre ===
- Tarnbrook Wyre
  - River Grizedale
    - Castle Syke
    - Grizedale Brook
      - Lower Within Syke
      - Higher Within Syke
  - Wood Syke
    - Stick Close Beck
  - Thorn Clough
  - Fall Clough
  - Tarn Syke
    - Thrush Clough
  - Higher Syke
  - Delph Beck
    - White Moor Clough
    - Swine Clough
    - Deer Clough
  - Small Clough
  - Gavells Clough
  - Hare Syke

== See also ==
- Wyre Way
