= Listed buildings in Lancashire =

Historic buildings in Lancshire, UK

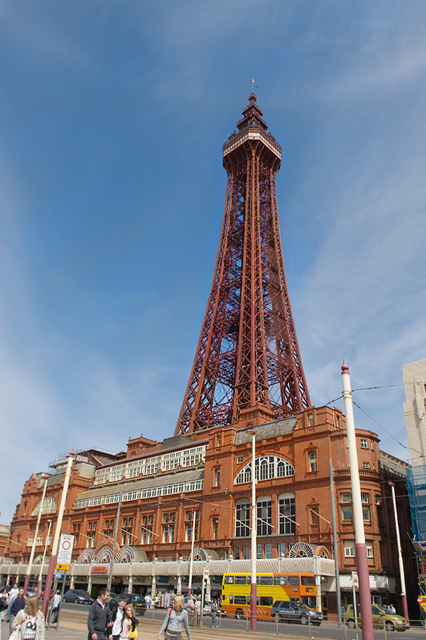
Blackpool Tower, Blackpool

There are a number of listed buildings in Lancashire. The term "listed building", in the United Kingdom, refers to a building or structure designated as being of special architectural, historical, or cultural significance. Details of all the listed buildings are contained in the National Heritage List for England. They are categorised in three grades: Grade I consists of buildings of outstanding architectural or historical interest, Grade II* includes significant buildings of more than local interest and Grade II consists of buildings of special architectural or historical interest. Buildings in England are listed by the Secretary of State for Culture, Media and Sport on recommendations provided by English Heritage, which also determines the grading.

Some listed buildings are looked after by the National Trust or English Heritage while others are in private ownership or administered by trusts.

There are over 5000 listed structures in Lancashire. Although most structures on the lists are buildings, other structures such as bridges, monuments, sculptures, war memorials, milestones and mileposts or telephone kiosks may be listed. In Lancashire 70 structures are classified as Grade I (buildings of outstanding architectural or historic interest) and 256 are classified as Grade II* (particularly significant buildings of more than local interest). The remaining 4901 are classified as Grade II.

== Listed buildings by grade ==
- Grade I listed buildings in Lancashire
  - Grade I listed churches in Lancashire
- Grade II* listed buildings in Lancashire

== Listed buildings by district or unitary authority ==
Within each local government district, buildings are listed by civil parish or unparished area.

=== Blackburn with Darwen ===
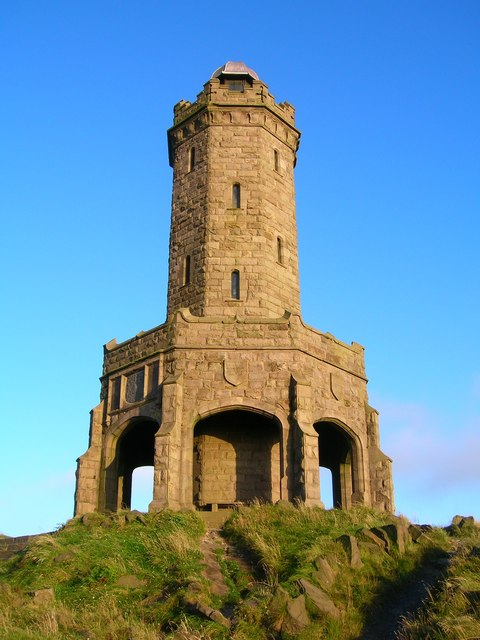
Jubilee Tower, Darwen

- Listed buildings in Blackburn
- Listed buildings in Darwen
- Listed buildings in Eccleshill, Lancashire
- Listed buildings in Hoddlesden
- Listed buildings in Livesey
- Listed buildings in North Turton
- Listed buildings in Pleasington
- Listed buildings in Tockholes
- Listed buildings in Yate and Pickup Bank

=== Blackpool ===
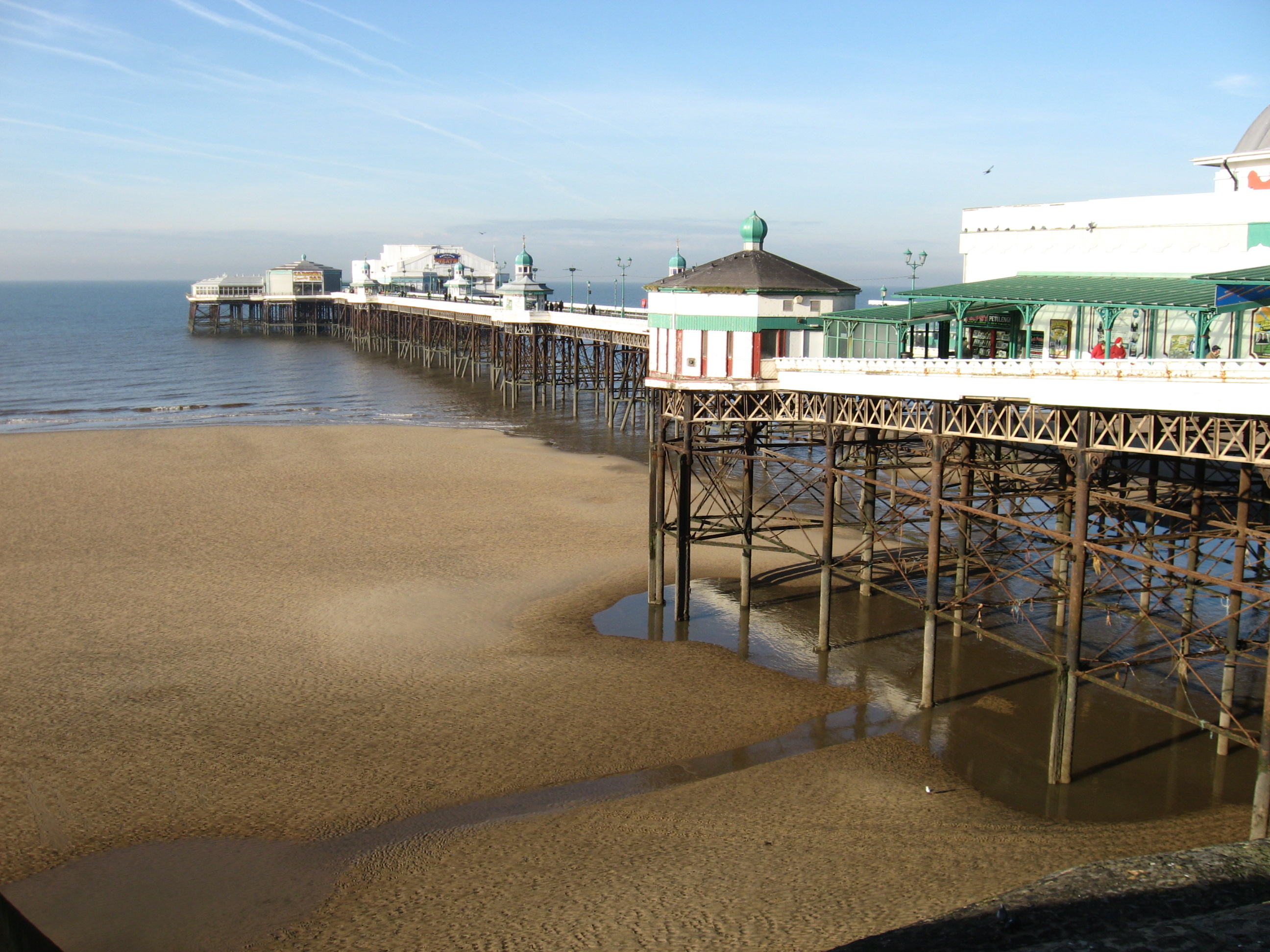
North Pier, Blackpool

- Listed buildings in Blackpool

=== Burnley ===
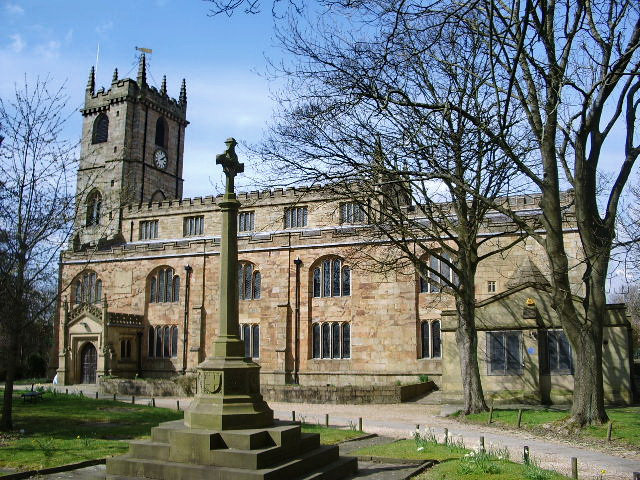
St Peter's Church, Burnley

- Listed buildings in Briercliffe
- Listed buildings in Burnley
- Listed buildings in Cliviger
- Listed buildings in Habergham Eaves
- Listed buildings in Hapton, Lancashire
- Listed buildings in Ightenhill
- Listed buildings in Padiham
- Listed buildings in Worsthorne-with-Hurstwood

=== Chorley ===
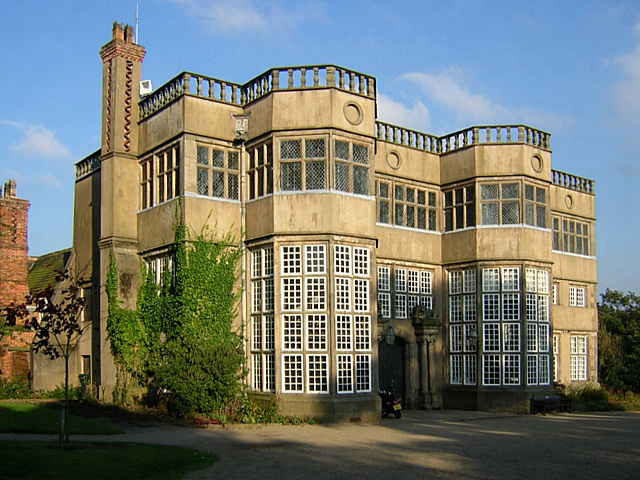
Astley Hall, Chorley

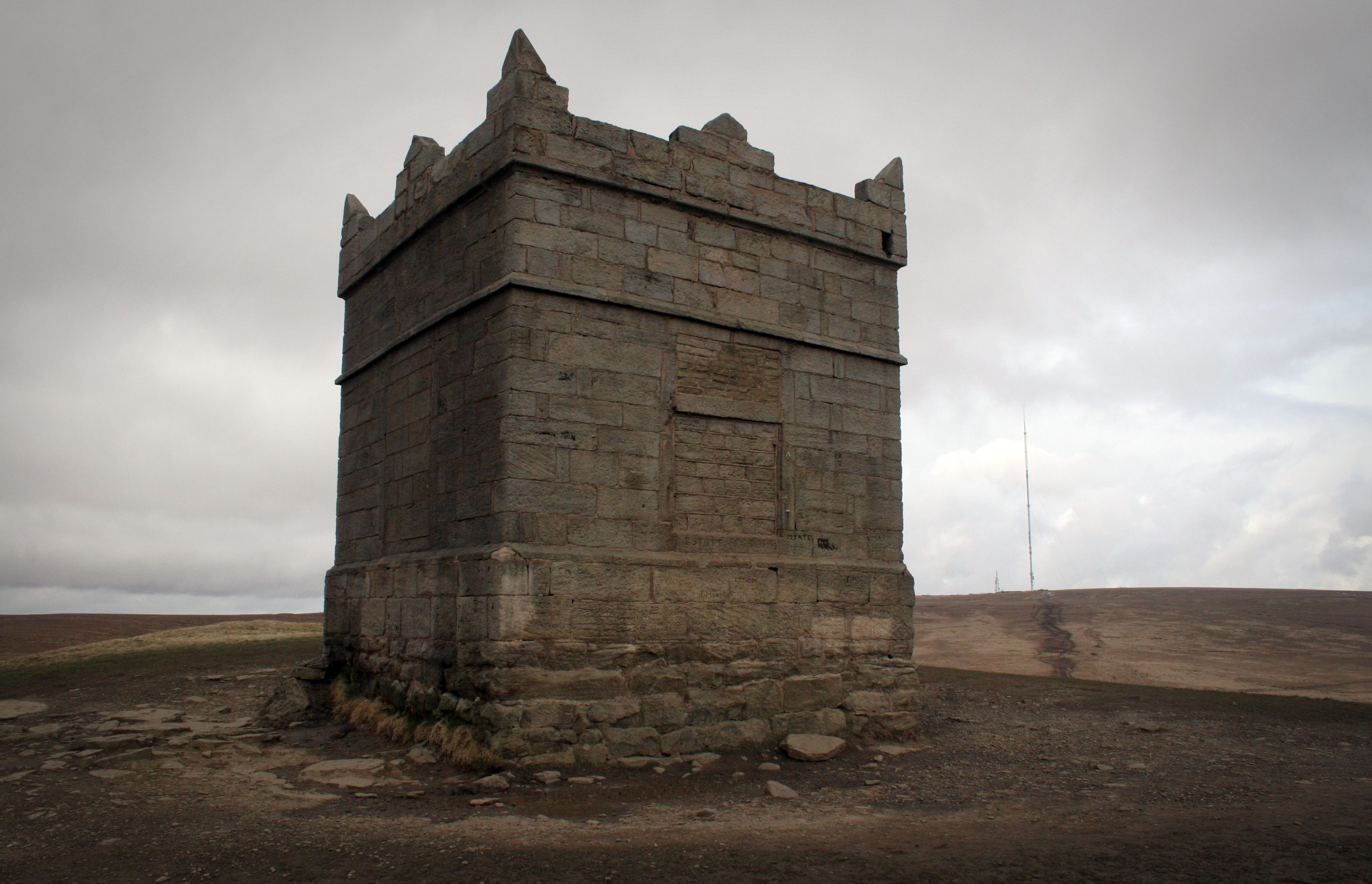
Rivington Pike Tower, Rivington

- Listed buildings in Adlington, Lancashire
- Listed buildings in Anderton, Lancashire
- Listed buildings in Anglezarke
- Listed buildings in Bretherton
- Listed buildings in Brindle, Lancashire
- Listed buildings in Charnock Richard
- Listed buildings in Chorley
- Listed buildings in Clayton-le-Woods
- Listed buildings in Coppull
- Listed buildings in Croston
- Listed buildings in Cuerden
- Listed buildings in Eccleston, Lancashire
- Listed buildings in Euxton
- Listed buildings in Heapey
- Listed buildings in Heath Charnock
- Listed buildings in Heskin
- Listed buildings in Hoghton
- Listed buildings in Mawdesley
- Listed buildings in Rivington
- Listed buildings in Ulnes Walton
- Listed buildings in Wheelton
- Listed buildings in Whittle-le-Woods
- Listed buildings in Withnell

=== Fylde ===
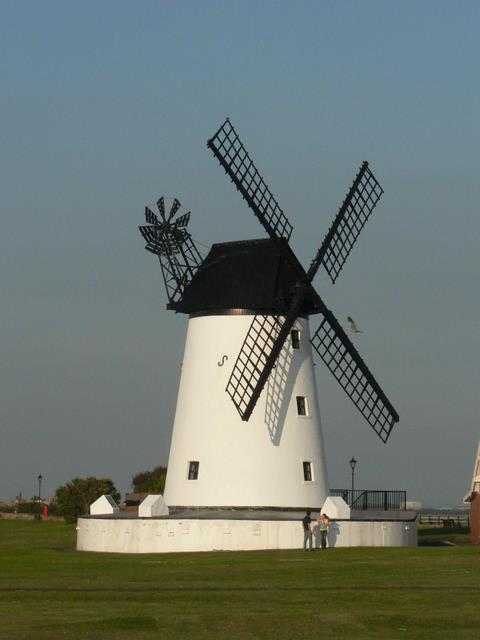
Lytham Windmill, Lytham

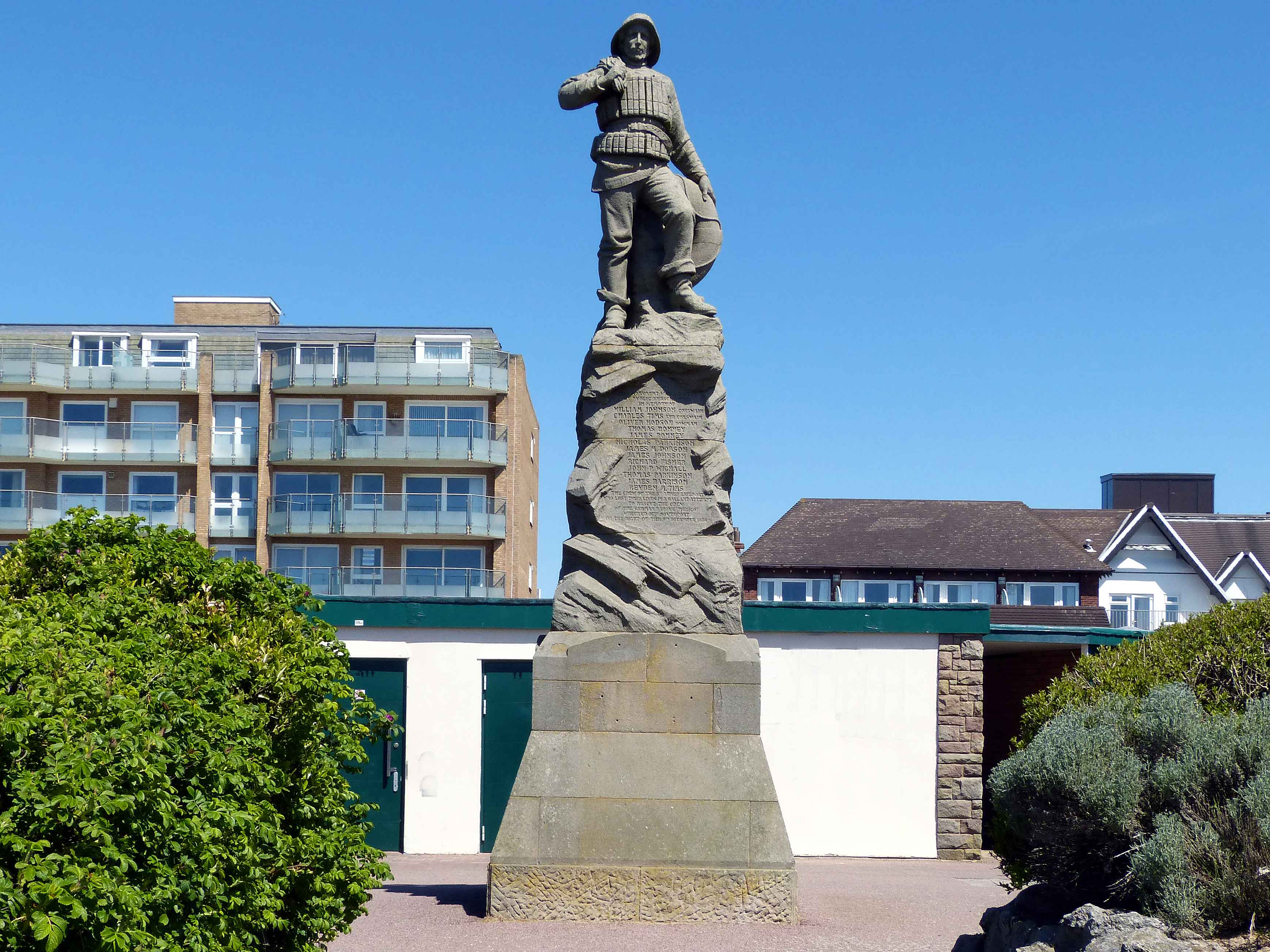
Lifeboat Monument, St Annes

- Listed buildings in Bryning-with-Warton
- Listed buildings in Elswick, Lancashire
- Listed buildings in Freckleton
- Listed buildings in Greenhalgh-with-Thistleton
- Listed buildings in Kirkham, Lancashire
- Listed buildings in Little Eccleston-with-Larbreck
- Listed buildings in Lytham
- Listed buildings in Medlar-with-Wesham
- Listed buildings in Newton-with-Clifton
- Listed buildings in Ribby-with-Wrea
- Listed buildings in Saint Anne's on the Sea
- Listed buildings in Singleton, Lancashire
- Listed buildings in Staining, Lancashire
- Listed buildings in Treales, Roseacre and Wharles
- Listed buildings in Weeton-with-Preese
- Listed buildings in Westby-with-Plumptons

=== Hyndburn ===
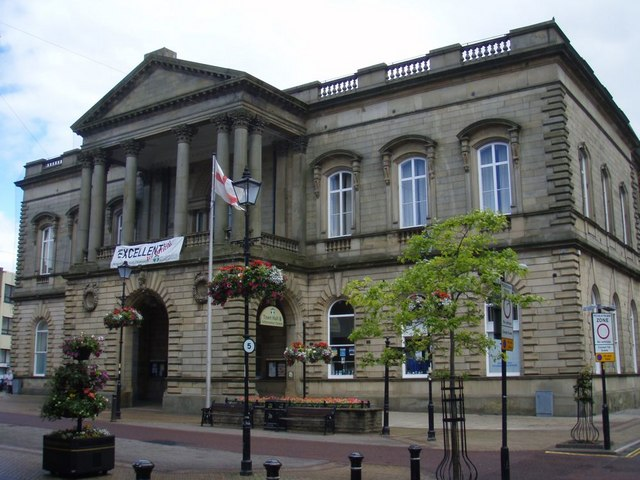
Town Hall, Accrington

- Listed buildings in Accrington
- Listed buildings in Altham, Lancashire
- Listed buildings in Church, Lancashire
- Listed buildings in Clayton-le-Moors
- Listed buildings in Great Harwood
- Listed buildings in Oswaldtwistle
- Listed buildings in Rishton

=== Lancaster ===
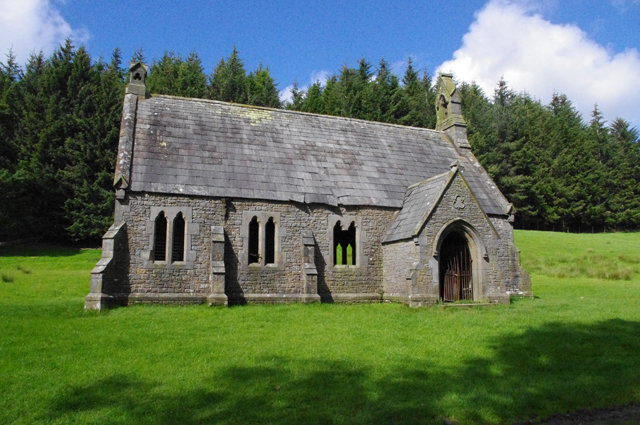
Littledale Free Church, Caton with Littledale

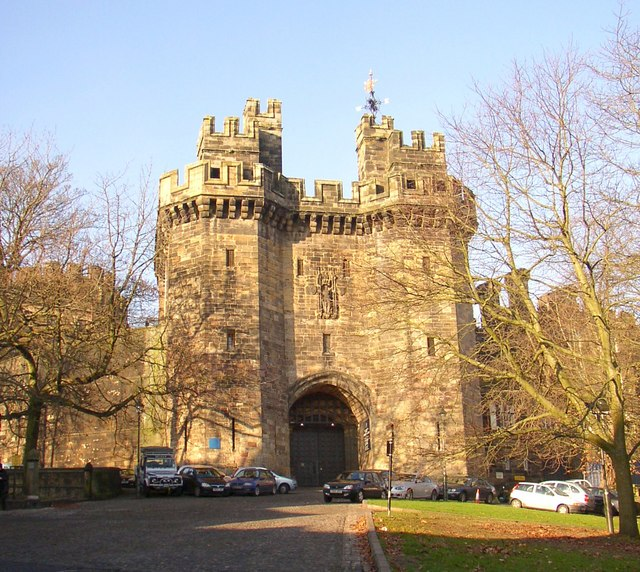
Lancaster Castle, Lancaster

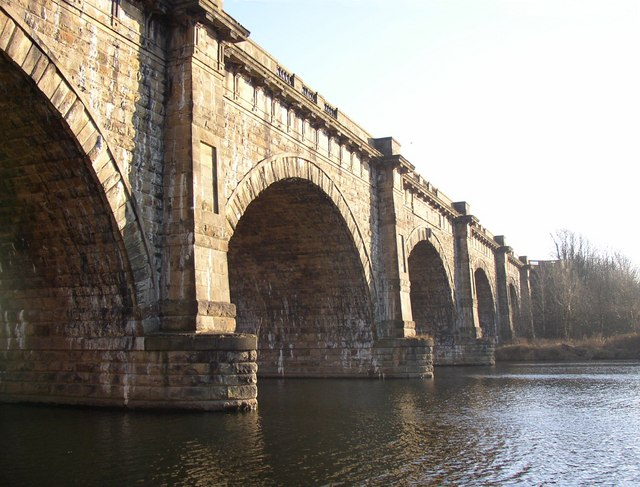
Lune Aqueduct, Quernmore

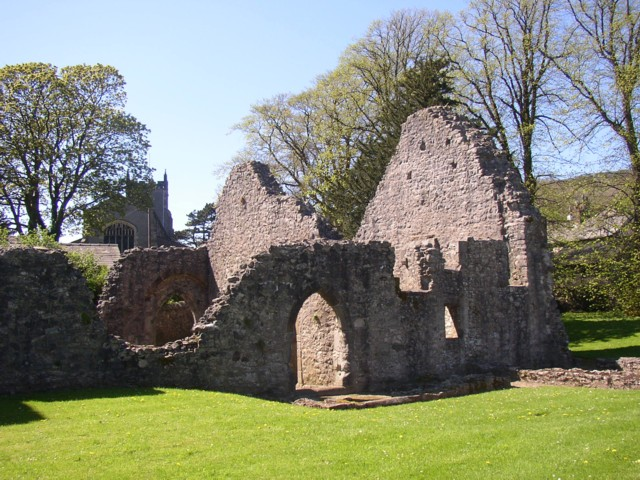
Old Rectory, Warton

- Listed buildings in Arkholme-with-Cawood
- Listed buildings in Bolton-le-Sands
- Listed buildings in Borwick
- Listed buildings in Burrow-with-Burrow
- Listed buildings in Cantsfield
- Listed buildings in Carnforth
- Listed buildings in Caton-with-Littledale
- Listed buildings in Claughton, Lancaster
- Listed buildings in Cockerham
- Listed buildings in Ellel, Lancashire
- Listed buildings in Gressingham
- Listed buildings in Halton-with-Aughton
- Listed buildings in Heaton-with-Oxcliffe
- Listed buildings in Heysham
- Listed buildings in Hornby-with-Farleton
- Listed buildings in Ireby, Lancashire
- Listed buildings in Lancaster, Lancashire
- Listed buildings in Leck, Lancashire
- Listed buildings in Melling-with-Wrayton
- Listed buildings in Middleton, Lancashire
- Listed buildings in Morecambe
- Listed buildings in Nether Kellet
- Listed buildings in Over Kellet
- Listed buildings in Over Wyresdale
- Listed buildings in Overton, Lancashire
- Listed buildings in Priest Hutton
- Listed buildings in Quernmore
- Listed buildings in Roeburndale
- Listed buildings in Scotforth
- Listed buildings in Silverdale, Lancashire
- Listed buildings in Slyne-with-Hest
- Listed buildings in Tatham, Lancashire
- Listed buildings in Thurnham, Lancashire
- Listed buildings in Tunstall, Lancashire
- Listed buildings in Warton, Lancaster
- Listed buildings in Wennington, Lancashire
- Listed buildings in Whittington, Lancashire
- Listed buildings in Wray-with-Botton
- Listed buildings in Yealand Conyers
- Listed buildings in Yealand Redmayne

=== Pendle ===
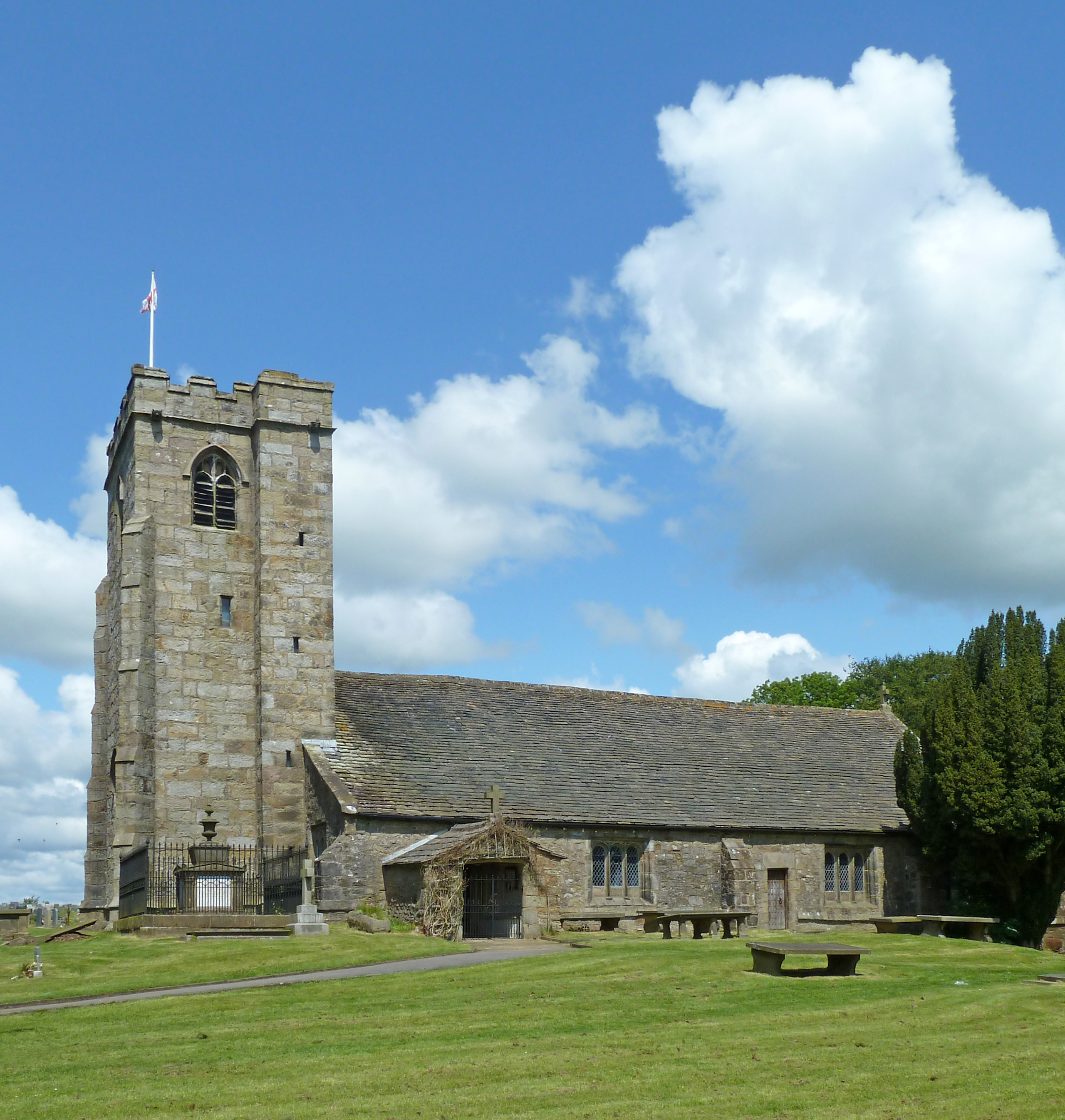
Church of St Mary le Ghyll, Barnoldswick

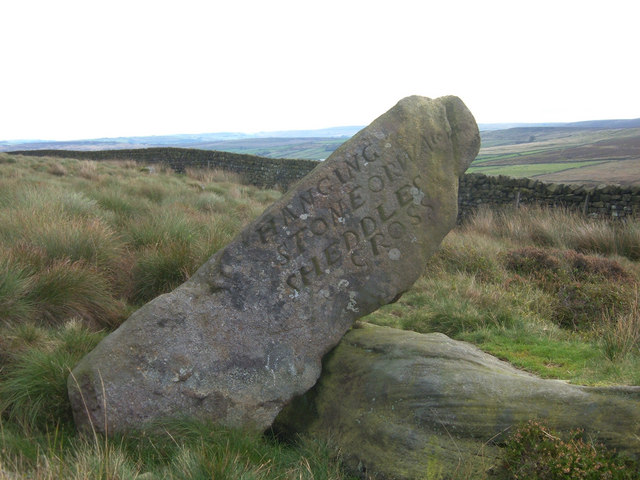
Hanging Stone, Laneshaw Bridge

- Listed buildings in Barley-with-Wheatley Booth
- Listed buildings in Barnoldswick
- Listed buildings in Barrowford
- Listed buildings in Blacko
- Listed buildings in Bracewell and Brogden
- Listed buildings in Brierfield, Lancashire
- Listed buildings in Colne
- Listed buildings in Earby
- Listed buildings in Foulridge
- Listed buildings in Goldshaw Booth
- Listed buildings in Higham with West Close Booth
- Listed buildings in Kelbrook and Sough
- Listed buildings in Laneshaw Bridge
- Listed buildings in Nelson, Lancashire
- Listed buildings in Old Laund Booth
- Listed buildings in Reedley Hallows
- Listed buildings in Roughlee Booth
- Listed buildings in Salterforth
- Listed buildings in Trawden Forest

=== Preston ===
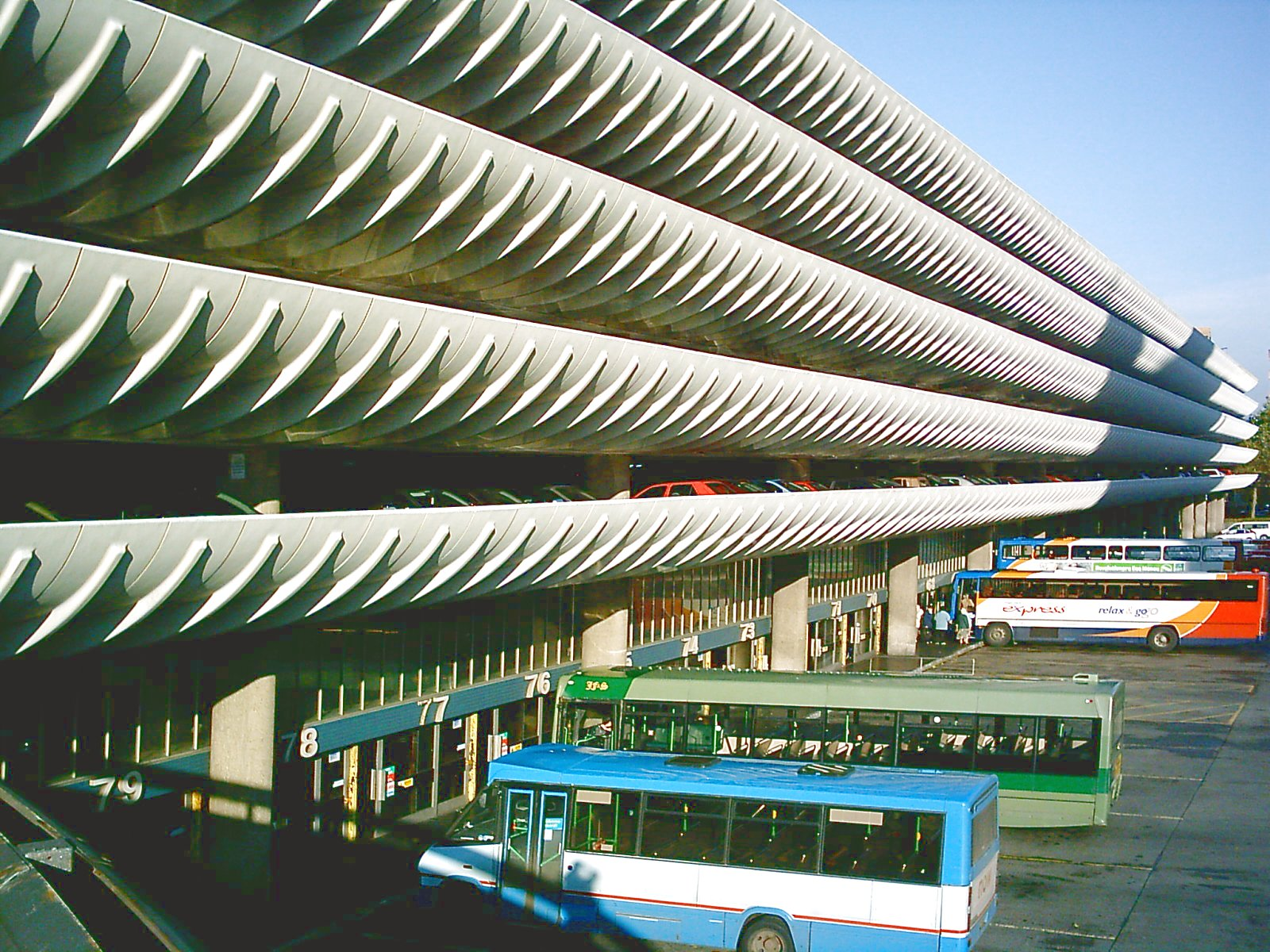
Central bus station and car park, Preston

- Listed buildings in Barton, Preston
- Listed buildings in Broughton, Lancashire
- Listed buildings in Goosnargh
- Listed buildings in Grimsargh
- Listed buildings in Haighton
- Listed buildings in Lea, Lancashire
- Listed buildings in Preston, Lancashire
- Listed buildings in Whittingham, Lancashire
- Listed buildings in Woodplumpton

=== Ribble Valley ===
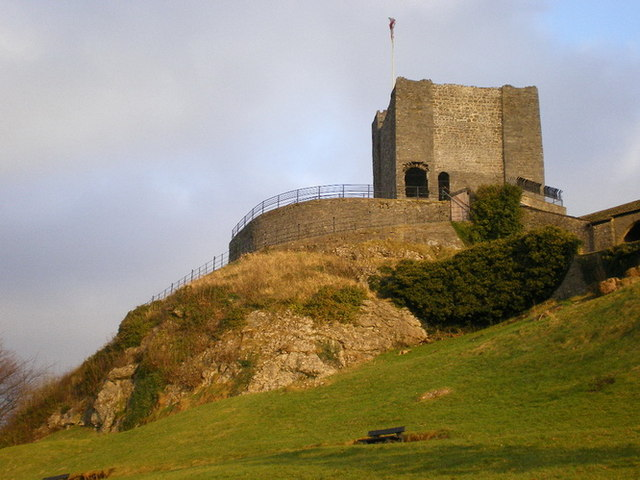
Clitheroe Castle, Clitheroe

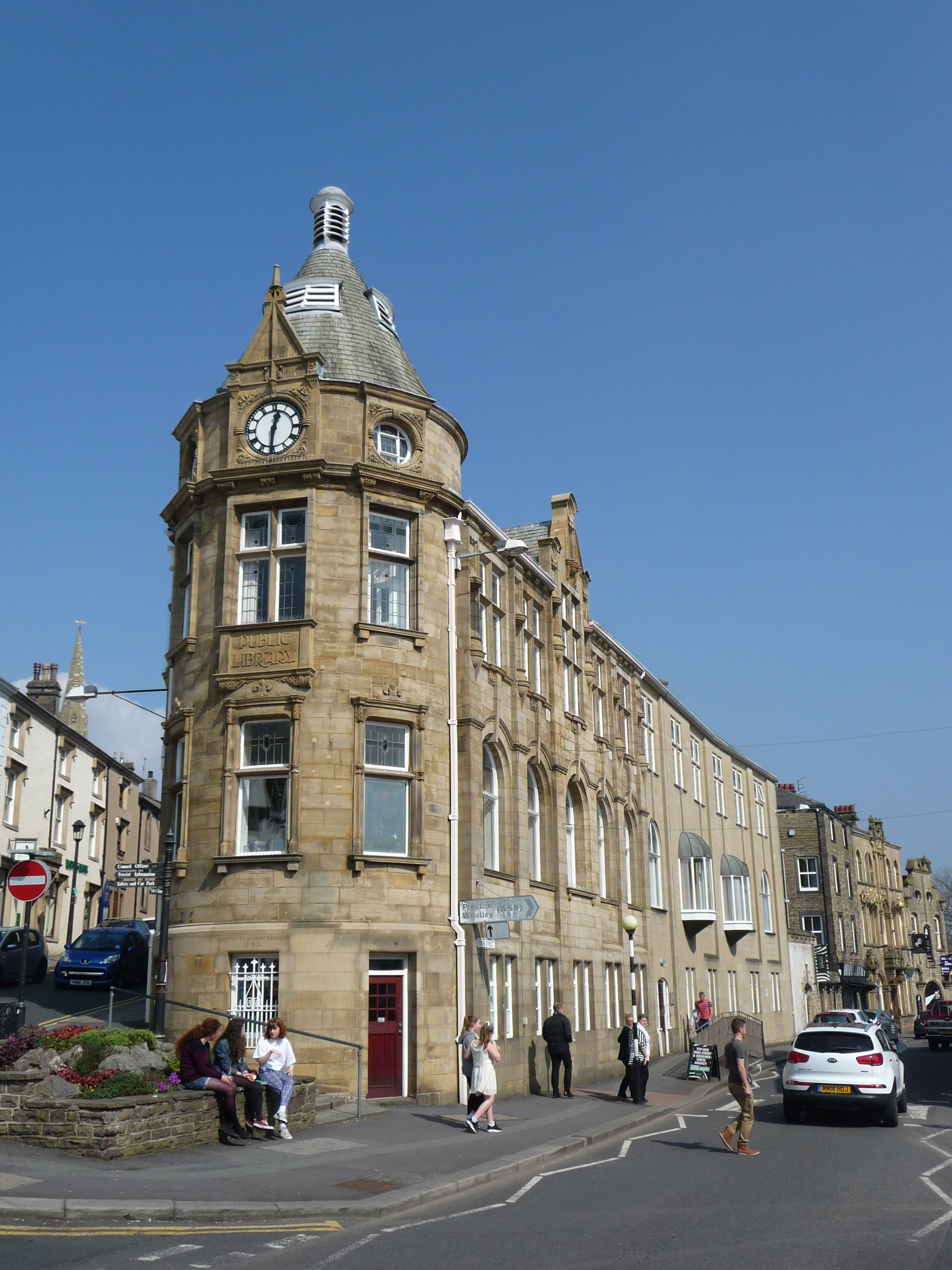
Andrew Carnegie Public Library, Clitheroe

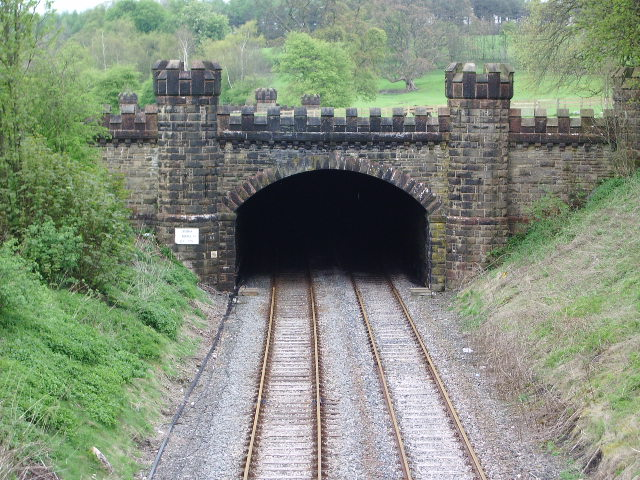
Railway tunnel, Gisburn

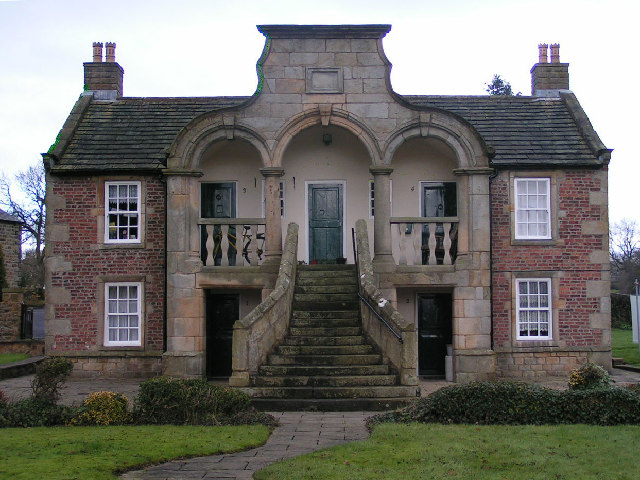
Almshouses, Ribchester

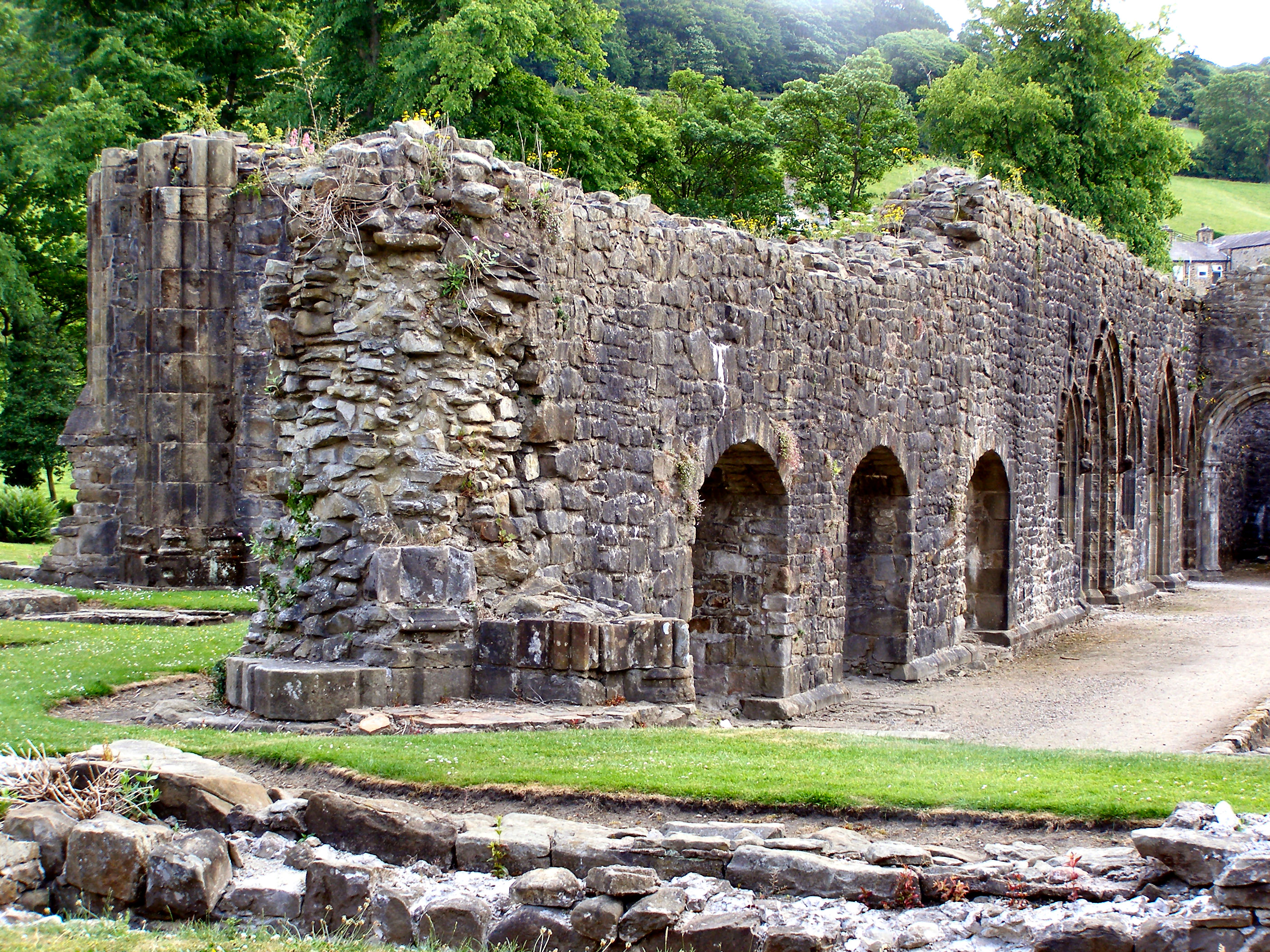
Whalley Abbey, Whalley

- Listed buildings in Aighton, Bailey and Chaigley
- Listed buildings in Balderstone, Lancashire
- Listed buildings in Bashall Eaves
- Listed buildings in Billington and Langho
- Listed buildings in Bolton-by-Bowland
- Listed buildings in Bowland Forest High
- Listed buildings in Bowland Forest Low
- Listed buildings in Bowland-with-Leagram
- Listed buildings in Chatburn
- Listed buildings in Chipping, Lancashire
- Listed buildings in Clayton-le-Dale
- Listed buildings in Clitheroe
- Listed buildings in Downham, Lancashire
- Listed buildings in Dutton, Lancashire
- Listed buildings in Easington, Lancashire
- Listed buildings in Gisburn
- Listed buildings in Gisburn Forest
- Listed buildings in Great Mitton
- Listed buildings in Grindleton
- Listed buildings in Horton, Lancashire
- Listed buildings in Hothersall
- Listed buildings in Little Mitton
- Listed buildings in Longridge
- Listed buildings in Mearley
- Listed buildings in Mellor, Lancashire
- Listed buildings in Middop
- Listed buildings in Newsholme, Lancashire
- Listed buildings in Newton, Ribble Valley
- Listed buildings in Osbaldeston
- Listed buildings in Paythorne
- Listed buildings in Pendleton, Lancashire
- Listed buildings in Read, Lancashire
- Listed buildings in Ribchester
- Listed buildings in Rimington
- Listed buildings in Sabden
- Listed buildings in Salesbury
- Listed buildings in Sawley, Lancashire
- Listed buildings in Simonstone, Lancashire
- Listed buildings in Slaidburn
- Listed buildings in Thornley-with-Wheatley
- Listed buildings in Twiston
- Listed buildings in Waddington, Lancashire
- Listed buildings in West Bradford, Lancashire
- Listed buildings in Whalley, Lancashire
- Listed buildings in Wiswell
- Listed buildings in Worston

=== Rossendale ===
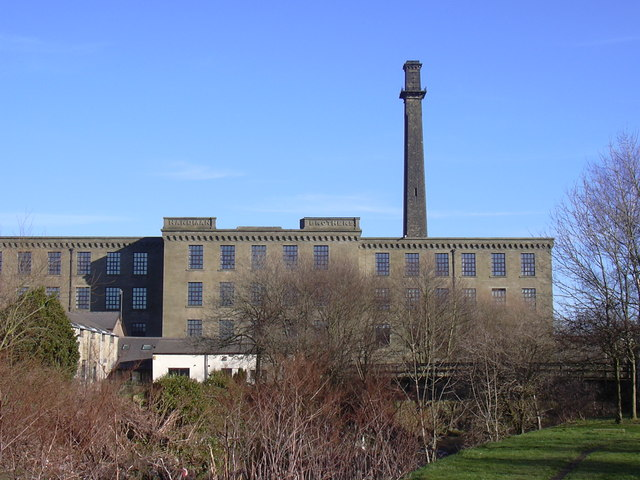
Hardman's Mill, Rawtenstall

- Listed buildings in Bacup
- Listed buildings in Haslingden
- Listed buildings in Rawtenstall
- Listed buildings in Whitworth, Lancashire

=== South Ribble ===
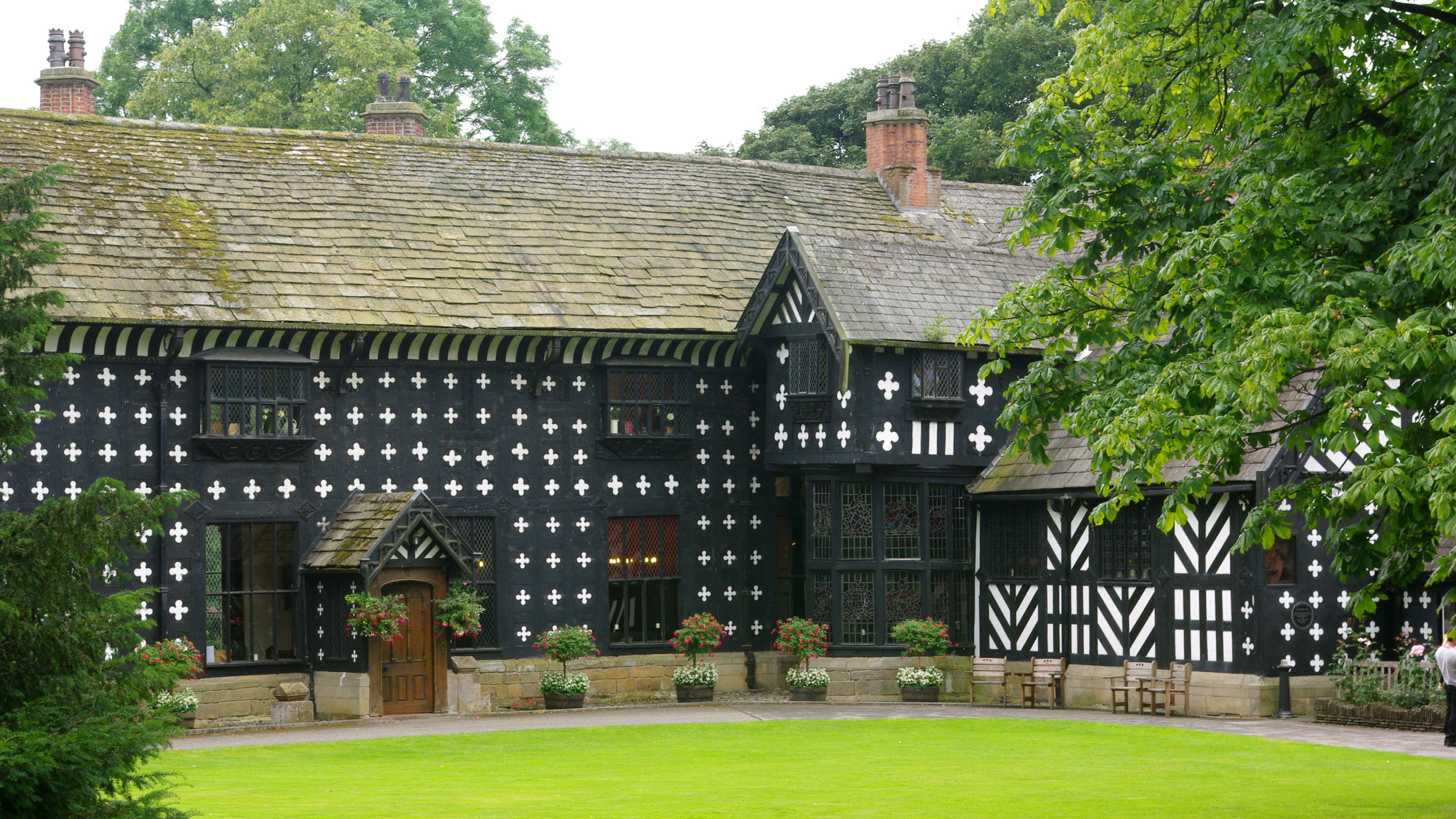
Samlesbury Hall, Samlesbury

- Listed buildings in Cuerdale
- Listed buildings in Farington
- Listed buildings in Hutton, Lancashire
- Listed buildings in Leyland, Lancashire
- Listed buildings in Little Hoole
- Listed buildings in Longton, Lancashire
- Listed buildings in Much Hoole
- Listed buildings in Penwortham
- Listed buildings in Samlesbury
- Listed buildings in Walton-le-Dale

=== West Lancashire ===
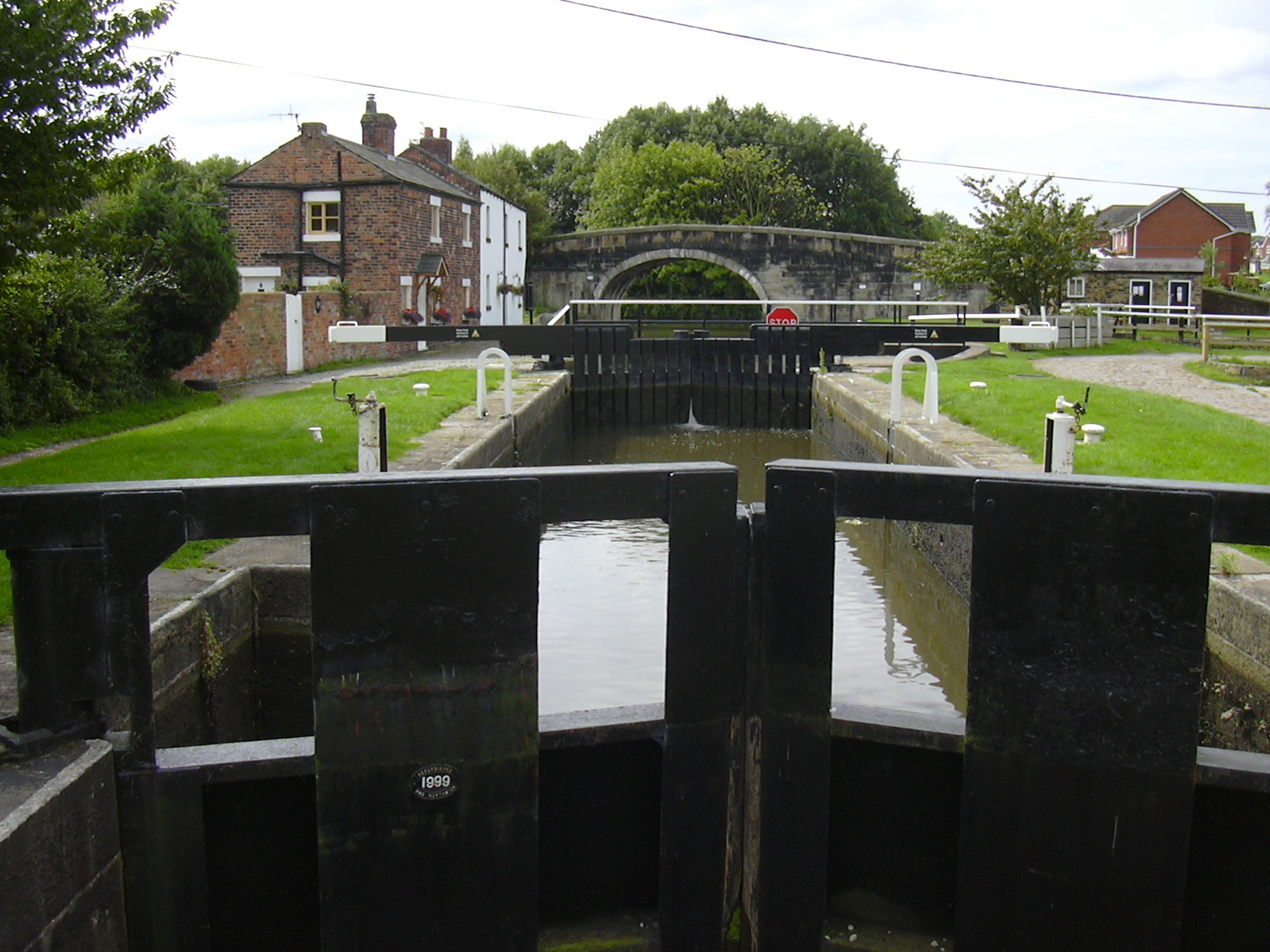
Top Locks (upper lock), Burscough and Lathom

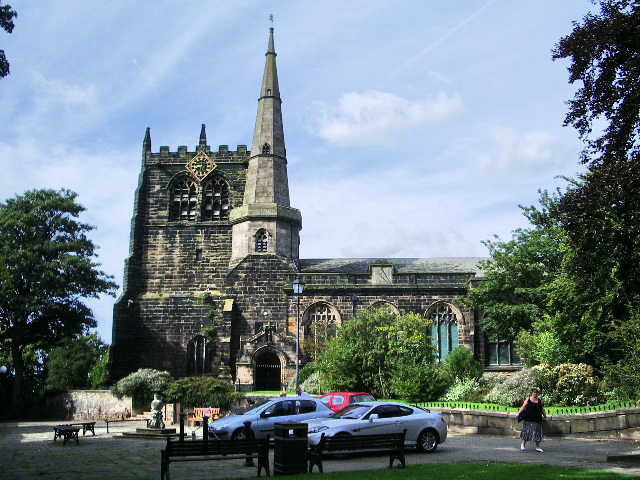
Church of St Peter and St Paul, Ormskirk

- Listed buildings in Aughton, Lancashire
- Listed buildings in Bickerstaffe
- Listed buildings in Bispham, West Lancashire
- Listed buildings in Burscough
- Listed buildings in Dalton, Lancashire
- Listed buildings in Downholland
- Listed buildings in Great Altcar
- Listed buildings in Halsall
- Listed buildings in Hesketh-with-Becconsall
- Listed buildings in Hilldale
- Listed buildings in Lathom
- Listed buildings in Lathom South
- Listed buildings in Newburgh, Lancashire
- Listed buildings in Ormskirk
- Listed buildings in Parbold
- Listed buildings in Rufford, Lancashire
- Listed buildings in Scarisbrick
- Listed buildings in Skelmersdale
- Listed buildings in Tarleton
- Listed buildings in Upholland
- Listed buildings in Wrightington

=== Wyre ===
- Listed buildings in Barnacre-with-Bonds
- Listed buildings in Bleasdale
- Listed buildings in Cabus
- Listed buildings in Catterall
- Listed buildings in Claughton, Wyre
- Listed buildings in Fleetwood
- Listed buildings in Forton, Lancashire
- Listed buildings in Garstang
- Listed buildings in Great Eccleston
- Listed buildings in Hambleton, Lancashire
- Listed buildings in Inskip-with-Sowerby
- Listed buildings in Kirkland, Lancashire
- Listed buildings in Myerscough and Bilsborrow
- Listed buildings in Nateby, Lancashire
- Listed buildings in Nether Wyresdale
- Listed buildings in Out Rawcliffe
- Listed buildings in Pilling
- Listed buildings in Poulton-le-Fylde
- Listed buildings in Preesall
- Listed buildings in Stalmine-with-Staynall
- Listed buildings in Thornton-Cleveleys
- Listed buildings in Upper Rawcliffe-with-Tarnacre
- Listed buildings in Winmarleigh

== Former listed buildings ==
- Greaves Hall, North Meols (demolished 2009)
