= Salesbury =

Village in Lancashire, England

Coordinates: 53.797°N 2.489°W

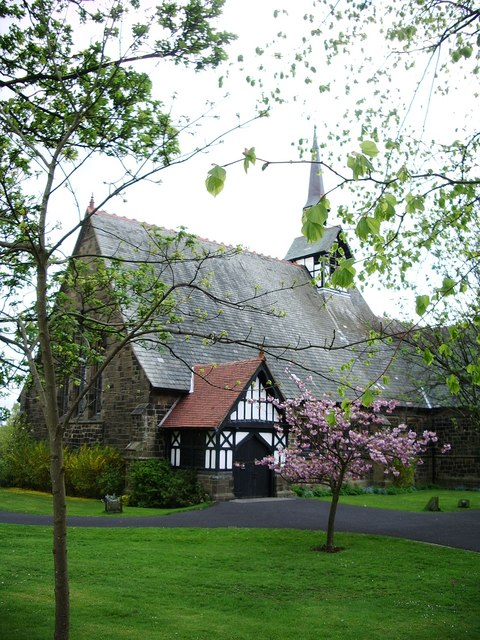
- St. Peter's Church

- Shown within Ribble Valley Location within Lancashire
- Population: 403 (Parish 2011)
- OS grid reference: SD677335
- Civil parish: Salesbury
- District: Ribble Valley
- Shire county: Lancashire
- Region: North West
- Country: England
- Sovereign state: United Kingdom
- Post town: Blackburn
- Postcode district: BB1
- Dialling code: 01254
- Police: Lancashire
- Fire: Lancashire
- Ambulance: North West

Salesbury is a village and civil parish in Ribble Valley, located centrally in the county of Lancashire, England. The B6245 road runs straight through the village providing transport links to towns such as Blackburn, Preston and Burnley. Salesbury lies less than 5 miles north of Blackburn and approximately 2 miles south of the River Ribble.

Copster Green is an area of houses a little north of Salesbury.

== History ==
Salesbury is first recorded as a chapelry in the ancient parish of Blackburn but in 1866 it became a civil parish. The Old English name of the village is 'Salebyry', dating from 1246 AD and 'Salewelle' dating from 1296 AD. This means 'burh by Sale Wheel' (burh is an Old English word meaning fortress). Sale Wheel is the name of a pool in the River Ribble where the river winds, contracts and foams over huge rocks and boulders within the channel and means "pool where willows grow". Wheel comes from the Anglo-Saxon word "weal" meaning a whirlpool.

== The church ==
Initially there was no church in Salesbury, so devout landowners of the village often had private chapels. It is known that Salesbury Old Hall and Showley Hall are two of the places that housed chapels. These could be attended by tenants and servants, but for baptisms, marriages and burials people went to nearby churches in Blackburn and Ribchester. These were the Parish Church of St. Mary in Blackburn and St Wilfrid's Church, Ribchester.

As the population of Salesbury grew towards the end of the 18th Century as a result in a boom in weaving, Viscount Bulkeley and other landowners raised the money to build a Chapelry. St. Peter's Chapelry was built and consisted of a rectangular room with a bell, a chimney and a porch. It was consecrated on 8 September 1807 by the Lord Bishop of Chester. The Chapelry served its purpose for many years until 1848, when a report by the Rural Dean of Blackburn described the old church as 'having been originally very ill-built, and, in its present condition, inconvenient, uncouth, unchurchlike and ruinous.'. The building was propped up, and church life went on as usual.

In 1873 a new vicar Rev. Peter Hopwood Hart arrived and set up a committee to raise money for a new church. The old chapelry was removed and a church was re-built in the same position. The church was finally consecrated on 29 June 1887. It was known as the Jubilee Church as it was built in the year of the Golden Jubilee of Queen Victoria. It was built in a 'late 14th-century Gothic' design by the architects Stones & Gradwell.

The church is one of the main features in Salesbury. It boasts stained glass windows, an organ and a regular choir. The church has a graveyard which surrounds the church and includes spaces for both gravestones and cremation plaques. The current incumbent is the Reverend Elizabeth M. McLean.

== Population ==
=== 1881–1961 census ===
Salesbury Total Population 1881–1961

The population of Salesbury has fluctuated throughout time. The 1881 census records the population to be 184 people. This was spread over 1,150 acres of land and there were thought to be 58 houses. The chapelry was so small that the residents post was sent to the local town of Blackburn where it needed to be collected. As time went on the population reached a peak in the 1930s at 350 people and begun to plateau at around an average population of 300 around 1950. This did not follow the general trend of the UK as the 1930s mostly saw a low rate of population increase. Similarly as World War II ended and marriages boomed the population also increased in to peak in the 1960s. This can be seen to a small extent on the graph but there was not a significant population change in Salesbury.

=== 2001–2011 census ===
Much of the modern village of Salesbury lies within Clayton-le-Dale parish, the main centre of population in Salesbury being Copster Green. At the 2001 UK census, the parish had a population of 391, with 1,142 in Clayton-le-Dale, whereas the 2011 UK census recorded populations of 403 and 1,128 respectively. Clayton-le-Dale is situated further down the same road and is approximately the same size if a little bigger than Salesbury, so it could be interpreted that by halving the figure a rough estimate of the population could be achieved. In the same area there were 624 houses recorded which by the same logic still shows a significant increase from the early figures of 58 houses. This increase could be due to the people who are tempted away from big towns and cities as a result of the 'rural idyll'

== Employment ==
=== 1881 census ===
In the census carried out in 1881 55% of men were employed either in agriculture (29%) or working with mineral substances (26%). These high levels of manual labour are typical of the time. At the other end of the scale the least popular forms of employment were as professionals (2%), as workers in food and lodging (3%) or in transport and communication (3%). As it could be expected the majority of women worked in domestic services or offices (22%) or in textiles and fabrics (22%). Many women were employed by the weaving trade, this was also responsible for a boom in the population towards the end of the 18th century as the craft became more popular.

=== 2001 census ===
The United Kingdom Census 2001 shows a change in the types on employment in the village. The two main forms of employment are manufacturing (17%) and wholesale and retail trade (18%). It is clear that manufacturing can still be seen as a form of manual labour suggesting little change. But the increase in employment in retail and trade follows with the retail trends of the 21st century. In contrast, previously popular employment such as Fishing, Mining and quarrying all currently employ no one in the village. This shows a shift from primary employment to secondary and tertiary forms of employment.

== Amenities ==
There are few local amenities in the village of Salesbury as the small size of the settlement and the proximity to Blackburn means that residents can easily access services elsewhere. The village's amenities include; a public house, a memorial hall, a primary school, a cricket club and of course the church.

=== The Bonny Inn ===
The Bonny Inn pub is situated in the southern part of the village on Ribchester road. It is described as a 'traditional family pub' according to The Good Pub Guide.

=== The Memorial Hall ===
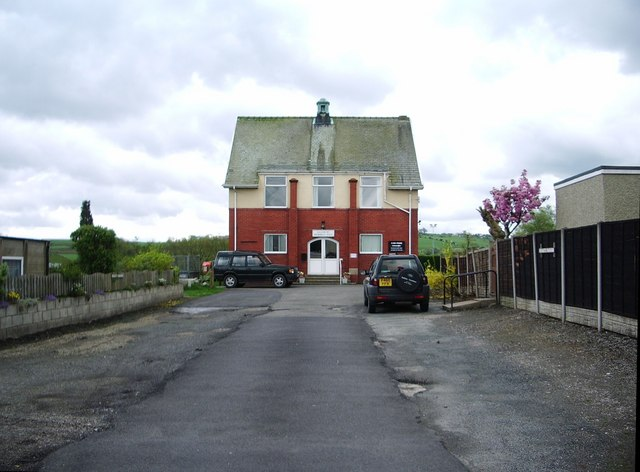
Salesbury Memorial Hall

Salesbury Memorial Hall is located on Ribchester Road in Salesbury. It is intended for the use of the inhabitants of the village, This includes meetings, classes and leisure activities. Last years income was £13,552 whilst the expenditure was £10,941 leaving a profit of £2.611 for the hall. The grounds surrounding and near to the Memorial Hall belong to the Wilpshire Wanderers under 5 to under 10 football teams. The ground opened in 2002 by former Blackburn and England favourite Ronnie Clayton (footballer). Ronnie was also the Honorary President of Wilpshire Wanderers Football Club until he died in 2010.

=== Salesbury School ===
Salesbury school is a mixed primary school which caters for children from ages 3–11. The school has 9 classes in total not including the nursery, this adds up to a total of 275 full-time pupils and 45 part-time pupils.

=== Salesbury Cricket Club ===
The cricket club (Salesbury CC) was founded in 1906, and the team initially played in the Blackburn Sunday school league. It boasts both junior and adult sections. The junior section consists of U9, U11, U13, U15 and U18 teams, and is credited with E.C.B. Clubmark Status, This shows the high quality and standard of the club. There are three adult teams, 1st, 2nd and 3rd's.

== See also ==
- Listed buildings in Salesbury
