= Nateby, Lancashire =

Village in Lancashire, England

Coordinates: 53.896°N 2.817°W

Nateby
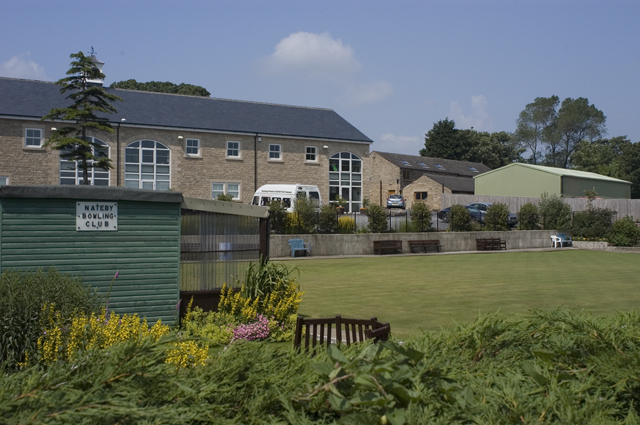
- Nateby Bowling Club

- Shown within Wyre Borough Shown on the Fylde Location within Lancashire
- Population: 524 (2021)
- OS grid reference: SD463447
- Civil parish: Nateby
- District: Wyre
- Shire county: Lancashire
- Region: North West
- Country: England
- Sovereign state: United Kingdom
- Post town: PRESTON
- Postcode district: PR3
- Dialling code: 01995
- Police: Lancashire
- Fire: Lancashire
- Ambulance: North West
- UK Parliament: Lancaster and Wyre

Nateby is a village and a civil parish in the Wyre district, in the English county of Lancashire near the town of Garstang. Nateby has a primary school, and a place of worship. It once had a railway station called Nateby railway station, but this closed on 31 March 1930, and the post office closed on 27 November 2000. In 2001 the parish had a population of 475, increasing to 584 at the 2011 census. However, it decreased in the 2021 census to 524.

The manor belongs to the executors of the late R. Thompson, Esq. The admiral and MP Roger Strickland was the second son of Walter Strickland of Nateby Hall.

== See also ==
- Listed buildings in Nateby, Lancashire
