= Osbaldeston =

Village and civil parish in Lancashire, England

Coordinates: 53°46′55″N 2°32′17″W

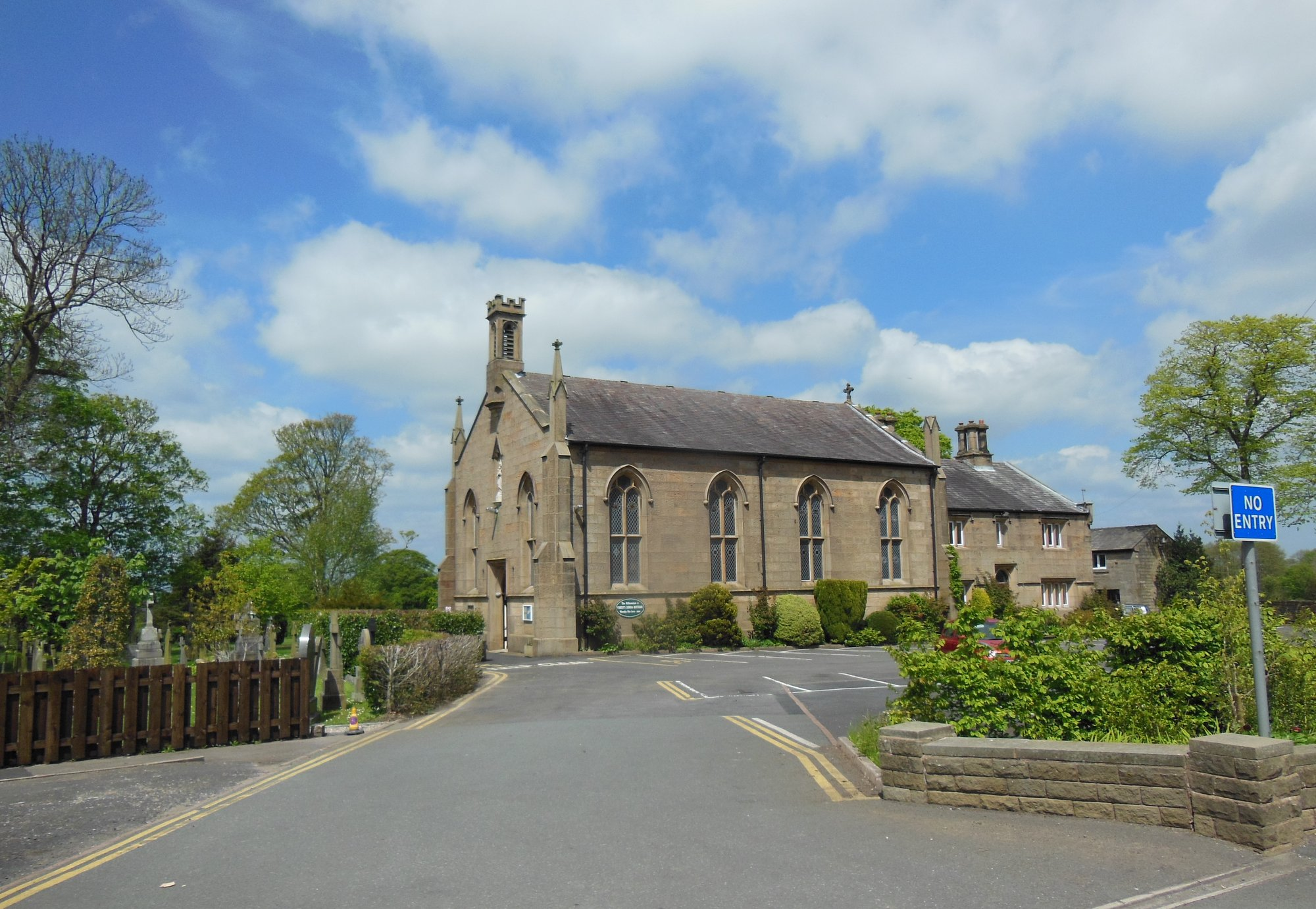
- St Mary's Church

- Shown within Ribble County park Location within Lancashire
- Population: 185 (2011)
- OS grid reference: SD644324
- Civil parish: Osbaldeston
- District: Ribble Valley
- Shire county: Lancashire
- Region: North West
- Country: England
- Sovereign state: United Kingdom
- Post town: BLACKBURN
- Postcode district: BB2
- Dialling code: 01254
- Police: Lancashire
- Fire: Lancashire
- Ambulance: North West
- UK Parliament: Ribble Valley

Osbaldeston is a village and civil parish in Lancashire, England, about 3 1/4 miles (5.2 km) north-west of Blackburn and 7 miles (11.3 km) east of Preston. The population of the civil parish as taken at the 2011 census was 185.

Osbaldeston is on the A59 road and lies on the south bank of the River Ribble opposite Ribchester. The parish has an area of 1,084 acres (1.7 sq mi), and the land rises from 70 feet (21 m) above sea level, by the banks of the river, to 360 ft (110 m) to the south-east. There is no Anglican place of worship, but the Roman Catholic Church of St Mary (built in 1837–38) is at grid reference SD648318 on Longsight Road and is Perpendicular in style. The hamlet of Osbaldeston Green lies due north of the village. There is record of a Roman road in the area.

Osbaldeston Hall, which lies beside the Ribble, is a Grade II* listed building dating from about 1600, constructed with crucks. It is associated with the Catholic martyr Edward Osbaldeston. Oxendale Hall is a building of 1656, with a gabled façade. The hall has two storeys, and most of the house has a Snecked masonry façade from a 1946 restoration. This was performed after a long period of time when many parts of the hall, which was used as a farmhouse, fell into dilapidation. Much of the inside of the house, including the 'banqueting hall', has visible timber framing.

== See also ==
- Grade II* listed buildings in Lancashire
- Listed buildings in Osbaldeston
