= Cabus =

Village and civil parish in Lancashire, England

Coordinates: 53.919°N 2.777°W

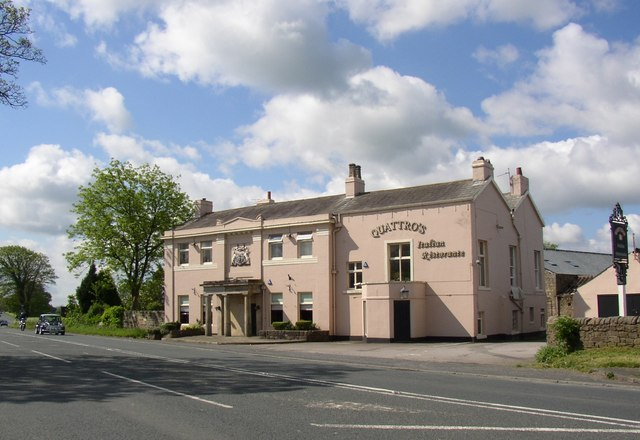
- The Hamilton Arms, on the A6, Cabus

- Shown within Wyre Borough Location within Lancashire
- Population: 1,665 (2021)
- OS grid reference: SD489472
- Civil parish: Cabus
- District: Wyre
- Shire county: Lancashire
- Region: North West
- Country: England
- Sovereign state: United Kingdom
- Post town: Preston
- Postcode district: PR3
- Dialling code: 01995
- Police: Lancashire
- Fire: Lancashire
- Ambulance: North West
- UK Parliament: Lancaster and Wyre

Cabus is a village and civil parish in Lancashire, England. It is 12 miles north of Preston, 9 miles south of Lancaster and 16 miles northeast of Blackpool.

The electoral ward of Cabus, which includes some northern suburbs of Garstang and a rural area surrounding the village, had a population of 1,573 in 2001 and lies in the Wyre district. The population of the parish was 1,665 according to the 2021 Census.

== Transport ==
Three bus routes serve the village:

40/41 - Preston or Lancaster/Morecambe

42 - Blackpool or Lancaster

All of these routes are run by Stagecoach.

== See also ==
- Listed buildings in Cabus
