= St John the Baptist's Church, Bretherton =

Coordinates: 53.6777°N 2.7951°W

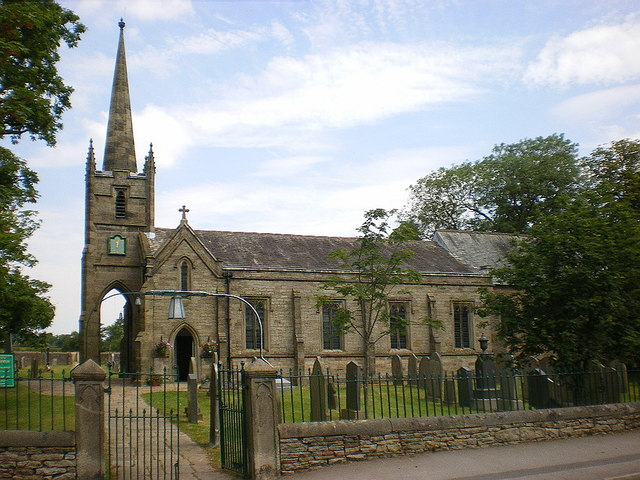
- The church from the south

- Location in the Borough of Chorley
- OS grid reference: SD 476,204
- Location: Bretherton, Lancashire
- Country: England
- Denomination: Anglican
- Website: St John the Baptist, Bretherton

History
- Status: Parish church
- Founded: 1839
- Dedication: St John the Baptist
- Consecrated: July 1840

Architecture
- Functional status: Active
- Heritage designation: Grade II
- Designated: 30 January 1987
- Architect(s): Edmund Sharpe; Austin and Paley
- Architectural type: Church
- Style: Gothic Revival
- Groundbreaking: 1839
- Completed: 1909
- Construction cost: £1,058 (£90,000 in 2025)

Specifications
- Materials: Sandstone, slate roofs

Administration
- Province: York
- Diocese: Blackburn
- Archdeaconry: Blackburn
- Deanery: Chorley
- Parish: Bretherton

Clergy
- Rector: Revd D. J. Reynolds

St John the Baptist's Church is in the village of Bretherton, Lancashire, England. It is an active Anglican parish church in the deanery of Chorley, the archdeaconry of Blackburn and the diocese of Blackburn. Its benefice is united with that of St Michael and All Angels, Croston. The church is recorded in the National Heritage List for England as a designated Grade II listed building. It was a Commissioners' church, having received a grant towards its construction from the Church Building Commission.

== History ==
St John's was a Commissioners' church costing £1,058 (equivalent to £90,000 in 2025). The Church Building Commission contributed £250 towards its cost. It was designed by the Lancaster architect Edmund Sharpe and built in 1839–40. The land was given by George Anthony Legh Keck. The church provided seating for 400 people. In July 1840 it was consecrated by Rt Revd John Bird Sumner, at that time the Bishop of Chester. The church was restored in 1898 by Sharpe's successors Austin and Paley, who also added a chancel and vestry in 1908–09. In September 2009 the church was damaged by fire caused by an arsonist.

== Architecture ==
The church is constructed in sandstone with slate roofs. Its plan consists of a five-bay nave incorporating a south porch, and a two-bay chancel under a higher roof. The style of the nave is "simple Gothic", while that of the chancel is Perpendicular. At the west end is a slender tower, the lowest stage of which constitutes a porch that is open on three sides. Above this are three string courses, the top one of which is stepped over the bell opening. At the corners are buttresses that rise to form crocketted pinnacles. At the top of the tower between the pinnacles is a stepped parapet. A slim octagonal spire rises from the tower. The porch has an arched doorway over which is a lancet window. Its top is gabled and has a cross finial. The east window has five lights and Perpendicular tracery. Inside the church is a west gallery supported on four slim iron columns. The two-manual organ was built by Ainscough Organ Builders of Preston in 1929, and rebuilt and extended by David Wells of Liverpool in 2000.

== External features ==
The churchyard contains the war grave of a Loyal Regiment soldier of World War I.

The graves of Sir Harcourt Clare and his family are in the church yard.

== See also ==
- Listed buildings in Bretherton
- List of architectural works by Edmund Sharpe
- List of ecclesiastical works by Austin and Paley (1895–1914)
- List of Commissioners' churches in Northeast and Northwest England

== Gallery ==
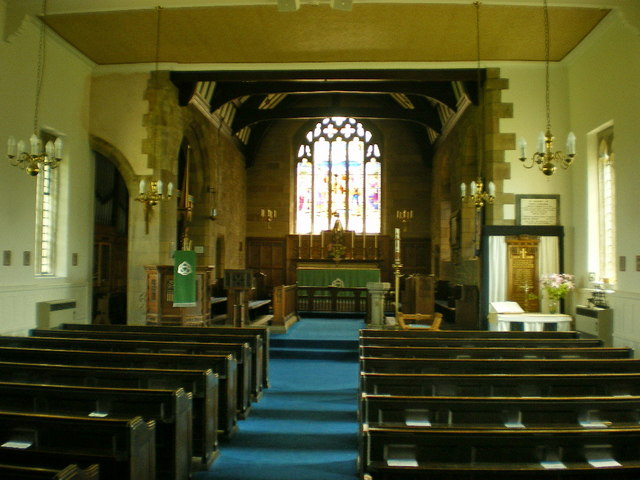
Interior – view towards altar

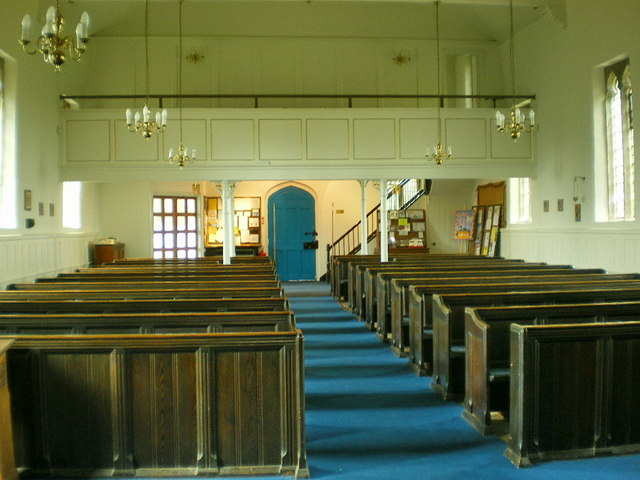
Interior – view towards rear

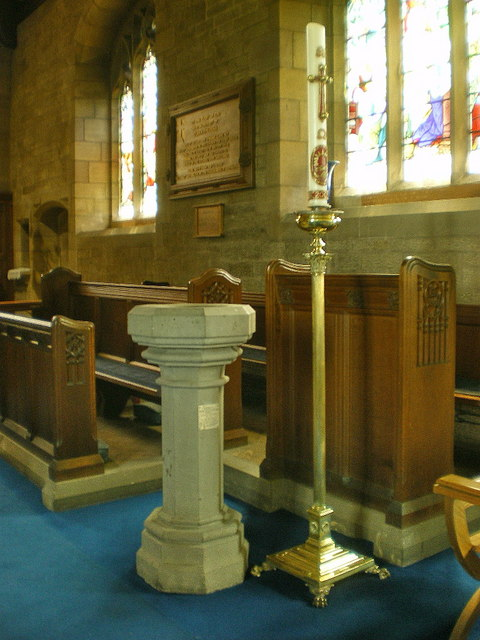
The font

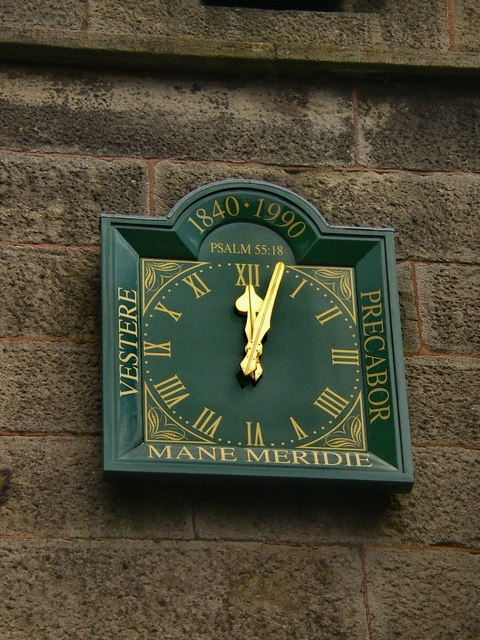
Clock

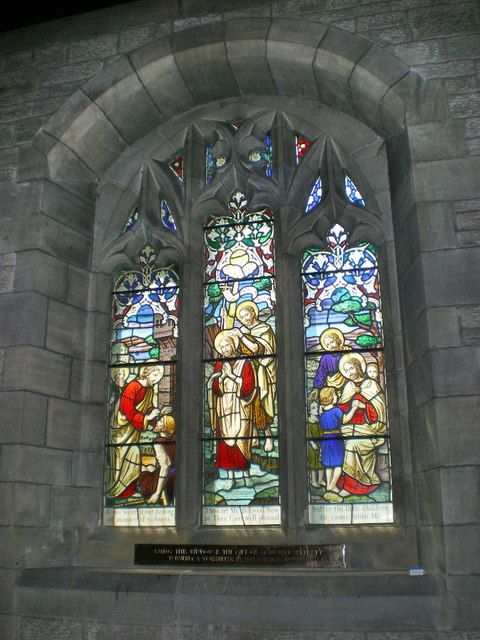
Stained glass window

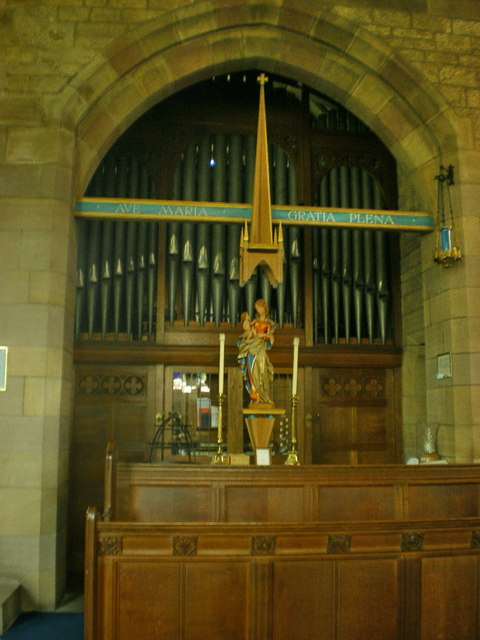
The organ

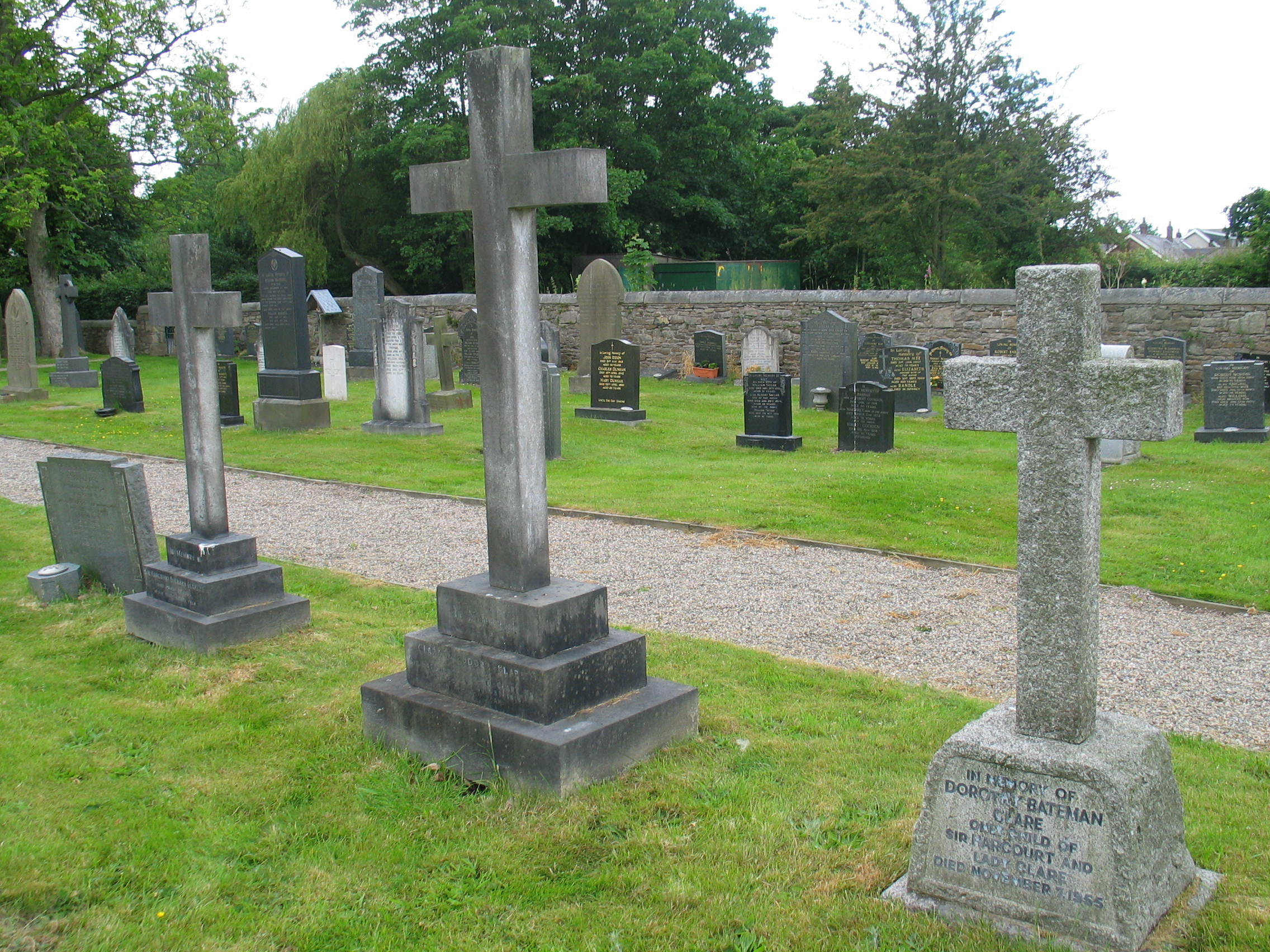
The three crosses of the Clare family graves
