= Listed buildings in Much Hoole =

Much Hoole is a civil parish in the South Ribble district of Lancashire, England. It contains eight buildings that are recorded in the National Heritage List for England as designated listed buildings. Of these, one is listed at Grade II*, the middle grade, and the others are at Grade II, the lowest grade. The parish contains the village of Much Hoole, and is otherwise rural. Most of the listed buildings are houses or farmhouses, the others being a church and a milestone.

== Key ==
Grade	Criteria
II*	Particularly important buildings of more than special interest
II	Buildings of national importance and special interest

== Buildings ==
Name and location	Photograph	Date	Notes	Grade
St Michael's Church; 53.69455°N 2.81483°W		1628	The oldest parts of the church are the body and the porch, the tower being added probably in 1719–22. The chancel dates from 1824 and it was remodelled in 1858 as a memorial to Jeremiah Horrocks. A southeast vestry was added in 1998–99. The tower is in ashlar, and the rest of the church is in brick with diapering, standing on a stone plinth and with a slate roof. Along the sides of the nave are mullioned windows. The tower is in two stages, and has rusticated quoins, round-headed bell openings, an embattled parapet with pinnacles and, on the south side, a painted sundial dated 1825. In the nave roof are dormers, and inside the church are galleries on the south and west sides.	II*
Church Farmhouse; 53.69511°N 2.81484°W	—	17th century	The farmhouse was extended later in the century and altered in the following century. It is in brick, with diapering and stone quoins, and has a roof partly of slate and partly of stone-slate. There are two storeys and the house has an L-shaped plan with a 1 1/2-bay hall and a two-bay cross wing. The windows are 19th-century casements. Inside the house are an inglenook and a bressumer, and in the upper floor is a timber-framed partition.	II
Mill Hill Farmhouse; 53.69041°N 2.81996°W	—	Late 17th century (probable)	The farmhouse is in brick with a slate roof, and has two storeys and three bays. The windows in the ground floor are casements with segmental heads, and in the upper floor they are sliding sashes. Inside the house is an inglenook and a large bressumer.	II
Mill Hill Cottage; 53.69037°N 2.82072°W		1691	The house was extended in the middle of the 19th century, with an additional bay added to the right. It is in brick with stone quoins and a slate roof. The house has two storeys and three bays. The doorway is in the third bay, and in the second bay is a blocked doorway with an inscribed lintel. The windows are casements with segmental heads. In the rear wall and the left gable wall are blocked windows with mullions and hood moulds. Inside the house is an inglenook and a bressumer.	II
Churchills; 53.69490°N 2.81499°W	—	18th century or earlier	Originally a barn, later converted for domestic use, it is in brick with some stone quoins and a slate roof. It has two storeys and four bays, and contains a wagon doorway with a segmental head, a doorway, and windows.	II
Manor House Farmhouse; 53.69485°N 2.80053°W	—	Mid 18th century (probable)	A brick house with stone dressings and a slate roof, in two storeys with an attic. It has a symmetrical front with a central single-storey gabled porch. The windows on the front are sashes with splayed stone heads. At the rear is a tall stair window.	II
Manor House Farmhouse; 53.70018°N 2.78675°W	—	Mid 18th century	The farmhouse is in brick with a slate roof, and has two storeys with an attic, and three bays. The doorway is offset to the right, and the windows on the front are casements. At the rear are similar windows and a stairlight, and the attic window in the right gable is a sliding sash.	II
Milestone; 53.70045°N 2.80240°W	—	Late 18th century	The milestone was re-erected on its present site in the middle of the 20th century, and originally stood on the Preston to Liverpool turnpike road. It is a rectangular stone post containing an inset inscribed panel giving the distances in miles to Liverpool, Ormskirk, and Preston.	II
