= Listed buildings in Bretherton =

Bretherton is a civil parish in the Borough of Chorley, Lancashire, England. The parish contains 19 buildings that are recorded in the National Heritage List for England as designated listed buildings. Of these, two are listed at Grade II*, the middle grade, and the others are at Grade II, the lowest grade. Apart from the village of Bretherton, the parish is rural. Most of the listed buildings are, or originated as, farmhouses or farm buildings. The other listed buildings include a medieval cross base, two historic houses, a cottages, a former school a converted windmill, a church, a rectory, and a war memorial

== Key ==
Grade	Criteria
II*	Particularly important buildings of more than special interest
II	Buildings of national importance and special interest

== Buildings ==
Name and location	Photograph	Date	Notes	Grade
Cross base 53.67728°N 2.79412°W	—	Medieval (probable)	The stone base of a former cross, about 1 metre (3 ft 3 in) high, square and with tapered sides. In the upper surface is a filled-in circular recess.	II
Bank Hall; 53.67558°N 2.81511°W		1608	A Jacobean mansion that was extended later in the 16th century, and altered, restored and extended in 1832–33, probably by George Webster. By the late 20th century the building had become derelict. It is built in red brick with diapering, and has stone dressings and slate roofs. The house is mainly in 2 1/2 storeys, its most prominent feature being the square tower, which contains mullioned and transomed windows, and a clock face, and has an ornamental parapet. Features in the other remaining parts include Dutch gables, and chimney stacks with clustered diagonal flues.	II*
Carr House; 53.68696°N 2.81505°W		1613	A house in red brick with blue brick diapering, stone dressings, and a slate roof that was remodelled in the 20th century. It has 2 1/2 storeys, is in an E-shaped plan, and has a symmetrical five-bay front. The outer bays project slightly forward, and in the centre is a three-storey porch. Above the doorway in the porch is a large inscribed lintel. The windows are mullioned. Inside the house is a cruck roof, an inglenook fireplace, and a timber bressumer.	II*
Blackamoor Hall; 53.67726°N 2.79849°W	—	Early 17th century (probable)	Originally a farmhouse, it is in brick with some diapering, stone quoins, and a slate roof. The house has two storeys and is in a T-shaped plan with a two bay range and a two-bay cross-wing. All the openings have been altered.	II
Iron Barn Farmhouse; 53.67778°N 2.78950°W	—	Early 17th century	A brick farmhouse on a sandstone plinth with a stone-slate roof at the front, and a slate roof at the rear. It has two storeys and three bays, with additions to the front and rear of the first bay. On the front is a gabled porch and sliding sash windows, and at the rear all the windows have been altered.	II
Farm building, Bank Hall; 53.67673°N 2.81603°W	—	17th century	A multi-purpose farm building in brick with stone quoins and a stone-slate roof. It has a rectangular plan, and is about 75 metres (246 ft) long. The building contains windows, stable doors, a wagon doorway, ventilation slits, and loading doors.	II
Smithy Cottage; 53.68212°N 2.79218°W	—	17th century (probable)	A cruck-framed cottage with brick cladding on a rendered plinth and with a corrugated sheet roof, It is in 1 1/2 storeys, and has a three-bay front. On the front is a modern gabled porch, and the windows are casements. On the rear is a sliding sash window.	II
152 and 154 South Road; 53.67752°N 2.79412°W	—	1653	Originally a school, later converted into two houses, it is in roughcast brick with a slate roof, and has a rectangular plan. There are two storeys and a three-bay front. On the front is a gabled porch, with an inscribed lintel above the doorway. The windows are 19th-century sashes.	II
Holly Farmhouse; 53.67694°N 2.79617°W	—	Late 16th century (probable)	Originally a farmhouse, it is in brick with a stone-slate roof. The house has two storeys and three bays, and contains sliding sash windows. In the right gable are external steps leading to a former loft. Inside the building is an inglenook.	II
White House Farmhouse; 53.68200°N 2.79665°W	—	1680	The farmhouse is in brick, partly whitewashed, partly rendered, with stone quoins and a slate roof. It has two storeys and a three-bay front. On the front is a two-storey porch with a round-headed entrance containing stone benches. The windows are casements.	II
Church House Farmhouse; 53.67712°N 2.79401°W	—	1698	The former farmhouse is in brick on a plinth, with stone quoins and a stone-slate roof. It has two storeys and a three-bay front, with a single-storey extension at the rear of the third bay. On the front is a two-storey gabled porch containing a segmental-headed doorway with a datestone above. Most of the glazing has been altered. Inside the house is an inglenook and a bressumer.	II
Farmhouse; 53.68178°N 2.80026°W	—	1702	A brick farmhouse with a corrugated iron roof, it has two storeys and a three-bay front. On the front is a two-storey gabled porch and a datestone. Most of the windows have been altered; on the front there is a mullioned window and some casements, and on the rear are sliding sash windows.	II
Martinside Farmhouse; 53.67693°N 2.79509°W	—	1718 (or earlier)	The former farmhouse is in brick with blue brick diapering and it has a stone-slate roof. The house has an L-shaped plan consisting of a two-bay main range and a projection porch wing on the right side.	II
Windmill; 53.68086°N 2.81563°W	—	1741	The former windmill has been converted into a house. It is in rendered brick with a wooden cap. The building has three tapering storeys, and has a modern door and windows. On the northwest side is a cruciform iron plate for the former sails.	II
Barn, Blackamoor Hall; 53.67732°N 2.79798°W	—	18th century (probable)	The barn is mainly in brick, with some sandstone, and has a roof of blue slate with some red tiles. It has a long rectangular plan, and is in probably five bays. It contains a wagon entrance, doorways, windows, a round pitching hole, and ventilation holes in diamond patterns.	II
Barn, Copeland Farm; 53.67812°N 2.78207°W	—	1779	A brick barn with a stone-slate roof in a rectangular plan. It contains ventilation holes in a diamond pattern, doorways, and windows. On the north side is a wagon doorway, and in the east gable are an inscribed lintel, a circular pitching hole, and an owl hole.	II
St John the Baptist's Church; 53.67771°N 2.79508°W		1840	A Commissioners' Church that was designed by Edmund Sharpe, and restored by his successors Austin and Paley in 1898, who also added the chancel and vestry in 1908–09. It is built in sandstone with slate roofs, and is mainly in Perpendicular style. The church consists of a five-bay nave with a south porch, a two-bay chancel, and a slender west steeple. The steeple has a tower with a porch that is open to the north and south, diagonal buttresses, a stepped parapet with crocketed pinnacles on the corners, and a slim octagonal spire.	II
Rectory; 53.67762°N 2.79452°W	—	1840 (probable)	The rectory is in red brick with sandstone dressings and a slate roof, and is in Jacobean style. There are two storeys and a symmetrical three-bay front. In the front is a central Tudor arched doorway with a fanlight, and the windows are sashes.	II
War memorial 53.67794°N 2.80159°W	—	1921	The war memorial stands in a small garden at a road junction. It has a base of two steps, the lower step in sandstone with a top of Portland stone, the upper step is in Portland stone, and at the corners are granite bollards with domed tops. On the base is a plinth with a cornice and a pyramidal top, and a Latin cross splayed at the bottom. On the face of the cross a reversed sword is carved. On the sides of the plinth are slate plaques with inscriptions and the names of those lost in both World Wars. The memorial is in a paved area surrounded by granite posts and a link chain.	II
