= Listed buildings in Hilldale =

Hilldale is a civil parish in the West Lancashire district of Lancashire, England. It contains seven listed buildings that are recorded in the National Heritage List for England. All the listed buildings are designated at Grade II, the lowest of the three grades, which is applied to "buildings of national importance and special interest". The parish contains the small communities of Hilldale and Andertons Mill, and is almost entirely rural. Apart from a medieval cross base, the listed buildings are all houses, farmhouses, or farm buildings.

== Buildings ==
Name and location	Photograph	Date	Notes
Cross base 53.61528°N 2.73147°W	—	Medieval (probable)	The cross base is in sandstone, and consists of a roughly rectangular boulder with a socket toward the south end.
Bannister Farmhouse; 53.61059°N 2.75643°W	—	17th century	The farmhouse was later extended and altered. It is in sandstone with a slate roof, and has two storeys. There is a central two-bay section, flanked by one-bay cross wings of different sizes. The windows are mullioned, and the doorway has plain reveals. At the rear of the left-hand wing is a stair turret.
Stoney Lane Farmhouse; 53.60035°N 2.74598°W	—	Mid 17th century	The house has been altered and extended. It is in sandstone with quoins and a stone-slate roof. There is a three-story three-bay main range, and a lower range to the left with two storeys and two bays. On the front is a full-height porch containing a doorway with a massive lintel. The windows are casements.
Barn, Sanderson House Farm; 53.61994°N 2.73746°W	—	Late 17th century	The barn is in sandstone and incorporates some earlier timber. It is a high, wide building with five bays, and contains large quoins, doorways, windows and ventilation slits.
Gate piers and wall, Sanderson House Farm; 53.61986°N 2.73769°W	—	18th century	The gate piers and garden wall are in sandstone. The two piers have a square plan, moulded cornices and ball finials. The wall has saddleback coping, and runs along the east and north sides of the garden.
Fairhurst Hall; 53.59928°N 2.77163°W	—	Mid 18th century)	The house contains some material from the 16th century. It is in brick with sandstone dressings and a hipped slate roof, and has two storeys. The house is in a half-H plan with a central section of three bays and two-bay cross wings. The south front has a plinth, quoins, and a cornice. The central doorway has a rusticated surround, and the windows are sashes. Inside the house some wattle and daub infill is visible.
Sanderson House Farmhouse; 53.61981°N 2.73779°W	—	Mid 18th century (probable)	A sandstone house with a slate roof in two storeys and three bays. The widows are 20th-century casements, and over the lintels are projecting bands. Above the upper floor windows there are gablets.
