= Listed buildings in Salesbury =

Salesbury is a civil parish in Ribble Valley, Lancashire, England. It contains four listed buildings that are recorded in the National Heritage List for England. All of the listed buildings are designated at Grade II, the lowest of the three grades, which is applied to "buildings of national importance and special interest". The parish contains the village of Salesbury and the residential area of Copster Green, and is otherwise rural. The listed buildings consist of a farmhouse with an attached stable, and two houses, one with a sundial base in the grounds.

== Buildings ==
Name and location	Photograph	Date	Notes
Lovely Hall; 53.79699°N 2.48977°W		c. 1600	The house was altered in 1735 and in 1874. It is in sandstone with a stone-slate roof, and has two storeys. The house has an H-shaped plan, with a central three-bay range and cross wings, and to the right is a later extension. The windows in the ground floor are mullioned and transomed, and in the upper floor they are sashes. In the middle of the main range is a single-storey porch that has a parapet stepped over a shaped inscribed lintel. The right wing contains a two-storey canted bay window. On the parapet of the house are urns.
Copster Hall Farmhouse and stable 53.80328°N 2.49189°W	—	1615	The house and stable are in sandstone with a slate roof, and have two storeys. The house has two bays, with modern windows in the ground floor, and mullioned and transomed windows in the upper floor. The doorway has a chamfered surround and an inscribed Tudor arched lintel. The stable to the south has a door, a pitching hole, and a sash window.
Bolton Hall; 53.80246°N 2.49660°W		1655	A sandstone house with a stone-slate roof, in two storeys and three bays. The windows are mullioned. On the front is a two-storey porch that has a doorway with a chamfered surround, and a lintel that has lost its inscription. Inside the house is an inglenook and a bressumer.
Sundial base 53.79680°N 2.48975°W	—	1668	The sundial base is in the grounds of Lovely Hall. It is in sandstone and has a square plan. The faces have carved decoration, the lower part is chamfered, and it carries an inscription.
