= Listed buildings in Newburgh, Lancashire =

Newburgh is a civil parish in the West Lancashire district of Lancashire, England. It contains 37 buildings that are recorded in the National Heritage List for England as designated listed buildings. Of these, one is at Grade II*, the middle grade, and the others are at Grade II, the lowest grade. The parish contains the village of Newburgh and surrounding countryside. Most of the listed buildings are houses, farmhouses and farm buildings. The Leeds and Liverpool Canal and the River Douglas run through the parish, and associated with these are aqueducts and a culvert. The other listed buildings include a village cross, a public house, a post office, a war memorial, and a telephone kiosk.

== Key ==
Grade	Criteria
II*	Particularly important buildings of more than special interest
II	Buildings of national importance and special interest

== Buildings ==
Name and location	Photograph	Date	Notes	Grade
White Cottages; 53.58994°N 2.78756°W	—	17th century or earlier	Originally a farmhouse with attached shippon, it has been converted into two cottages. The building is cruck framed with rendered stone cladding at the front and sides and brick at the rear. It has a stone-slate roof, there is a single storey with lofts, and a front of four bays. The windows are casements, and there is a porch in front of the right-hand door. At the left gable end is a lean-to extension and an attic window. Inside the building are three full cruck trusses.	II
Rose Cottage; 53.58561°N 2.78163°W	—	Early 17th century (probable)	Originally a timber-framed farmhouse, it was altered in the 18th century. The house is mostly clad in sandstone and has a stone-slate roof. There are two storeys and three bays, and there is exposed timber-framing in the left gable wall. The doorway is to the right and has a wedge lintel. The ground floor windows are horizontal sliding sashes with rectangular lintels and hood moulds, and in the upper floor the windows are casements. Inside the house is an inglenook and a bressumer.	II
Doe House; 53.58626°N 2.78425°W	—	17th century	Originally a farmhouse, it is in sandstone and some brick, with quoins and a slate roof, and is in two storeys. The main part has two bays, there is a one-bay rear wing, and a later extension. On the front is a combined porch and stair turret containing a doorway with a chamfered surround and a segmental head, and a small stair window. The other windows on the front are casements. In the left gable wall are horizontal sliding sash windows. Inside the house is an inglenook and a bressumer.	II
Village Cross; 53.58586°N 2.78168°W		17th century	The cross was restored in the 20th century, and is in sandstone. There are three old square steps, and a 20th-century simple cross.	II
Ivy Cottage Farmhouse; 53.58902°N 2.78421°W	—	Late 17th century	The farmhouse is in sandstone with some brick, all roughcast, with a composition tile roof. It has two storeys and three bays. There is a two-storey gabled porch with a datestone. All the windows are 20th-century casements with rendered surrounds. Inside the house is a timber-framed partition with wattle and daub infill.	II
Kathry; 53.59006°N 2.79524°W	—	Late 17th century	Originally a farmhouse, it is in sandstone with a slate roof. The house has an L-shaped plan, with a two-bay main range and a one-bay rear wing. There is a later outshut in the rear angle. On the front facing the road are two casement windows in each floor. In the right return are two small windows, the upper one with a mullion, and a 20th-century wooden porch. Inside the house is a timber-framed partition, now concealed.	II
Lys Cottage; 53.58596°N 2.78095°W	—	1691	The building originated as a farmhouse, later two cottages, and then a single dwelling, it is in brick on a sandstone plinth and has a stone-slate roof. There are two storeys, and the building has an L-shaped plan, with a two-bay range and a two-bay cross wing to the left. On the front of the main range are paired doorways with a slate canopy. The windows are casements, and under the gable of the cross wing is a decorated datestone. Inside the house is an inglenook and a bressumer.	II
Derby House; 53.58629°N 2.78032°W	—	Late 17th or very early 18th century	Originally a farmhouse, later an inn, and then a private house, the building was enlarged in the 18th century. It is in stuccoed sandstone with a stone-slate roof. The house has an asymmetric U-shaped plan, with a main two-bay range, a cross wing to the left, and a wing at the rear on the right. There are two storeys, and the cross wing is gabled. The doorway, which is square headed with stone jambs and lintel, is set in a round-headed moulded surround. There is a sliding sash window in the rear wing, and all the other windows are casements.	II
Ivy Dene and School Villas; 53.58614°N 2.78270°W	—	Late 17th or early 18th century	Originally a school, later converted into two dwellings, the building is in sandstone with a roof of stone-slate and some composition tiles. It has a T-shaped plan, with a four-bay main range, and a south wing, and is in two storeys. Features include coped gables with the stumps of finials, mullioned and transomed windows with almost-semicircular heads, mullioned windows, and cross windows.	II
Lowe's Farmhouse; 53.57745°N 2.78927°W	—	c. 1700	The former farmhouse is in rendered sandstone with a chamfered plinth and a composition tile roof. There are three storeys and a symmetrical three-bay front. The central doorway has a Gibbs surround, and the windows have been altered. At the rear is a 20th-century porch.	II
Boundary Farmhouse; 53.58678°N 2.77456°W	—	c. 1700–30	The farmhouse is in sandstone with a stone-slate roof in two storeys and two bays. The doorway has a plain surround and a pitched stone slab canopy on wooden brackets. The windows are mullioned, and at the rear are service rooms under a catslide roof.	II
Woodcock Hall; 53.58253°N 2.78224°W	—	1719	A country house in brick on a sandstone plinth with a stone-slate roof. It has 2 1/2 storeys and three bays. On the front is a central doorway with a moulded doorcase and a semicircular hood on elaborate brackets. The windows are cross windows. At the rear is a 19th-century single-storey kitchen wing. Inside the house is an inglenook and a bressumer.	II*
The Cottage and Lynley Cottage; 53.58624°N 2.78103°W	—	Early 18th century (probable)	A pair of roughcast cottages with a slate roof in two storeys. The Cottage has two bays, and Lynley Cottage has one. Both cottages have doorways with a 20th-century slate canopy. The windows in The Cottage are casements, and in Lynley Cottage they are sashes.	II
The Retreat; 53.58560°N 2.78221°W		Early 18th century	Originally a house with an attached cottage, later converted into a single dwelling, the house is in brick with a sandstone plinth and a stone-slate roof. It has two storeys and three bays. There are two doorways with flat-arched heads, and the windows are casements.	II
Barn, Lowe's Farm; 53.57770°N 2.78968°W	—	Early to mid 18th century (probable)	The barn is in sandstone with a stone-slate roof, and has seven bays. It has a central wagon entrance, outshuts on the east side, and altered windows. On the south gable end are external steps leading to a loft.	II
Farm building, Boundary Farm; 53.58672°N 2.77481°W	—	1739	A brick building, with some sandstone, and a roof mainly in stone-slate with some slate. There are three bays and an extension at the rear. On the front are two doorways and four windows, and above the right doorway is a datestone. In the left gable wall are a doorway, a window, and a loading door. All the openings have segmental heads.	II
Moorcroft House; 53.58587°N 2.78116°W	—	1741	A brick house, later divided into flats, with a sandstone plinth and dressings, and a slate roof. There are two storeys with attics, and a symmetrical front of three bays. The doorway, approached by one semicircular step, has a moulded architrave, a fanlight with four panes, and a large semicircular canopy on elaborate consoles. The windows are sashes, each with a keystone. There are attic windows in the gable walls.	II
Greenhill Farmhouse; 53.58657°N 2.77856°W	—	1748	The house is in brown and yellow brick on a sandstone plinth and it has a stone-slate roof. There are two storeys with an attic, and a symmetrical three-bay front. Above the central doorway is a gabled stone slab canopy with an inscribed tympanum. The windows on the front are sashes with flat-arched heads and keystones. On the right return is a casement window, a sliding sash window, and an attic window. The rear windows have been altered.	II
Cross View; 53.58620°N 2.78124°W	—	Mid 18th century (probable)	Originally a farmhouse, the house is roughcast, probably on brick, and has a plinth and a stone-slate roof. There are two storeys and a symmetrical two-bay front. In the centre is a door with a 20th-centurywiooden porch. The windows have been altered and contain two-light casements.	II
Red Lion Inn; 53.58638°N 2.78091°W		18th century (probable)	The public house has later additions at the rear, and has incorporated a cottage to the left. It is roughcast with stone-slate roofs, and has an irregular plan with two storeys. The original part has three bays and the former cottage has one bay. The windows are casements and the doorway has been altered.	II
Rosehill Cottage; 53.58623°N 2.78045°W	—	Mid 18th century	A brick house with a stone-slate roof, in two storeys and with a symmetrical two-bay front. In the ground floor is a central doorway with a plain surround flanked by 20th-century bowed oriel windows. The windows in the upper floor are sashes, and in the left gable wall is a small attic window. The attic contains an upper-cruck roof truss.	II
The Gables; 53.58617°N 2.78138°W	—	18th century	Originally a barn, later converted into a dwelling, the house is in sandstone, partly pebbledashed, with a stone-slate roof. There are two storeys, and three bays with a rear extension. The doorway has a fanlight, and the windows are sashes.	II
Vicarage Farmhouse; 53.58681°N 2.78484°W	—	Mid 18th century	Originally a farmhouse, later a vicarage, and then a private house, it is stuccoed on a sandstone plinth, and has a roof partly in stone-slate and partly in slate. The house has two storeys with a cellar and an attic, and there are three bays. The doorway has a wooden surround, and all the windows have moulded architraves; most windows are sashes and there is also a 20th-century casement window. At the rear is a stair window.	II
Sherleen and Wayside; 53.58694°N 2.77878°W	—	Mid to late 18th century	Originally a farmhouse, it was later converted into two dwellings. The building is in brick on a sandstone plinth with a stone-slate roof and has two storeys. It is in an L-shaped plan with a three-bay main range, and an extension to the rear. The doorway has a 20th-century canopy, and the windows are casements.	II
Tawd Culvert; 53.58910°N 2.80433°W	—	c. 1771 (probable)	The culvert carries the River Tawd under the Leeds and Liverpool Canal, and was rebuilt in 1838. It is in sandstone, and consists of a single round-headed arch with rusticated voussoirs, a dated keystone, a moulded cornice, a set-back parapet, and splayed abutments.	II
Newburgh Aqueduct; 53.58857°N 2.77352°W	—	1771–72	The aqueduct carries the Leeds and Liverpool Canal over the River Douglas. It is in sandstone, and consists of a single semi-elliptical arch with plain voussoirs and a band.	II
Canal Aqueduct, Culvert Lane; 53.59098°N 2.78410°W		c. 1771–74	The aqueduct carries the Leeds and Liverpool Canal over Culvert Lane. It is in sandstone with some brick, and consists of a low semicircular arched culvert with plain voussoirs, a cornice and a parapet.	II
Canal Aqueduct, Deans Lane; 53.59318°N 2.79055°W		c. 1771–74	The aqueduct carries the Leeds and Liverpool Canal over Deans Lane. It is in sandstone with some brick, and consists of a low semicircular arched culvert with plain voussoirs flanked by raked abutments. There is a short central parapet with rounded coping.	II
Spring Cottage; 53.58639°N 2.78000°W	—	Late 18th century	A sandstone house, originally two cottages, with a composition tile roof. It has two storeys and two bays, In the ground floor is a doorway at the right end, and two casement windows, all with wedge lintels, and in the upper floor are two casement windows.	II
Giant's Hall; 53.59143°N 2.78417°W	—	Late 18th or very early 19th century	Originally a farmhouse, later divided into two dwellings, it is in sandstone, partly pebbledashed, with rusticated quoins and a hipped slate roof. There are two storeys and a symmetrical three-bay front. On the front are double doors and a 20th-century porch. The windows are sashes that have wedge lintels with pseudo-voussoirs and keystones. At the rear is a full height semi-elliptical blank arch and a re-set datestone.	II
Stone Cross and garden wall 53.58576°N 2.78191°W		Late 18th or early 19th century	A house in red and yellow brick with sandstone dressings and a stone-slate roof, in two storeys. It consists of a main section and an annex protruding forward on the left. In the ground floor of the main part is a central narrow window flanked by casement windows, and in the upper floor are two sash windows. The doorway is in the right return of the annex, which also contains windows of various types. The attached garden wall consists of large stone slabs secured by diamond-shaped cast iron plates.	II
Snape Cottage; 53.59008°N 2.79301°W		1809	A sandstone cottage, partly rendered, with a slate roof. There are two storeys and two bays. All the openings on the front have wedge lintels, the windows being casements, and above the doorway is a datestone. On the left of the cottage is a small lean-to porch, and attached to the right side is a lean-to outbuilding.	II
Brookside; 53.58588°N 2.77569°W	—	Early 19th century	A sandstone house with a slate roof, it has raised quoins, a plain frieze, and a moulded cornice. There are two storeys and a symmetrical three-bay front. In the centre is a round-headed doorway with plain pilasters, imposts, a moulded head with a keystone, and a fanlight. The windows on the front are sashes with wedge lintels, and elsewhere are altered windows. At the rear is a lean-to porch.	II
Post Office; 53.58693°N 2.78358°W		Early 19th century (probable)	The Post Office is in red and yellow brick and has a stone-slate roof. There are two storeys, and the main part has a symmetrical front with a round-headed doorway approached up two steps. The doorway has a plain surround, imposts, and a keystone. There are two sash windows in each floor. To the left is a lower two-storey extension with a Welsh slate roof and casement windows.	II
North View, Braden Cottage and Sun Dew; 53.58618°N 2.78056°W	—	Mid to late 19th century	A row of three brick cottages with a stone-slate roof in two storeys. Each cottage has a single bay. The central cottage, Braden Cottage, has sash windows, and the other windows have been altered.	II
War memorial 53.58703°N 2.78490°W		Early 20th century	The war memorial stands on three steps and is 2.5 metres (8 ft 2 in) high. The bottom step consists of concrete flags, and the rest of the memorial is in sandstone. On the base is a plinth surmounted by a stepped and tapering obelisk, at the top of which is pyramidal coping. There are inscriptions and laurel wreathes on the faces of the obelisk, together with the names of those lost in the First World War. The names of those lost in the Second World War are on the plinth.	II
Telephone kiosk 53.58575°N 2.78177°W		1935	A K6 type telephone kiosk, designed by Giles Gilbert Scott. Constructed in cast iron with a square plan and a dome, it has three unperforated crowns in the top panels.	II
