= Listed buildings in Nateby, Lancashire =

Nateby is a civil parish in the Wyre district of Lancashire, England. It contains four listed buildings that are recorded in the National Heritage List for England. All the listed buildings are designated at Grade II, the lowest of the three grades, which is applied to "buildings of national importance and special interest". The parish contains the village of Nateby and the surrounding countryside. The Lancaster Canal passes through the parish, and a bridge crossing it is listed. The other listed buildings are a country house and associated structures, and a farmhouse.

== Buildings ==
Name and location	Photograph	Date	Notes
Bowers House; 53.90234°N 2.80773°W	—	c. 1627	A that was altered in the 18th and 20th centuries. It is in pebbledashed brick with a slate roof and has three storeys. The front has three bays flanked by narrow one-bay gabled wings. The windows were originally mullioned, and most have been replaced, with one eight-light mullioned window remaining in the right return. The central doorway has a stone surround with pilasters and a moulded elliptical head containing a fanlight.
Gate piers, Bowers House; 53.90220°N 2.80781°W	—	Early 18th century (probable)	A pair of gate piers in sandstone. They are square, with moulded cornices and large decorated ball finials.
Ford Green Farmhouse; 53.91459°N 2.79762°W	—	Mid 18th century	The farmhouse is in rendered brick with a slate roof, and has two storeys and three bays. The windows are sashes with stone sills and rendered reveals. The doorway has a stone moulded surround and cornice. At the rear of the house is a stair turret.
Cathouse Bridge; 53.90180°N 2.78848°W		1797	This is bridge No. 64 over the Lancaster Canal, and carries Nateby Crossing Lane over the canal. It is in sandstone and consists of a single elliptical arch. The bridge has a stepped keystone below a solid parapet with a rounded top.
