= Listed buildings in Anderton, Lancashire =

Anderton is a civil parish in the Borough of Chorley, Lancashire, England. It contains twelve buildings that are recorded in the National Heritage List for England as designated listed buildings, all of which are listed at Grade II. This grade is the lowest of the three gradings given to listed buildings and is applied to "buildings of national importance and special interest". The parish is mainly rural, with its northern part containing residential areas linking with the town of Adlington. The listed buildings reflect the agricultural history of the parish, with nine of them being farmhouses or farm buildings. The other listed buildings are a portion of a medieval cross, the remains of a set of stocks, and a house from the early 20th century.

== Buildings ==
Name and location	Photograph	Date	Notes
Cross; 53.61234°N 2.57740°W		Before 1066 (probable)	Part of the shaft of a cross, later converted into the pedestal of a guidepost. It is rectangular, in gritstone, about 1 metre (3 ft 3 in) high, and carved with various subjects on all four sides. On top of the shaft is a rectangular slab of stone, the sides carved with the names of towns in archaic spelling. The structure is also a scheduled monument.
Barn and shippon, Roscoe Lowe Farm; 53.61543°N 2.57887°W	—	1588	The barn is the older part, with the shippon added at right angles in 1683. They are in sandstone with roofs mainly in slate and some stone-slate. The barn has six bays, and contains ventilation slits, wagon entrances, a blocked doorway and a datestone. The shippon has 1 1/2 storeys and two bays. It contains a doorway with a large lintel, a square opening to the left, and another datestone.
Greenhalgh Farmhouse; 53.62011°N 2.59118°W	—	17th century (probable)	A sandstone farmhouse with a slate roof, it was expanded at the rear at an early date giving it an L-shaped plan. The house has two storeys and a front of two bays. Most of the windows are mullioned, and one has been replaced by a sliding sash window.
Roscoe Lowe Farmhouse; 53.61538°N 2.57946°W	—	1683	A farmhouse that was extended in 1759 by the addition of a larger wing at right angles, forming an L-shaped plan. The building is in sandstone with stone-slate roofs. Both parts are in two storeys, the older part with two bays, and the newer part with three. The older part has a large single-storey gabled porch, and inside is a timber-framed partition, and the remains of a cruck blade. Some of the windows are mullioned, others have been altered.
Norris Fold Farmhouse and Cottage; 53.61427°N 2.59126°W	—	1710	The farmhouse and cottage, which was added in the 18th century, are now combined as one dwelling. They are in sandstone with slate roofs. The farmhouse has two storeys and an attic, and a two-bay front, with a tall gabled stair turret at the junction of the bays. The cottage extends from the rear of the first bay, and has two storeys and two bays. Inside the farmhouse is an inglenook, a bressumer, and a timber-framed partition with wattle and daub infill. The garden wall to the east and south is included in the listing.
Heskins Farmhouse; 53.61044°N 2.57936°W	—	1715	A sandstone farmhouse, the roof at the front being of stone-slate, and at the rear of slate. It has two storeys, with a lean-to extension at the rear. The doorway is at the left and has a large inscribed lintel. To the right of this are two windows in each floor, all with altered glazing.
Stable, Anderton Old Hall Farm; 53.60061°N 2.56320°W	—	1720	The stable is in sandstone with slate roofs, and has apex finials on the gables. It is in a rectangular plan, with two storeys and three bays, with a modern brick extension to the third bay. The other bays contain doorways, windows, and a loft door. At the rear are ventilation slits, and in the east side is a mullioned window.
Tan Pits Farmhouse; 53.61707°N 2.57348°W	—	1722	A farmhouse later used as an office in gritstone with a slate roof. There are two storeys and an attic, and a two-bay front. At the rear is a single-storey extension, and an outshut, and on the right side is a lean-to addition. Some of the windows are mullioned, and others have been altered.
Pig sty, Tan Pits Farm; 53.61719°N 2.57332°W	—	Early 18th century (probable)	The pig sty is in sandstone with a stone-slate roof. It has a rectangular plan, and consists of a gabled single-storey pig house, and a wall surrounding two pens.
Barn, Anderton Old Hall Farm; 53.60042°N 2.56341°W	—	Early 18th century (probable)	A sandstone barn with a slate roof, in a rectangular plan and eight bays. It contains ventilation slits, a porch over a wagon entrance, and inserted windows. In the south gable end are three doors and a loft opening, and at the north end is a lean-to extension, a loading door, and a worn datestone.
Stocks; 53.61236°N 2.57749°W		1808	The stocks consist of two square posts with rounded heads. There are slots on the inner sides of the posts for rails. The upper rail is missing, the lower one is present but damaged. The bench is missing.
Brown Low; 53.62096°N 2.58319°W	—	1907	A gritstone house with stone-slab roofs in Vernacular Revival style by Charles Holden. It has two storeys and three irregular bays, with a kitchen wing at the rear. Most of the windows are mullioned. Inside is Arts and Crafts joinery.
