= Listed buildings in Osbaldeston =

Heritage buildings in Osbaldeston, Lancashire, England

Osbaldeston is a civil parish in Ribble Valley, Lancashire, England. It contains five listed buildings that are recorded in the National Heritage List for England. Of these, three are at Grade II*, the middle grade, and the other two are at Grade II, the lowest grade. The parish contains the village of Osbaldeston, and is otherwise rural. The listed buildings consist of two country houses, a barn, a church with attached presbytery, and a school.

== Key ==
Grade	Criteria
II*	Particularly important buildings of more than special interest
II	Buildings of national importance and special interest

== Buildings ==
Name and location	Photograph	Date	Notes	Grade
Osbaldeston Hall; 53.80487°N 2.54175°W		c.1600	A country house, originally timber-framed and later encased partly in sandstone and partly in brick; the roof is slated. There are remains of cruck trusses and timber-framing inside the house. It has two storeys and is in an L-shaped plan. The west wing is the oldest part and contains two square bay windows. The north range is more complex, and has projecting bays. The windows in the house are mullioned or mullioned and transomed. The doorway has an inscribed lintel.	II*
Barn, Oxendale Hall Farm; 53.79571°N 2.53193°W	—	c.1600	The barn is cruck-framed, and the walls were originally timber-framed; these have been replaced by sandstone and brick. The roof is slated. There are various lean-to extensions. Inside the barn are three cruck trusses.	II*
Oxendale Hall; 53.79597°N 2.53128°W		1656	A country house in sandstone with a stone-slate roof, in two storeys with attics. On the front is a two-storey porch with an attic, containing a doorway with a moulded surround, a segmental head, and an inscribed lintel. On each side of the porch is a bay with a gabled attic dormer, and to the left of these is a cross wing. The windows are mullioned. Inside the house is a bressumer and a timber-framed partition with wattle and daub infill.	II*
St Mary's Church and presbytery 53.78178°N 2.53476°W		1837–38	A Roman Catholic church with attached presbytery in sandstone with slate roofs. The church is in Gothic Revival style. It has buttresses with pinnacles, and windows with pointed heads containing mullions and transoms. On the west gable is a square bellcote with an embattled parapet. Inside the church is a west gallery. The presbytery is in Tudor style, and has two storeys and three bays. The windows and doorway have drip moulds. The windows are mullioned, and the doorway has a chamfered surround and a pointed head.	II
School; 53.78133°N 2.53514°W	—	1845	The school is in sandstone with a slate roof, and has one storey. In the centre is a gabled porch, on each return of which is a doorway with a chamfered surround. Flanking the porch are mullioned windows. The east and west walls have windows with Perpendicular tracery, and on the gables are cross finials.	II
