= Listed buildings in Cabus =

Cabus is a civil parish in the Wyre district of Lancashire, England. It contains seven listed buildings that are recorded in the National Heritage List for England. All the listed buildings are designated at Grade II, the lowest of the three grades, which is applied to "buildings of national importance and special interest". The parish includes the northern part of the town of Garstang and is otherwise mainly rural. Its listed buildings consist of a medieval cross, two farmhouses, a former toll house, a public house, a boundary stone, and a milestone.

== Buildings ==
| Name and location | Photograph | Date | Notes |
|---|---|---|---|
| Cabus Cross; 53.92825°N 2.78619°W | — | Medieval (probable) | The cross is in sandstone and consists of a roughly squared base with a socket that carries a rectangular shaft over 2 metres (6 ft 7 in) high. |
| Kiln Trees Farmhouse; 53.93033°N 2.78894°W | — | Late 17th or early 18th century | The farmhouse is rendered and has an iron corrugated roof. It has two storeys and three bays. The windows have plain reveals, those in the upper floor being horizontal sashes, and in the ground floor is a mullioned window. |
| Snape Wood Farmhouse; 53.91705°N 2.78861°W | — | Mid 18th century | A sandstone farmhouse with a slate roof, in two storeys and with three bays. The windows have chamfered surrounds and the mullions have been removed. The doorway has stone surround with a slight chamfer. |
| Toll Bar with pair of turnpike gate piers 53.91375°N 2.77658°W | — | Late 18th century | A toll house in sandstone with a slate roof. The gable wall faces the road, and has two bays in the centre and one at the sides. In the central bay are modern windows and a doorway with a plain surround and a cornice hood. These are flanked by small round-headed windows. The turnpike gate piers are in limestone and have a circular plan. |
| Hamilton Arms Hotel; 53.93781°N 2.77487°W | | Early to mid 19th century | A stuccoed public house with a slate roof in two storeys. There is a central sandstone porch flanked by two bays on each side. The porch has three Greek Doric columns and an entablature, and above it is a carved coat of arms. Inside the porch are two doorways, the left one blocked. The windows are modern. The building and the central bay are flanked by pilasters, and at the top of the building is a cornice and a pediment with antefixae. |
| Boundary Stone; 53.94273°N 2.77617°W | — | 19th century | The stone marks the boundary between the parishes of Cabus and Forton. It is in sandstone and has a triangular plan. Its faces are inscribed with "CABUS" AND "CLEVELEY". |
| Milestone; 53.93722°N 2.77472°W | | 19th century | The milestone is in sandstone with a semicircular base and triangular above. It has cast iron plates inscribed with the distances in miles to Lancaster and to Preston. |
