= Listed buildings in Croston =

Croston is a civil parish in the Borough of Chorley, Lancashire, England. The parish contains 47 buildings that are recorded in the National Heritage List for England as designated listed buildings. Of these, one is listed at Grade II*, the middle grade, and the others are at Grade II, the lowest grade. The parish contains the village of Croston, and this is surrounded by agricultural land. Passing through the parish are the River Yarrow and the new cut of the River Douglas. Most of the listed buildings are farmhouses, farm buildings, and houses, some of which originated as farmhouses. The other listed buildings include churches, almshouses, a village cross, public houses, a school, bridges, a former rectory and associated structures, and a telephone kiosk.

== Key ==
| Grade | Criteria |
|---|---|
| II* | Particularly important buildings of more than special interest |
| II | Buildings of national importance and special interest |

== Buildings ==
| Name and location | Photograph | Date | Notes | Grade |
|---|---|---|---|---|
| St Michael's Church; 53.65950°N 2.77315°W | | 15th century | The oldest part is the tower, with most of the church dating from the 16th century, and later alterations. It is built in sandstone, and consists of a nave, a chancel, both with aisles, a south porch, and a large west tower that is mainly embraced by the nave. The tower is in four stages, it has buttresses and contains a west door and window, clock faces on the north and south sides, and louvred bell openings. At the top is an embattled parapet with corner and intermediate pinnacles. | II* |
| Cross; 53.66016°N 2.77349°W | | 16th or 17th century (probable) | The village cross is in Church Street. It is in stone and has a base of four square steps, which are surmounted by a restored modern cross. | II |
| 35 Grape Lane; 53.65829°N 2.76896°W | — | 17th century (or earlier) | Formerly a farmhouse, it is cruck-framed with rendered brick cladding and a thatched roof. The house has 1 1/2 storeys and three bays, with modern extensions at the right and the rear. The windows are casements, those in the upper floor in dormers. Inside the house are two full cruck trusses with wattle and daub infill. | II |
| 46 Town Road; 53.66074°N 2.77461°W | — | 17th century | The house is in stuccoed brick on a high stone plinth with a stone-slate roof. There are two storeys and two bays, with the gable end facing the road; this contains a doorway and casement windows. | II |
| 66 and 68 Town Road, 2 Church Street; 53.66013°N 2.77324°W | — | 17th century (or earlier) | Originally a farmhouse, later extended and used as two shops and a house. The building is mainly in brick, partly roughcast, with some sandstone and with slate roofs. There are two storeys and a front of five bays. On the front are two gables, two shop fronts, a round-headed doorway with a keystone and a fanlight, and sash windows. Inside No. 66 is extensive timber-framing. | II |
| Lord Nelson public house 53.66151°N 2.77399°W | | 17th century | The building was extended in the 18th and 19th centuries. It is in stuccoed brick on a stone plinth with stone-slate roofs, and has two storeys. The main block, dating from the 18th century has two bays and a central doorway. The gabled wing to the right is from the 17th century; both parts contain sash windows. The 19th-century wing is behind the first bay of the main block. Inside the 17th-century wing is an inglenook and a bressumer. | II |
| Rectory; 53.65962°N 2.77223°W | — | 17th century (probable) | The rectory was remodelled in 1722, giving it a Baroque front. It is built in stuccoed brick and has a slate roof. There are three storeys and a seven-bay front. In the centre three bays is a large bow window with a doorway having an architrave of Corinthian semi-columns and an open pediment containing a shield. Each pair of outer bays has a Dutch gable. The windows are sashes. | II |
| 53 Drinkhouse Road; 53.65842°N 2.78000°W | — | Late 17th century (probable) | Formerly a farmhouse, it is in painted brick on a stone base with a tiled roof. There are two storeys and two bays, with a segmental-headed doorway to the left. The windows on the front are casements, and there is a mullioned window at the rear. Inside are an inglenook fireplace and a bressumer. | II |
| Bridge End Farmhouse; 53.65532°N 2.81213°W | — | Late 17th century (probable) | The farmhouse is in roughcast brick on a stone plinth. It has two storeys and is in a T-shaped plan, with a wing added to the rear of the original building. The original part has two bays and a slate roof, the wing is in a single bay with a red tiled roof. Inside the original part is a large inglenook fireplace and a bressumer. | II |
| Croston Mill Bridge; 53.65571°N 2.76177°W | | Late 17th century | The bridge, which was widened in the 18th century, carries a road over the River Yarrow. It is in sandstone, and consists of a single segmental arch. The bridge has voussoirs, a string band, and a humped parapet with wing walls and saddleback coping. | II |
| Hey House Farmhouse; 53.65846°N 2.78343°W | — | Late 17th or early 18th century | A brick farmhouse with a slate roof in two storeys and three bays. On the front is a single-storey gabled porch, and the glazing has been altered. Inside are back-to-back inglenook fireplaces. | II |
| Town Bridge; 53.66022°N 2.77375°W | | 1682 | A public road bridge carrying The Hillocks over the River Yarrow. It is in sandstone, and consists of a single segmental arch. The bridge has rounded coping to the parapets, and a humped deck paved with setts. On the apex of the west parapet is a stone carved with the date. The bridge is also a scheduled monument. | II |
| 129 and 133 Station Road; 53.66232°N 2.77498°W | — | 1692 | Originally three almshouses, later converted into two cottages. They are in sandstone with a stone-slate roof and have a single storey and three bays. On the front are two doorways, four casement windows, and a triangular-headed inscribed stone plaque. | II |
| Barn, Town Road; 53.66013°N 2.77307°W | — | c. 1700 (probable) | A brick barn with a slate roof, it is in two storeys and two bays. On the front are garage doors, a blocked doorway and a loading door above. | II |
| 13 and 15 Church Street; 53.65980°N 2.77349°W | — | 1704 | A house, later divided into two dwellings, in brick with a stone-slate roof. There are three storeys and two bays. On the front is a carved stone cartouche. Most of the windows are sashes, with casement windows in the left gable end. | II |
| 1 and 3 Out Lane; 53.66195°N 2.77361°W | — | 1705 | Originally a farmhouse and a barn, later converted into two houses, they are in brick, partly rendered and partly roughcast, and have thatched roofs covered in asbestos tiles. The houses are in two storeys, No. 1, the former farmhouse, has two bays, and No. 3, formerly the barn, has a single bay. All the openings have been altered. Inside No. 1 is a timber-framed partition. | II |
| Ha-ha; 53.65938°N 2.77215°W | — | Early 18th century (probable) | The ha-ha is in the garden of the Rectory and forms its southern border. It is constructed in stone and runs along a long concave curved line. | II |
| Sundial; 53.65943°N 2.77191°W | — | Early 18th century (probable) | The sundial is in the garden of the Rectory. It is in stone, and consists of a vase-shaped pedestal on which are a worn plate and a scrolled gnomon. | II |
| Fishery Bridge; 53.66079°N 2.78150°W | | Early to mid 18th century | The bridge carries the A581 road over the River Yarrow. It is in sandstone, and consists of a single segmental arch. The bridge has voussoirs, a string band, and a humped parapet with wing walls ending in capped pilasters, and saddleback coping. | II |
| Great Hanging Bridge; 53.65558°N 2.80872°W | | Early to mid 18th century (probable) | The bridge carries Meadow Lane (A581 road) over a new cut of the River Douglas. It is in sandstone and consists of three elliptical arches with triple keystones, rounded cutwaters, and pilastered piers. | II |
| Hanging Bridge Farmhouse; 53.65478°N 2.81192°W | — | Early to mid 18th century | A former farmhouse in pebbledashed brick with a slate roof. It has two storeys, and an almost symmetrical two-bay front. On the front is a gabled porch that has a rounded arch with a keystone. There are two segmental-headed casement windows with lattice glazing on each floor. | II |
| Barn, Bridge End Farm; 53.65549°N 2.81223°W | — | 18th century | The barn is in brick with a slate roof, and has four bays. On the south side is a segmental-headed wagon entrance. The barn also contains altered windows, blocked ventilation slits, and an inserted garage door. | II |
| 1 Church Street; 53.66019°N 2.77358°W | — | Mid 18th century (probable) | A brick house with a slate roof, it has an L-shaped plan, with two storeys and two bays, the right bay projecting forward. There is a doorway in the angle. One window is fixed, and the others are casements. On the right side are two blocked openings. | II |
| Gateway to Rectory; 53.66008°N 2.77140°W | | 18th century (probable) | The gateway is in sandstone and consists of three arches, the middle one broken. The outer arches have ogee heads with traces of windows above. They appear ruinous, possibly deliberately. | II |
| 57 Town Road; 53.66055°N 2.77385°W | — | Late 18th century (probable) | A brick house with a stone-slate roof, it has an L-shaped plan, with two storeys, a three-bay front, and a rear wing. The doorway has fluted pilasters and a triangular head. The windows are sashes, those in the upper floor having keystones. There is a porch on the right side in the angle of the protruding rear wing. | II |
| 59 and 61 Town Road; 53.66047°N 2.77367°W | — | Late 18th century | A pair of cottages, one later used as a shop, in brick with a stone-slate roof. They have two storeys, and each cottage has a one-bay front. No. 59 has a shop front in the ground floor. The other windows are casements imitating sashes. | II |
| 63 and 65 Town Road; 53.66040°N 2.77351°W | — | Late 18th century (probable) | Two brick houses with a slate roof in two storeys. No. 65 has two bays and a central round-headed doorway with a triple keystone. No. 63 has one bay and a segmental-headed doorway to the left. All the windows are sashes. At the rear of No. 63 is a hoist canopy. | II |
| The Grapes Hotel; 53.66033°N 2.77336°W | | Late 18th century | The public house was extended in the 19th century. It is in rendered brick with stone dressings and has roofs partly in slate and partly tiled. The building has two storeys, and the 19th-century part faces the road with a symmetrical three-bay front including a central doorway and sash windows. Behind is a long 18th-century wing in three bays, with windows of varying types. | II |
| The Lodge, Grape Lane; 53.66015°N 2.77031°W | — | Late 18th century | A brick house, the front painted, with a slate roof. It has two storeys with attics, and a symmetrical five-bay front. In the centre is a porch with two Tuscan columns, two half-columns, and a flat cornice. The windows on the front are segmental-headed sashes. To the left is lower two-storey extension, and at the rear is a stair window and a latrine turret. | II |
| Yarrow Cottage; 53.65895°N 2.77336°W | — | c. 1800 | A house in roughcast brick with a hipped slate roof, it has two storeys and is symmetrical with three bays on each side. There are service extensions at the rear and on the left side. The central doorway has a semicircular fanlight, and the windows are sashes. On the right side is a small bay window. | II |
| Jubilee Almshouses; 53.66056°N 2.78129°W | — | 1809 | Four almshouses in painted brick on a stuccoed stone base with a hipped slate roof. The almshouses have a symmetrical front, they are in a single storey, with the roof carried down as a verandah at the front and sides. In the centre is a pedimented gable. | II |
| 3, 5, 7, 9 and 11 Church Street; 53.65994°N 2.77355°W | | Early 19th century (probable) | A row of five brick cottages with slate roofs. They are in two storeys, No. 7 has two bays and the other cottages have one bay each. Most of the windows are sashes. | II |
| 4, 6, 8 and 10 Church Street; 53.65996°N 2.77334°W | — | Early 19th century | A row of four brick cottages with slate roofs in two storeys, with doorways approached by three steps. Nos. 6, 8 and 10 have cellars, Nos. 4 and 10 have sash windows, and Nos. 6 and 8 have casement windows. | II |
| 38 and 38A Drinkhouse Lane; 53.65833°N 2.77935°W | — | Early 19th century | Originally one house, later divided into two, in red and yellow brick with a tiled roof. There are two storeys, and each house has a single-bay front. In the centre are paired doorways with Tuscan architraves including engaged columns with fluted entablatures, dentilled open pediments, and semicircular fanlights. There are four windows, three are sashes and the other is a casement. Above the doorways is a blind window decorated with a rhombus. | II |
| 21 and 23 Grape Lane; 53.65914°N 2.76997°W | — | Early 19th century | A pair of brick houses with a slate roof, in three storeys and four bays. No. 21 has a gabled porch, a semicircular fanlight, and sash windows. No. 23 has a round-headed doorways and varied windows. | II |
| 73 Town Road; 53.66026°N 2.77283°W | — | Early 19th century | A brick house with a stone-slate roof in two storeys with a symmetrical two-bay front. The central doorway has a wooden doorcase with a pediment, and the windows are sashes with stone sills and heads. | II |
| Smithy; 53.66010°N 2.77358°W | | Early 19th century (probable) | The former smithy is in brick with a slate roof. It is a small building with a rectangular plan in a single storey. At the left end is a full height door, there is another door in the centre, and a pair of windows to the right. | II |
| School; 53.65939°N 2.77363°W | | 1827 | The school is in sandstone with slate roofs and is in Tudor style. It is in three parts canted around the edge of the churchyard. The main block has two storeys and three bays with a central archway. To the left is a single-storey wing; both these parts have mullioned windows. The right wing has two storeys and contains windows with altered glazing and two datestones. | II |
| Croston Station Bridge; 53.66779°N 2.77767°W | | c. 1846 | The bridge was built for the Liverpool, Ormskirk and Preston Railway to carry Bretherton Road (B5247 road) over its line. It is in sandstone, and consists of a single elliptical arch with a span of about 8.8 metres (29 ft). The bridge has voussoirs, a chamfered string band, capped parapets, and pilaster strip abutments. | II |
| 16 Church Street; 53.65975°N 2.77331°W | — | Mid 19th century (probable) | A brick house with stone dressings and a hipped slate roof. It has two storeys and two bays. To the left is a doorway with a stone doorcase, and to the left of this is a partly blocked doorway containing a window. There are two windows in each floor containing replaced casements. The doorway and windows have hood moulds. | II |
| The Lodge, Highfield Road; 53.66148°N 2.76603°W | — | Mid 19th century | Built as the lodge to Croston Hall (now demolished) and attributed to E. W. Pugin. It is in Gothic style, constructed in red brick with stone dressings, and has a blue tile roof with decorative banding and crested ridge tiles. The lodge has a T-shaped plan, consisting of a two-storey main range and a single-storey service wing at the rear. There are two bays on the front, and a porch with a decorated gablet. The windows have arched heads, and in the south front is a bay window, a sash window, a gable with bargeboards, and a finial. | II |
| Holy Cross Chapel; 53.65642°N 2.76926°W | | 1857 | Built as a private chapel for Croston Hall, and designed by E. W. Pugin, it has since been used as a Roman Catholic church. The chapel is in sandstone with a slate roof, and is in eclectic Gothic style. It is a small building, consisting of a nave, a west porch, a chancel, and offices on the north side. On the west gable is a three-stage bellcote. | II |
| Agricultural shelter and stable 53.64500°N 2.78541°W | | Mid to late 19th century | The building has been used as a shelter and then converted into a stable. It is a small building in red brick with a slate roof, and has one storey and a rectangular plan. There is a single entrance, and some stable fittings have been retained. | II |
| Jubilee Almshouses (continuation); 53.66027°N 2.78144°W | — | 1870 | A row of three brick almshouses in a single storey. They have a hipped slate roof carried down to form a verandah carried on cast iron posts along the front. On the front are three doorways and four windows, all segmental-headed, the windows being casements. Also on the front is an inscribed stone plaque. | II |
| 12 and 14 Church Street; 53.65983°N 2.77333°W | — | Late 19th century | A pair of brick cottages with slate roofs, in two storeys. The doorways are at the outer ends, and approached up two steps. There is a sash window in each floor. All the openings have arched heads, those in the upper floor breaking through the eaves and gabled. | II |
| War memorial 53.66015°N 2.77115°W | | 1920 | The war memorial stands in an enclosure at a road junction. It is in granite, and consists of a wheel-head cross with a shaft on a tapering plinth on a two-stepped base. The front of the cross and the shaft are carved with Celtic knot decoration and dates. There is an inscription on the base of the shaft, and the names of those lost in the First World War are on the sides of the plinth. On the base are plaques with a further inscription and the names of those lost in the Second World War. | II |
| Telephone kiosk 53.66222°N 2.77506°W | — | 1935 | A K6 type telephone kiosk, designed by Giles Gilbert Scott. Constructed in cast iron with a square plan and a dome, it has three unperforated crowns in the top panels. | II |
