= Wyre Borough Council elections =

Class of election in the United Kingdom

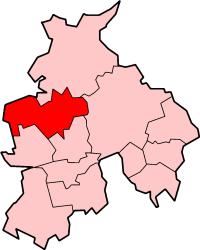
Wyre shown within the non-metropolitan county of Lancashire (Unitary authorities excluded)

Wyre Borough Council elections are held every four years. Wyre Borough Council is the local authority for the non-metropolitan district of Wyre in Lancashire, England. Since the last boundary changes in 2015, 50 councillors have been elected from 24 wards.

== Council elections ==
- 1973 Wyre Borough Council election
- 1976 Wyre Borough Council election
- 1979 Wyre Borough Council election (New ward boundaries)
- 1983 Wyre Borough Council election
- 1987 Wyre Borough Council election
- 1991 Wyre Borough Council election
- 1995 Wyre Borough Council election
- 1999 Wyre Borough Council election
- 2003 Wyre Borough Council election (New ward boundaries reduced the number of seats by 1)
- 2007 Wyre Borough Council election
- 2011 Wyre Borough Council election
- 2015 Wyre Borough Council election (New ward boundaries)
- 2019 Wyre Borough Council election
- 2023 Wyre Borough Council election

== Election results ==
	Overall control	Conservative	Labour	UKIP	Lib Dems / Liberal	Independent	Other
2023	Conservative	30	17	-	-	3	-
2019	Conservative	37	9	4	-	-	-
2015	Conservative	36	14	-	-	-	-
2011	Conservative	40	15	-	-	-	-
2007	Conservative	45	9	-	1	-	-
2003	Conservative	33	21	-	1	-	-
1999	Conservative	34	20	-	2	-	-
1995	Labour	19	31	-	4	-	2
1991	Conservative	32	17	-	5	1	1
1987	Conservative	43	8	-	4	-	-
1983	Conservative	46	8	-	2	-	-
1979	Conservative	40	4	-	2	10	-
1976	Conservative	48	-	-	2	4	1
1973	Conservative	46	2	-	-	-	7

== Borough result maps ==
2003 results map

2007 results map

2011 results map

2015 results map

2019 results map

2023 results map

== By-election results ==
=== 1995-1999 ===
Rossall By-Election 13 June 1996
Party	Candidate	Votes	%	±%
Labour		771	52.7	
Conservative		605	41.3	
Liberal Democrats		88	6.0	
Majority		166	11.4	
Turnout		1,464	40.4	
Labour hold		Swing		

Pharos By-Election 14 August 1997
Party	Candidate	Votes	%	±%
Labour		525	59.7	+5.1
Conservative		354	40.3	+19.2
Majority		171	19.4	
Turnout		879	34.5	
Labour hold		Swing		

=== 1999-2003 ===
Warren By-Election 10 June 1999 (3)
Party	Candidate	Votes	%	±%
Labour		838	20.25	
Labour		821	19.84	
Labour		726	17.54	
Conservative		602	14.54	
Conservative		596	14.40	
Conservative		556	13.43	
Turnout			42.2	
Labour hold		Swing		
Labour hold		Swing		
Labour hold		Swing		

Norcross By-Election 28 June 2001
Party	Candidate	Votes	%	±%
Conservative		510	55.4	−3.4
Labour		410	44.6	+3.4
Majority		100	10.8	
Turnout		920	27.0	
Conservative hold		Swing		

=== 2003-2007 ===
Warren By-Election 5 May 2005
Party	Candidate	Votes	%	±%
Labour	Malcolm Ratcliffe	1,414	54.9	−5.7
Conservative	Carole Bonham	943	36.6	−2.8
UKIP	James Orange	219	8.5	+8.5
Majority		471	18.3	
Turnout		2,576		
Labour hold		Swing		

Park By-Election 18 May 2006
Party	Candidate	Votes	%	±%
Conservative	Margaret Birkett	560	55.1	+27.2
Labour	Julie Grunshaw	456	44.9	−27.2
Majority		104	10.2	
Turnout		1,016	32.0	
Conservative gain from Labour		Swing		

=== 2007-2011 ===
Victoria By-Election 7 February 2008
Party	Candidate	Votes	%	±%
Conservative	Patsy Ormrod	769	51.9	−10.1
Labour	Billy Glasgow	339	22.9	+1.1
BNP	James Clayton	222	15.0	+15.0
UKIP	Roy Hopwood	151	10.2	−6.0
Majority		430	29.0	
Turnout		1,481		
Conservative hold		Swing		

Great Eccleston By-Election 19 June 2008
Party	Candidate	Votes	%	±%
Conservative	Sue Catterall	778	67.8	−32.2
Independent	Jim Proctor	309	26.9	+26.9
Liberal Democrats	Chandos Elletson	60	5.2	+5.2
Majority		469	40.9	
Turnout		1,481	39.9	
Conservative hold		Swing		

Jubilee By-Election 22 October 2009
Party	Candidate	Votes	%	±%
Conservative	David Walmsley	492	38.3	+4.2
UKIP	Roy Hopwood	345	26.9	−4.8
Labour	Wayne Martin	331	25.8	+0.7
BNP	James Clayton	116	9.0	+9.0
Majority		147	11.4	
Turnout		1,284	37.0	
Conservative hold		Swing		

Tithebarn By-Election 7 October 2010
Party	Candidate	Votes	%	±%
Conservative	Lesley Ann McKay	847	73.4	+0.6
Labour	Alan Morgan	307	26.6	−0.6
Majority		540	46.79	
Turnout		1154	34.91%	
Conservative hold		Swing		

=== 2011-2015 ===
Park By-Election 2 May 2013
Party	Candidate	Votes	%	±%
Labour	Brian Stephenson	502	64.5	+6.5
Conservative	James McConnachie	276	35.5	−6.5
Majority		226	29.0	
Turnout		778		
Labour hold		Swing		

Pharos By-Election 2 May 2013
Party	Candidate	Votes	%	±%
Labour	Evelyn Stephenson	618	64.6	−6.9
Conservative	Dave Shaw	339	35.4	+6.9
Majority		279	29.2	
Turnout		957		
Labour hold		Swing		

Staina By-Election 2 May 2013
Party	Candidate	Votes	%	±%
Conservative	Kerry Jones	974	64.8	−3.2
Labour	Eddie Rawlings	528	35.2	+3.2
Majority		446	29.7	
Turnout		1,502		
Conservative hold		Swing		

Hardhorn By-Election 22 May 2014
Party	Candidate	Votes	%	±%
Conservative	Colette Birch	828	68.0	−5.1
Labour	Christopher Frist	390	32.0	+5.1
Majority		438	36.0	
Turnout		1,218		
Conservative hold		Swing		

=== 2015-2019 ===
Bourne By-Election 4 May 2017
Party	Candidate	Votes	%	±%
Conservative	Emma Ellison	788	52.9	+18.3
Labour	Joanne Cooper	621	41.7	+10.7
Green	Barbara Mead-Mason	81	5.4	−5.6
Majority		167	11.2	
Turnout		1,490		
Conservative gain from Labour		Swing		

Bourne By-Election 12 October 2017
Party	Candidate	Votes	%	±%
Labour	Cheryl Raynor	610	50.1	+11.6
Conservative	Maggie Pattinson	427	35.1	+5.0
Independent	Brian Crawford	180	14.8	+14.8
Majority		183	15.0	
Turnout		1,217		
Labour hold		Swing		

Preesall By-Election 11 January 2018
Party	Candidate	Votes	%	±%
Conservative	Peter Cartridge	930	55.3	−9.7
Labour	Nic Fogg	753	44.7	+9.7
Majority		177	10.5	
Turnout		1,683		
Conservative hold		Swing		

=== 2019-2023 ===
Cleveleys Park By-Election 30 June 2022
Party	Candidate	Votes	%	±%
Conservative	Richard Rendell	721	53.7	−9.0
Labour	Wayne Martin	621	46.3	+9.0
Majority		100	7.5	
Turnout		1,342		
Conservative hold		Swing		

Preesall By-Election 18 August 2022
Party	Candidate	Votes	%	±%
Independent	Collette Rushforth	595	39.5	+39.5
Conservative	Steven Taylor-Royston	495	32.8	−29.9
Labour	William Jackson	315	20.9	−16.4
Independent	Garry Wright	102	6.8	+6.8
Majority		100	6.6	
Turnout		1,507		
Independent gain from Conservative		Swing		

=== 2023-2027 ===
Marsh Mill By-Election 7 November 2024
Party	Candidate	Votes	%	±%
Reform	James Crawford	567	38.6	
Conservative	Howard Ballard	449	30.6	
Labour	James Mason	400	27.2	
Green	Caroline Montague	52	3.5	
Majority		118	8.0	
Turnout		1,468		
Reform gain from Conservative		Swing		

Park By-Election 1 May 2025
Party	Candidate	Votes	%	±%
Reform	Alice Jones	534	58.1	
Labour	Rachel Wilkinson	229	24.9	
Conservative	JJ Fitzgerald	156	17.0	
Majority		305	33.2	
Turnout		919		
Reform gain from Labour		Swing		
