= Listed buildings in Pilling =

Pilling is a civil parish in the Wyre district of Lancashire, England. It contains seven buildings that are recorded in the National Heritage List for England as designated listed buildings. Of these, two are at Grade II*, the middle grade, and the others are at Grade II, the lowest grade. The parish includes the village of Pilling, the hamlet of Stake Pool and the surrounding countryside. The listed buildings comprise two farmhouses, two churches, a house, a hotel and a boundary stone.

== Key ==
| Grade | Criteria |
|---|---|
| II* | Particularly important buildings of more than special interest |
| II | Buildings of national importance and special interest |

== Buildings ==
| Name and location | Photograph | Date | Notes | Grade |
|---|---|---|---|---|
| Bell's Farmhouse; 53.91986°N 2.89759°W | — | c. 1700 | The farmhouse is pebbledashed and has a thatched roof covered in corrugated iron. It has two storeys and three bays. The windows are sashes with plain reveals. | II |
| Old St John the Baptist's Church; 53.92898°N 2.91109°W | | 1717 | The church, now redundant, is in red sandstone with a plinth, quoins and other dressings in grey sandstone. It has a slate roof, and is in Georgian style. The church has five bays with round-headed windows on the south side, and two tiers of windows on the north, the upper tier being lunettes. At the west end the doorway has carved imposts, and an inscribed keystone, above which is a plaque containing a sundial and an inscription. On the gable is a bellcote. Inside the church are galleries on two sides and three box pews. | II* |
| The Olde Ship; 53.92858°N 2.90962°W | | Early 19th century | A brick house with stone dressings and a slate roof in two storeys. It has a symmetrical three-bay front with chamfered quoins and a moulded cornice. The windows are sashes with stone sills and lintel with false voussoirs and keystones. The doorway has a fanlight with an elliptical head, and attached Doric columns carrying an open pediment. | II |
| Pilling Hall Farmhouse; 53.93436°N 2.88540°W | — | Early 19th century | A sandstone house with a slate roof in two storeys and with a symmetrical front of three bays. The windows are sashes with plain surrounds and the doorway has an architrave with a moulded cornice. | II |
| Springfield House Hotel; 53.93259°N 2.92178°W | | Early 19th century | Originally a house, later used as a hotel, it is in sandstone with a hipped roof. There are two storeys and a south front of three bays, with corner pilasters, a plinth, and a cornice with a blank frieze and a blocking course. The central bay projects forward and contains a porch with Tuscan columns and an entablature. The west front has four bays. | II |
| St John the Baptist's Church; 53.93031°N 2.91062°W | | 1886–67 | The church was designed by Paley and Austin in Gothic Revival style. It is in sandstone with a slate roof, and consists of a west steeple, a nave with a clerestory, aisles, a south porch, a north transept containing a vestry and organ chamber, and a chancel. The steeple has a tower with angle buttresses, and a parapet with a flushwork band, and on the top is a recessed spire. The west window has eight lights, and the east window has five lights containing free Perpendicular tracery. | II* |
| Boundary stone 53.92840°N 2.87382°W | — | Undated | The boundary stone is in gritstone, and consists of a post with chamfered corners, about 1.5 metres (4 ft 11 in) high. Its head is inscribed with "P.P.". | II |
