= Scronkey =

Hamlet in Lancashire, England

Coordinates: 53.917°N 2.897°W

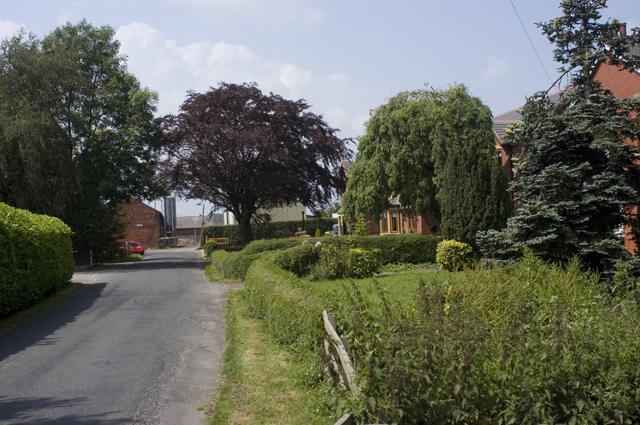
- Scronkey

- Shown within Wyre Borough Shown on the Fylde Location within Lancashire
- OS grid reference: SD410471
- Civil parish: Pilling
- District: Wyre
- Shire county: Lancashire
- Region: North West
- Country: England
- Sovereign state: United Kingdom
- Post town: PRESTON
- Postcode district: PR3
- Dialling code: 01253
- Police: Lancashire
- Fire: Lancashire
- Ambulance: North West
- UK Parliament: Lancaster and Wyre

Scronkey is a small rural hamlet in the county of Lancashire, England. It is in the Over Wyre region of the Fylde, west of Garstang near Pilling.

The combined population of Scronkey and Eagland Hill was 272 in 2001.
