= 2011 Wyre Borough Council election =

2011 UK local government election

Map of the results of the 2011 Wyre council election. Conservatives in blue and Labour in red.

Elections to Wyre Borough Council were held on 5 May 2011, along with the 2011 United Kingdom Alternative Vote referendum. All 55 councillors were elected from 26 wards in elections held every four years. The Conservative Party stayed in overall control of the council.

The Local Government Boundary Commission for England reviewed the electoral wards of Wyre Borough Council in 2014 with the new electoral map to be elected for the first time at the 2015 Wyre Borough Council election.

Following the election, the composition of the council is now as follows:

Party	Seats	±
Conservative	40	–5
Labour	15	+7
Liberal Democrat	0	–1
Independent	0	–1

== Election result ==
Wyre Borough Council Election, 2011
Party	Seats	Gains	Losses	Net gain/loss	Seats %	Votes %	Votes	+/−
Conservative	40	1	6	–5	72.73	60.23	45,140	-3.62%
Labour	15	7	0	+7	27.27	35.13	26,331	+6.78%
UKIP	0	0	0	0	0	2.53	1,894	+0.28%
Independent	0	0	1	–1	0	1.46	1,095	+1.46%
Green	0	0	0	0	0	0.65	485	+0.65%
Liberal Democrats	0	0	1	–1	0	0	0	-4.85%

== Ward results ==
=== Bourne ===
Bourne (3 Councillors)
Party	Candidate	Votes	%	±%
Labour	Terry Lees	1,013	18.29	+4.022
Conservative	Don Macnaughton	942	17.01	−2.57
Conservative	Julie Vanessa Newsham	912	16.47	–3.08
Labour	Sean Hazlewood	901	16.27	+2.14
Conservative	Christopher Robert McConnachie	894	16.14	−2.42
Labour	Kevin Ronald Hogginson	876	15.82	+1.90
Turnout		5,538	40.2	
Labour gain from Conservative		Swing	+6.59	
Conservative hold		Swing	-4.57	
Conservative hold		Swing	-4.77	

=== Breck ===
Breck (2 Councillors)
Party	Candidate	Votes	%	±%
Conservative	Peter Gibson	761	40.39	+3.64
Conservative	David John Henderson	758	40.23	+1.88
Labour	Richard Hobson	365	19.37	+6.02
Turnout		1,884	42.9	–11.13
Conservative hold		Swing	-4.17	
Conservative hold		Swing	-4.14	

=== Brock ===
Brock (1 Councillor)
Party	Candidate	Votes	%	±%
Conservative	Pete Murphy	Unopposed	N/A	N/A
Majority		N/A	N/A	N/A
Turnout		N/A	N/A	N/A
Conservative hold		Swing		

=== Cabus ===
Cabus (1 Councillor)
Party	Candidate	Votes	%	±%
Conservative	Robert William Brooks	444	70.48	–5.24
Labour	Faron Stuart Young	186	29.52	+5.24
Majority		258	40.95	–10.66
Turnout		630	48.3	+1.29
Conservative hold		Swing	-10.48	

=== Calder ===
Calder (1 Councillor)
Party	Candidate	Votes	%	±%
Conservative	David Williams	535	75.35	+9.04
UKIP	Simon Noble	175	24.65	N/A
Majority		360	50.70	+18.08
Turnout		710		
Conservative hold		Swing		

=== Carleton ===
Carleton (2 Councillors)
Party	Candidate	Votes	%	±%
Conservative	James Hargeaves	914	31.94	–3.50
Conservative	May Gandhi	905	31.62	–2.67
Labour	Andy Walker	556	19.43	+4.80
Labour	Frank William Turner	487	17.02	+1.38
Turnout		2,862	46.6	
Conservative hold		Swing	-7.29	
Conservative hold		Swing	-5.06	

=== Catterall ===
Catterall (1 Councillor)
Party	Candidate	Votes	%	±%
Conservative	Dave Swift	Unopposed	N/A	N/A
Majority		N/A	N/A	N/A
Turnout		N/A	N/A	N/A
Conservative gain from Liberal Democrats		Swing		

=== Cleveleys Park ===
Cleveleys Park (3 Councillors)
Party	Candidate	Votes	%	±%
Conservative	Andrea Kay	1,210	19.01	−0.20
Conservative	Rita Amos	1,102	17.31	+0.33
Labour	Penny Martin	1,077	16.92	+1.05
Conservative	Tony Morley	1,068	16.78	+0.35
Labour	David Oxley	978	15.36	+0.57
Labour	John Damien Traynor	931	14.63	+0.56
Turnout		6,366	48.7	+13.6
Conservative hold		Swing	+0.31	
Conservative hold		Swing	0.49	
Labour gain from Conservative		Swing	+0.70	

=== Garstang ===
Garstang (3 Councillors)
Party	Candidate	Votes	%	±%
Conservative	Dulcie Mary Atkins	1,272	30.29	+3.06
Conservative	Alice Collinson	1,223	29.12	+4.56
Conservative	Tom Balmain	1,073	25.56	+3.96
Labour	Marilyn Levey	632	15.05	N/A
Turnout		4,200	48.6	–14.02
Conservative hold		Swing	+2.52	
Conservative hold		Swing	+1.61	
Conservative hold		Swing	+1.01	

=== Great Eccleston ===
Great Eccleston (2 Councillors)
Party	Candidate	Votes	%	±%
Conservative	Susan Catteral	1,089	49.93	N/A
Conservative	Susan Pimbley	824	37.78	N/A
Labour	Al Davies	268	12.29	N/A
Turnout		2,181	48.6	N/A
Conservative hold		Swing	N/A	
Conservative hold		Swing	N/A	

=== Hambleton & Stalmine-with-Staynall ===
Hambleton & Stalmine-with-Staynall (2 Councillors)
Party	Candidate	Votes	%	±%
Conservative	Julie Robinson	1,055	42.29	+1.85
Conservative	Lynn Bowen	966	38.72	+2.74
Labour	Andy Meredith	474	19.00	+6.11
Turnout		2,495	46.7	
Conservative hold		Swing	-4.26	
Conservative hold		Swing	-5.67	

=== Hardhorn ===
Hardhorn (2 Councillors)
Party	Candidate	Votes	%	±%
Conservative	Simon Bridge	1,049	43.01	+5.44
Conservative	Graeme Cocker	1,003	41.12	+1.73
Labour	Richard Thomas Anyon	387	15.87	+4.09
Turnout				
Conservative hold		Swing	+0.83	
Conservative hold		Swing	-2.36	

=== Highcross ===
Highcross (2 Councillors)
Party	Candidate	Votes	%	±%
Conservative	Barry Birch	880	38.33	+1.08
Conservative	Roger Berry	876	38.15	+1.81
Labour	Chris Frost	540	23.52	+8.88
Turnout		2,296	49.8	–19.78
Conservative hold		Swing	-7.80	
Conservative hold		Swing	-9.94	

=== Jubilee ===
Jubilee (2 Councillors)
Party	Candidate	Votes	%	±%
Conservative	John Hodgkinson	602	21.90	+4.40
Conservative	David John Walmsley	563	20.48	+2.29
Labour	Bill Glasgow	486	17.68	+4.32
Labour	Alan Morgan	462	16.81	+6.28
UKIP	Roy Graham Hopwood	384	13.97	–2.91
UKIP	Alan Southern	252	9.17	−5.64
Turnout		2,749	46.4	
Conservative hold		Swing	+3.60	
Conservative hold		Swing	+2.36	

=== Mount ===
Mount (2 Councillors)
Party	Candidate	Votes	%	±%
Labour	Ruth Duffy	617	31.27	+2.59
Labour	Ian Duffy	603	30.56	+2.87
Conservative	David Jones	317	16.07	−6.04
Conservative	Kerry Jones	259	13.13	−8.39
Independent	Bob Jones	177	8.97	N/A
Turnout		1,973	31.6	–2.62
Labour hold		Swing	+9.03	
Labour hold		Swing	+7.92	

=== Norcross ===
Norcross (2 Councillors)
Party	Candidate	Votes	%	±%
Conservative	Ron Greenhough	664	27.56	–5.85
Conservative	Ann Margaret Turner	641	26.61	–4.27
Labour	June Jackson	568	23.58	+5.31
Labour	Peter Geoffrey Smith	536	22.25	+4.81
Turnout		2,409	41	+10.86
Conservative hold		Swing	-11.16	
Conservative hold		Swing	-9.08	

=== Park ===
Park (2 Councillors)
Party	Candidate	Votes	%	±%
Labour	Julie Elizabeth Grunshaw	694	30.29	+5.07
Labour	Christine Smith	674	29.42	+6.85
Conservative	Margaret Bond	503	21.96	−5.96
Conservative	James Robert McConnachie	420	18.33	−5.96
Turnout		2,291	40.5	+12.41
Labour hold		Swing	+7.40	
Labour gain from Conservative		Swing	+12.81	

=== Pharos ===
Pharos (3 Councillors)
Party	Candidate	Votes	%	±%
Labour	Clive Grunshaw	919	25.42	+5.20
Labour	Lorraine Beavers	893	24.70	+4.51
Labour	Ronald Shewan	825	22.82	+4.28
Conservative	David Charles Shaw	366	10.13	−2.86
Conservative	Ian McAllister Nicholson	343	9.49	−3.11
Conservative	Alexander Tomlinson	269	7.44	−2.25
Turnout		3,615	34.6	
Labour hold		Swing	+8.06	
Labour hold		Swing	+7.62	
Labour hold		Swing	+6.53	

=== Pilling ===
Pilling (1 Councillor)
Party	Candidate	Votes	%	±%
Conservative	Donald William Lawrenson	523	63.39	+5.12
Green	Sue White	173	20.97	N/A
Labour	Darrell Stratford Jackson	129	15.64	N/A
Majority		350	42.42	+25.89
Turnout		825	47	+11.79
Conservative hold		Swing	+25.88	

=== Preesall ===
Preesall (3 Councillors)
Party	Candidate	Votes	%	±%
Conservative	Gordon McCain	1,299	26.34	–0.68
Conservative	Vivien Taylor	1,226	24.86	–2.27
Conservative	Paul Moon	1,220	24.74	–3.02
Labour	Nic Fogg	656	13.30	+4.92
UKIP	Christopher Steven Lamb	530	10.75	N/A
Turnout		4,931	47.8	
Conservative hold		Swing	-5.60	
Conservative hold		Swing	-3.31	
Conservative hold		Swing	-4.06	

=== Rossall ===
Rossall (3 Councillors)
Party	Candidate	Votes	%	±%
Labour	Terry Rogers	841	16.23	−1.93
Labour	Ted Taylor	801	15.45	−0.75
Labour	Rita Hewitt	758	14.62	−2.75
Conservative	Marlene Colby	698	13.47	−3.90
Conservative	Michelle Riley	684	13.29	−0.58
Conservative	Keith Riley	655	12.64	−5.52
UKIP	David Gerrard	320	6.17	−2.49
UKIP	Jimmy Orange	233	4.50	N/A
Independent	Jack Harrison	193	3.72	N/A
Turnout		5,183	40.7	
Labour hold		Swing	-1.51	
Labour hold		Swing	-0.17	
Labour hold		Swing	-1.52	

=== Staina ===
Staina (3 Councillors)
Party	Candidate	Votes	%	±%
Conservative	Julia Anderson	1,445	26.58	−2.09
Conservative	Ian Perkin	1,336	24.58	−2.54
Conservative	Ramesh Gandhi	1,311	24.12	−2.81
Labour	Eddie Rawlings	679	12.49	+3.60
Labour	Jonjo O'Connell	665	12.23	+3.85
Turnout		5,436	45.5	
Conservative hold		Swing	-5.69	
Conservative hold		Swing	-6.39	
Conservative hold		Swing	-6.66	

=== Tithebarn ===
Tithebarn (2 Councillors)
Party	Candidate	Votes	%	±%
Conservative	David Bannister	928	35.29	−8.03
Conservative	Lesley McKay	902	34.30	−6.16
Labour	Liam Bromley	488	18.56	+2.34
Green	Jake Welsh	312	11.86	N/A
Turnout		2,630	46.8	
Conservative hold		Swing	-10.37	
Conservative hold		Swing	-1.80	

=== Victoria ===
Victoria (3 Councillors)
Party	Candidate	Votes	%	±%
Conservative	Patsy Anne Ormrod	1,379	26.42	−0.79
Conservative	Michael John Vincent	1,239	23.74	+0.28
Conservative	Alan Thomas Vincent	1,223	23.43	+0.27
Labour	Brian Michael Stephenson	713	13.66	+4.11
Labour	Evelyn Stephenson	665	12.74	+3.23
Turnout		5,219	44.7	
Conservative hold		Swing	-4.90	
Conservative hold		Swing	-2.95	
Conservative hold		Swing	-5.36	

=== Warren ===
Warren (3 Councillors)
Party	Candidate	Votes	%	±%
Labour	Marge Anderton	920	17.56	+0.64
Labour	Paul Treece-Birch	911	17.39	+2.73
Labour	Emma Victoria Anderton	896	17.10	+3.78
Conservative	Stan Leadbetter	714	13.63	−4.60
Conservative	Mike Sanderson	607	11.59	−8.17
Conservative	Bob Long	466	8.90	−8.20
Independent	Mark Hamer	389	7.43	N/A
Independent	Trisha Hogg	175	3.34	N/A
Independent	Belinda Ann Armstrong	161	3.07	N/A
Turnout		5,239		
Labour gain from Conservative		Swing	+8.81	
Labour gain from Conservative		Swing	+7.33	
Labour gain from Conservative		Swing	+11.98	

=== Wyresdale ===
Wyresdale (1 Councillors)
Party	Candidate	Votes	%	±%
Conservative	Val Wilson	592	69.40	−3.56
Labour	Ben Whittingham	261	30.60	+3.56
Majority		331	38.80	−7.12
Turnout		853		
Conservative hold		Swing	-7.12	
