= Old St John the Baptist's Church, Pilling =

Coordinates: 53.9290°N 2.9111°W

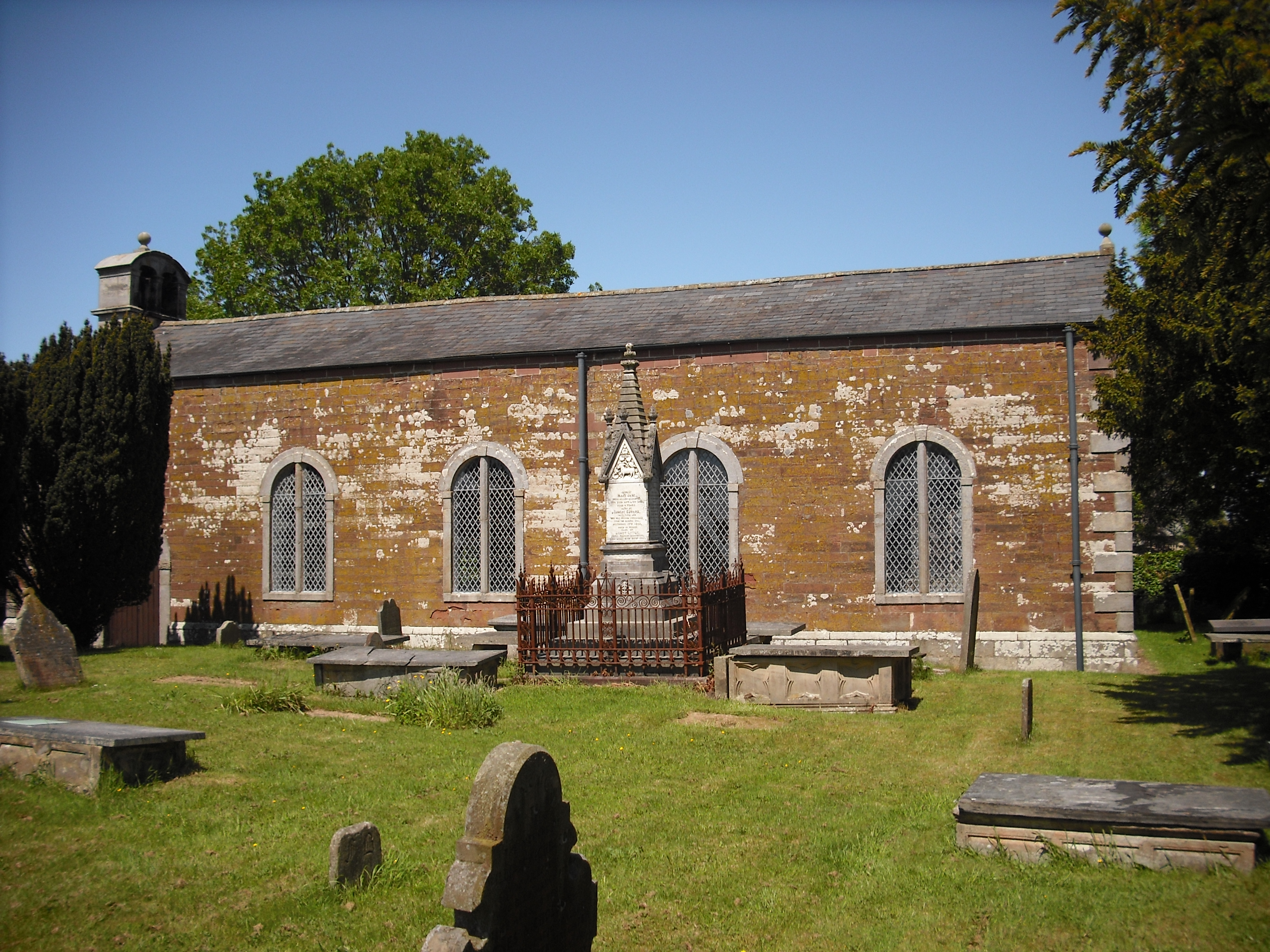
- Old St John the Baptist's Church, from the south

- Location in the Borough of Wyre
- OS grid reference: SD 403 485
- Location: Pilling, Lancashire
- Country: England
- Denomination: Anglican
- Website: Churches Conservation Trust

History
- Dedication: John the Baptist

Architecture
- Functional status: Redundant
- Heritage designation: Grade II*
- Designated: 17 April 1967
- Architectural type: Church
- Style: Georgian
- Completed: 1717 (altered 1813)

Specifications
- Materials: Sandstone, slate roof

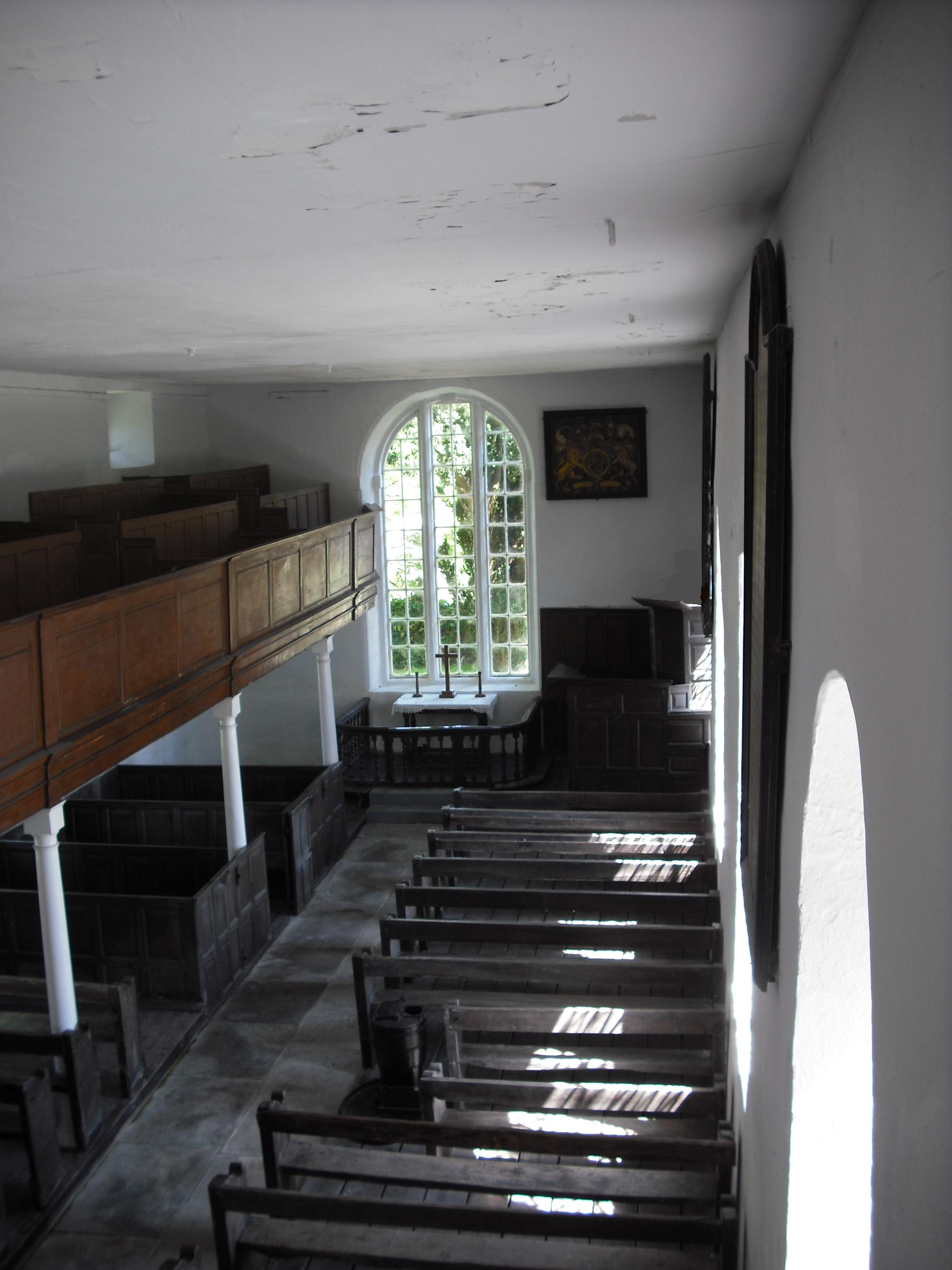
Church interior, looking towards pulpit

Old St John the Baptist's Church is a redundant Anglican church in the village of Pilling, Lancashire, England. It stands 160 yards (150 m) to the south of the new church, also dedicated to St John the Baptist. The church is "an unusual survival of a small Georgian church". It is recorded in the National Heritage List for England as a designated Grade II* listed building, and it is under the care of the Churches Conservation Trust.

== History ==
The village was originally served by a small medieval chapel (28 ft (8.5 m) by 19 ft 6 in (5.94 m)), serviced until the Dissolution by the canons of Cockersand Abbey. In 1716 the parishioners of Pilling petitioned the Bishop of Chester for a new church. In response, St John's was built in 1717. The only structural alteration since then was the raising of the walls in 1813 to accommodate galleries. It became redundant when the new church was built in 1887. The church was vested in the Trust on 1 August 1986. St John's is termed a chapel, rather than a church, due to its being a parochial chapelry in the parish of Garstang, served by a perpetual curate as opposed to a vicar.

== Architecture ==
=== Exterior ===
The church is constructed in red sandstone, with a plinth, chamfered quoins, and other dressings in grey sandstone. The roof is slate. It is a simple building, long and low. On the west gable is a double bellcote. The church has five bays. On the south front is a single row of windows with round heads and a single chamfered mullion. In the westernmost bay is a door over which is a smaller similar window, but with no mullion. The door has a keystone inscribed with the date 1717, over which is a sandstone sundial with a plaque including the date 1766. The east window is similar to the windows in the south wall, but with two mullions. The north wall has two tiers of five windows; the lower windows have flat lintels, and the upper row consists of lunette windows.

=== Interior ===
The interior has a flat plaster ceiling. The walls are whitewashed and the church is floored with stone flags. There are galleries on the north and west sides, carried on Tuscan-style columns, and on the ground floor there are fixed simple oak benches, box pews (one of which carries the date 1719), and a two-decker pulpit. The sandstone font dates from the 18th century and is in the shape of an urn. The Royal coat of arms of King George I dated 1719 are displayed in a hatchment. Before the alteration of the roof in 1813, the chapel was open to the rafters. The pulpit was originally three-tier and was located against the north wall.

== External features ==
The churchyard contains the war graves of two soldiers and a merchant sailor of World War I.

== See also ==
- Grade II* listed buildings in Lancashire
- Listed buildings in Pilling
- List of churches preserved by the Churches Conservation Trust in Northern England
