= The Olde Ship =

- The Old Ship; The Ship Inn
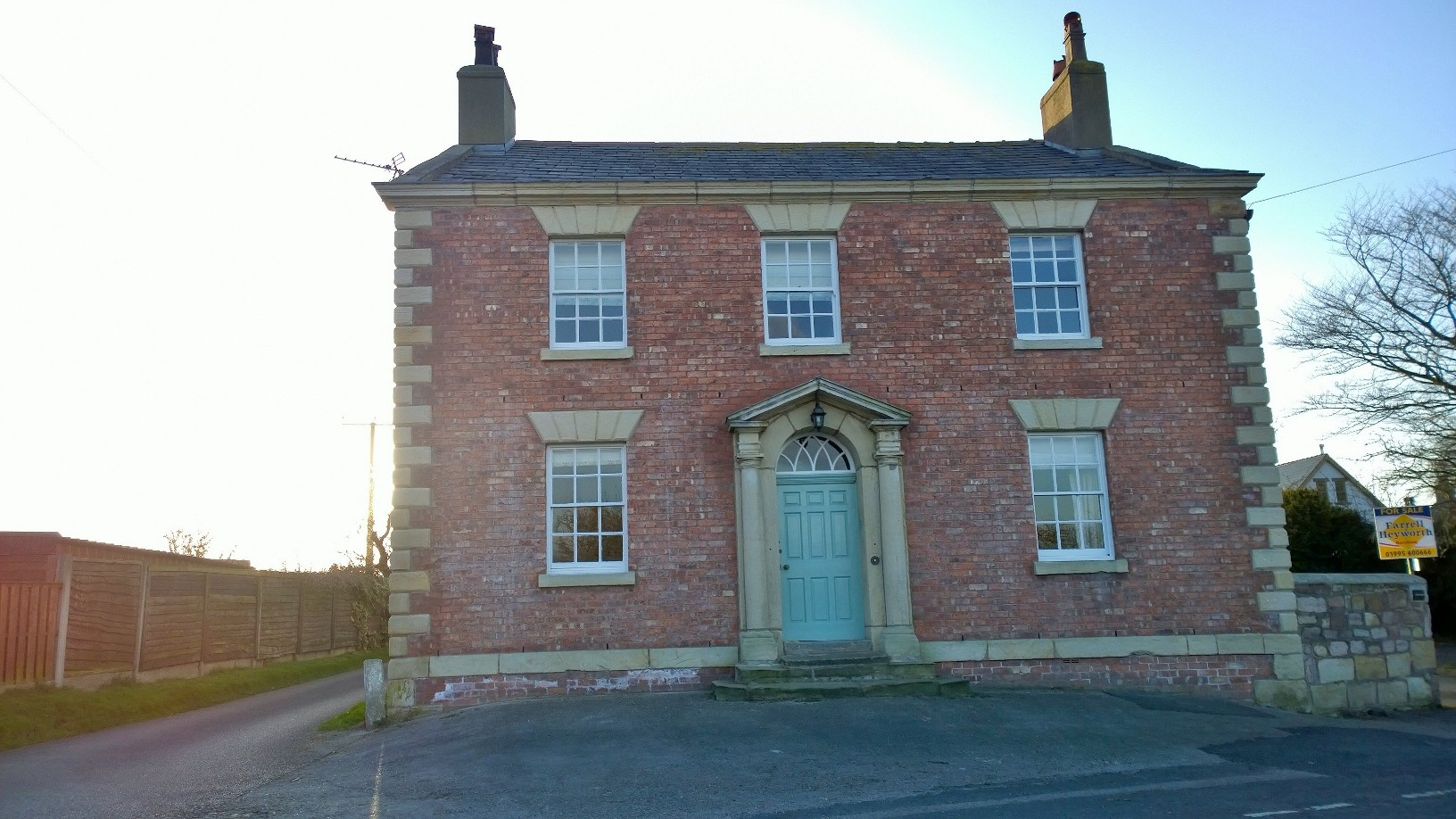
- The building in 2015, after its 2011 restoration to return brickwork to its façade

- Location within the Borough of Wyre Location within Lancashire
- 53.92898°N 2.91109°W
- Location: Pilling, Lancashire, England

History
- Built: 1782

Site notes
- Area: Borough of Wyre

Listed Building – Grade II
- Designated: 17 April 1967
- Reference no.: 1361882

The Olde Ship is a historic building in Pilling, Lancashire, England. It was built in 1782 for sea captain and slave trader George Dickinson (1732–1806), and has been designated a Grade II listed building by Historic England.

The building was used as a farmhouse, owned by a Mr Whiteside, in 1815, while William Armer was landlord, when the property was a public house, for 36 years, retiring in 1927 at the age of 68.

The village smithy adjoined the inn. It is now a private residence.

== See also ==
- Listed buildings in Pilling

== Sources ==
- Hartwell, Clare; Pevsner, Nikolaus (2009) [1969], Lancashire: North, The Buildings of England, New Haven and London: Yale University Press, ISBN 978-0-300-12667-9
- Historic England, "The Old Ship, Pilling (1361882)", National Heritage List for England
