= Ralph Slater =

English millwright

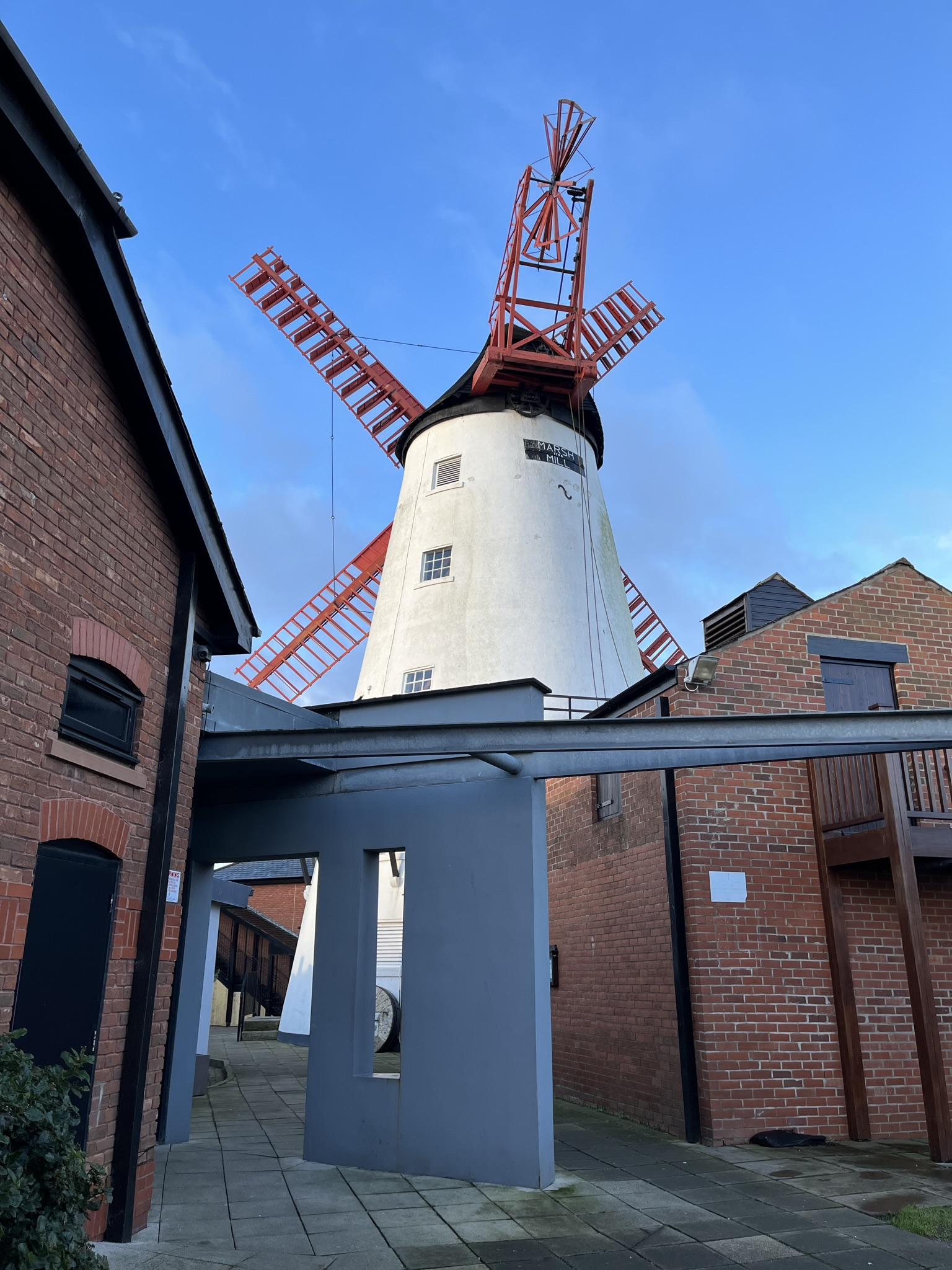
- Marsh Mill, built by Slater in 1794
- Born: 1754; Barton, Preston
- Died: 1830 (aged 75–76)
- Known for: Lancashire windmills

Ralph Slater (1754–1830) was an English millwright, active in the second half of the 18th century and early 19th, ostensibly known for his windmills on the Fylde in Lancashire, England. One of them, Marsh Mill, is a Grade II* listed building.

== Personal life ==
Slater was born in 1754 in Barton, Preston. He married Margery Speakman (1742–1814) on 25 April 1775. They had four children together and lived in Pilling.

He died in 1830, aged 75 or 76.

== Selected works ==
- Marsh Mill, Thornton (1794)
- Damside Windmill, Pilling (1808)
- Clifton Mill, Clifton
