= St John the Baptist's Church, Pilling =

Coordinates: 53.9303°N 2.9107°W

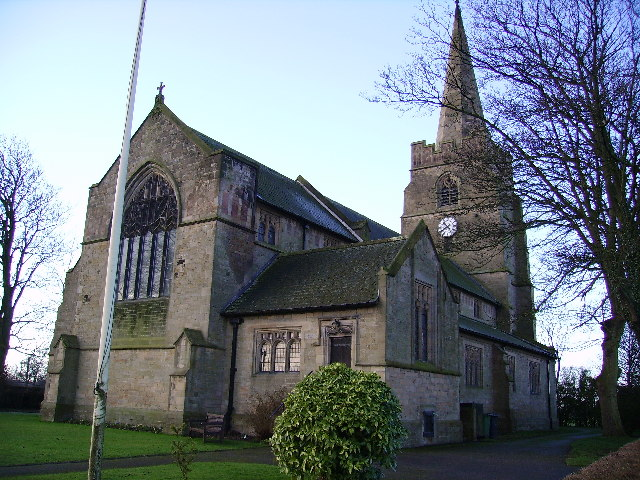
- St John the Baptist's Church, Pilling, from the northeast

- Location in the Borough of Wyre
- OS grid reference: SD 402,486
- Location: Pilling, Lancashire
- Country: England
- Denomination: Anglican
- Website: St John the Baptist, Pilling

History
- Status: Parish church
- Dedication: John the Baptist

Architecture
- Functional status: Active
- Heritage designation: Grade II*
- Designated: 17 April 1967
- Architect: Paley and Austin
- Architectural type: Church
- Style: Gothic Revival
- Groundbreaking: 1886
- Completed: 1887
- Construction cost: £7,000

Specifications
- Materials: Sandstone, slate roofs

Administration
- Province: York
- Diocese: Blackburn
- Archdeaconry: Lancaster
- Deanery: Garstang
- Parish: Stalmine, St James

St John the Baptist's Church is in the village of Pilling, Lancashire, England. It is an active Anglican parish church in the deanery of Garstang, the archdeaconry of Lancaster and the diocese of Blackburn. The church is recorded in the National Heritage List for England as a designated Grade II* listed building. Its benefice is combined with those of St James, Stalmine, and St Mark, Eagland Hill. It is described as "a fine example of the late Gothic Revival church with much originality in detail".

== History ==
The church was built in 1886–87 to replace the older Church of St John the Baptist on a site some 160 yards (150 m) to the north of the old church. It was designed by the Lancaster firm of Paley and Austin at a cost of £7,000 (equivalent to £800,000 in 2025), and provided seating for 410 people. Commenting on the church, the architectural historian Nikolaus Pevsner wrote "The fertility of Paley & Austin remains astonishing". In 1919–20 Henry Paley, of the same architectural practice, designed a 26 feet (8 m)-high war memorial for the churchyard.

== Architecture ==
=== Exterior ===
St John's is constructed in snecked sandstone rubble with slate roofs. Its plan consists of a five-bay nave with clerestory and north and south aisles, a south porch, a two-bay chancel with a north vestry forming a transept, a south organ chamber, and a west tower with a recessed spire. The tower has angle buttresses and a battlemented parapet. The parapet is decorated in flushwork, using mauve and beige sandstone, rather than the usual flushwork materials of flint and stone; this decoration is continued along the clerestory. In the top stage of the tower are two-light bell openings with pointed heads containing tracery. The west window has eight lights, and also has a pointed head containing tracery. The south porch is in two storeys and has angle buttresses; it is also decorated in flushwork. The aisle windows have three lights, and the east window has five lights with Perpendicular tracery.

=== Interior ===
Internally, the sandstone masonry is exposed and there is an open timber roof. The arcades are carried on octagonal piers. In the chancel is a double sedilia and a piscina. The stained glass in the east and west windows dates from the late 19th century. In the northwest aisle is a window depicting Saint Margaret made by E. H. Jewitt of Shrigley and Hunt in 1911, and in the south aisle is a window by A. L. Moore depicting Boaz, Ruth and Naomi. The two-manual organ was built in 1903, but its builder is uncertain. It was cleaned and restored in 1998 by David Wells of Liverpool. There is a ring of six bells, all cast by John Taylor & Co at various dates between 1934 and 1983.

== See also ==
- Grade II* listed buildings in Lancashire
- Listed buildings in Pilling
- List of ecclesiastical works by Paley and Austin
