= 2019 Wyre Borough Council election =

2019 UK local government election

Results of the 2019 Wyre Borough Council election

Council elections for the Borough of Wyre were held on 2 May 2019 as part of the 2019 United Kingdom local elections.

All locally registered electors (British, Irish, Commonwealth and European Union citizens) who are aged 18 or over on polling day are entitled to vote in the local elections.

== Results summary ==
The results of the 2019 elections are summarised below.

2019 Wyre Borough Council election
| Party | Seats | Gains | Losses | Net gain/loss | Seats % | Votes % | Votes | +/− |
|---|---|---|---|---|---|---|---|---|
| Conservative | 37 | 1 | 0 | ▲1 | 74.0 | 59.6 | 33,268 | |
| Labour | 9 | 0 | 5 | ▼5 | 18.0 | 30.9 | 17,280 | |
| UKIP | 4 | 4 | 0 | ▲4 | 8.0 | 2.9 | 1,618 | |
| Green | 0 | 0 | 0 | Steady | 0.0 | 3.7 | 2,063 | |
| Independent | 0 | 0 | 0 | Steady | 0.0 | 2.0 | 1,116 | |
| Liberal Democrats | 0 | 0 | 0 | Steady | 0.0 | 0.9 | 493 | |

== Ward results ==
=== Bourne ===
Bourne
| Party | Candidate | Votes | % | ±% |
|---|---|---|---|---|
| Conservative | Howard Ballard | 600 | 45.8 | |
| Conservative | Emma Ellison | 600 | 45.8 | |
| Labour | Holly Swales | 590 | 45.0 | |
| Labour | Terry Lees | 575 | 43.9 | |
| Conservative | Andy Walker | 550 | 42.0 | |
| Labour | Kevin Higginson | 531 | 40.5 | |
| Registered electors | | 4,816 | | |
| Turnout | | 1,311 | 27.2 | |
| Conservative hold | | | | |
| Conservative gain from Labour | | | | |
| Labour hold | | | | |

=== Breck ===
Breck
| Party | Candidate | Votes | % | ±% |
|---|---|---|---|---|
| Conservative | David Henderson | 495 | 46.0 | |
| Conservative | Peter Le Marinel | 445 | 41.4 | |
| Independent | Stephen Nicholls | 406 | 37.7 | |
| Independent | Peter Gibson | 396 | 36.8 | |
| Labour | Sean Hazelwood | 223 | 20.7 | |
| Registered electors | | 3,180 | | |
| Turnout | | 1,076 | 33.8 | |
| Conservative hold | | | | |
| Conservative hold | | | | |

=== Brock with Catterall ===
Brock with Catterall
| Party | Candidate | Votes | % | ±% |
|---|---|---|---|---|
| Conservative | Shaun Turner | 808 | 69.2 | |
| Conservative | Elizabeth Webster | 761 | 65.2 | |
| Labour | Rachel Beavers | 268 | 22.9 | |
| Registered electors | | 3,342 | | |
| Turnout | | 1,168 | 34.9 | |
| Conservative hold | | | | |
| Conservative hold | | | | |

=== Calder ===
Calder
| Party | Candidate | Votes | % | ±% |
|---|---|---|---|---|
| Conservative | John Ibison | 388 | 64.1 | |
| Labour | Philip Stuchfield | 217 | 35.9 | |
| Majority | | | | |
| Registered electors | | 1,918 | | |
| Turnout | | 672 | 35.0 | |
| Conservative hold | | Swing | | |

=== Carleton ===
Carleton
| Party | Candidate | Votes | % | ±% |
|---|---|---|---|---|
| Conservative | Tom Ingham | 758 | 56.3 | |
| Conservative | Michael Vincent | 602 | 44.7 | |
| Labour | Andrew Walker | 487 | 36.2 | |
| Green | Barbara Mead-Mason | 465 | 34.5 | |
| Registered electors | | 3,689 | | |
| Turnout | | 1,347 | 36.5 | |
| Conservative hold | | | | |
| Conservative hold | | | | |

=== Cleveleys Park ===
Cleveleys Park
| Party | Candidate | Votes | % | ±% |
|---|---|---|---|---|
| Conservative | Rita Amos | 789 | 58.8 | |
| Conservative | Ian Amos | 771 | 57.5 | |
| Labour | Penny Martin | 469 | 35.0 | |
| Labour | Wayne Martin | 429 | 32.0 | |
| Registered electors | | 3,844 | | |
| Turnout | | 1,341 | 34.9 | |
| Conservative hold | | | | |
| Conservative hold | | | | |

=== Garstang ===
Garstang
| Party | Candidate | Votes | % | ±% |
|---|---|---|---|---|
| Conservative | Dulcie Atkins | 1,224 | 57.9 | |
| Conservative | Alice Collinson | 1,194 | 56.5 | |
| Conservative | Robert Atkins | 1,014 | 48.0 | |
| Green | Nicholas Danby | 702 | 33.2 | |
| Labour | Margaret Anderton | 514 | 24.3 | |
| Labour | Kevin Morrison | 454 | 21.5 | |
| Registered electors | | 5,623 | | |
| Turnout | | 2,114 | 37.6 | |
| Conservative hold | | | | |
| Conservative hold | | | | |
| Conservative hold | | | | |

=== Great Eccleston ===
Great Eccleston
| Party | Candidate | Votes | % | ±% |
|---|---|---|---|---|
| Conservative | Susan Catterall | 736 | 65.2 | |
| Conservative | Peter Cartridge | 598 | 53.0 | |
| Green | Dianne Hogarth | 403 | 35.7 | |
| Labour | Niall Campbell | 214 | 19.0 | |
| Registered electors | | 3,326 | | |
| Turnout | | 1,128 | 33.9 | |
| Conservative hold | | | | |
| Conservative hold | | | | |

=== Hambleton and Stalmine ===
Hambleton and Stalmine
| Party | Candidate | Votes | % | ±% |
|---|---|---|---|---|
| Conservative | Julie Robinson | 822 | 67.1 | |
| Conservative | Lynne Bowen | 756 | 61.7 | |
| Labour | Andy Meredith | 387 | 31.6 | |
| Registered electors | | 3,661 | | |
| Turnout | | 1,225 | 33.5 | |
| Conservative hold | | | | |
| Conservative hold | | | | |

=== Hardhorn with Highcross ===
Hardhorn with Highcross
| Party | Candidate | Votes | % | ±% |
|---|---|---|---|---|
| Conservative | Simon Bridge | 1,249 | 70.0 | |
| Conservative | Barry Birch | 1,156 | 64.8 | |
| Conservative | Roger Berry | 1,124 | 63.0 | |
| Labour | Tom Calver | 455 | 25.5 | |
| Labour | David George | 410 | 23.0 | |
| Registered electors | | 5,327 | | |
| Turnout | | 1,785 | 33.5 | |
| Conservative hold | | | | |
| Conservative hold | | | | |
| Conservative hold | | | | |

=== Jubilee ===
Jubilee
| Party | Candidate | Votes | % | ±% |
|---|---|---|---|---|
| Conservative | David Walmsley | 664 | 49.8 | |
| Labour | Rob Fail | 647 | 48.5 | |
| Conservative | Barry Simmonds | 583 | 43.7 | |
| Labour | Steve Parr-Burman | 553 | 41.5 | |
| Registered electors | | 3,941 | | |
| Turnout | | 1,333 | 33.8 | |
| Conservative hold | | | | |
| Labour hold | | | | |

=== Marsh Mill ===
Marsh Mill
| Party | Candidate | Votes | % | ±% |
|---|---|---|---|---|
| Conservative | Paul Ellison | 957 | 56.3 | |
| Conservative | Lynn Walmsley | 934 | 54.9 | |
| Conservative | Ann Turner | 845 | 49.7 | |
| Labour | Carole Stephenson | 512 | 30.1 | |
| Labour | Peter Smith | 497 | 29.2 | |
| Labour | Brian Stephenson | 487 | 28.6 | |
| Liberal Democrats | Teresa Wilson | 233 | 13.7 | |
| Registered electors | | 5,058 | | |
| Turnout | | 1,700 | 33.6 | |
| Conservative hold | | | | |
| Conservative hold | | | | |
| Conservative hold | | | | |

=== Mount ===
Mount
| Party | Candidate | Votes | % | ±% |
|---|---|---|---|---|
| Labour | Paul Longton | 478 | 47.5 | |
| Conservative | Lewie Deery | 466 | 46.3 | |
| Labour | Mary Stirzaker | 428 | 42.5 | |
| Conservative | David Shaw | 368 | 36.6 | |
| Registered electors | | 4,306 | | |
| Turnout | | 1,006 | 23.4 | |
| Labour hold | | | | |
| Conservative gain from Labour | | | | |

=== Park ===
Park
| Party | Candidate | Votes | % | ±% |
|---|---|---|---|---|
| UKIP | David O'Neill | 379 | 37.6 | |
| Labour | Christine Smith | 365 | 36.2 | |
| Labour | Ron Shewan | 359 | 35.8 | |
| Conservative | Sadie Smith | 211 | 21.1 | |
| Conservative | Susan Hunt | 179 | 17.9 | |
| Green | John Warnock | 173 | 17.3 | |
| Registered electors | | 3,543 | | |
| Turnout | | 1,009 | 28.5 | |
| UKIP gain from Labour | | | | |
| Labour hold | | | | |

=== Pharos ===
Pharos
| Party | Candidate | Votes | % | ±% |
|---|---|---|---|---|
| Labour | Rachel George | 434 | 44.4 | |
| UKIP | Colette Fairbanks | 346 | 35.4 | |
| Labour | Evelyn Stephenson | 223 | 22.8 | |
| Conservative | David Platt | 199 | 20.3 | |
| Green | Michael Pickton | 168 | 17.2 | |
| Conservative | Alexander Tomlinson | 138 | 14.1 | |
| Registered electors | | 3,627 | | |
| Turnout | | 978 | 27.0 | |
| Labour hold | | | | |
| UKIP gain from Labour | | | | |

=== Pheasant's Wood ===
Pheasant's Wood
| Party | Candidate | Votes | % | ±% |
|---|---|---|---|---|
| Conservative | Andrea Kay | 489 | 74.8 | |
| Labour | Sara Wilson | 165 | 25.2 | |
| Majority | | | | |
| Registered electors | | 1,730 | | |
| Turnout | | 677 | 39.1 | |
| Conservative hold | | Swing | | |

=== Pilling ===
Pilling
| Party | Candidate | Votes | % | ±% |
|---|---|---|---|---|
| Conservative | Graham Holden | 407 | 61.8 | |
| Green | Sue White | 152 | 23.1 | |
| Labour | Peter Grant | 100 | 15.2 | |
| Majority | | | | |
| Registered electors | | 2,085 | | |
| Turnout | | 671 | 32.2 | |
| Conservative hold | | Swing | | |

=== Preesall ===
Preesall
| Party | Candidate | Votes | % | ±% |
|---|---|---|---|---|
| Conservative | Andrew Cropper | 960 | 57.2 | |
| Conservative | Phil Orme | 957 | 57.1 | |
| Conservative | Paul Moon | 905 | 54.0 | |
| Labour | Nic Fogg | 571 | 34.0 | |
| Labour | Patricia Johnson | 554 | 33.0 | |
| Labour | Anthony Johnson | 551 | 32.9 | |
| Registered electors | | 4,771 | | |
| Turnout | | 1,677 | 35.1 | |
| Conservative hold | | | | |
| Conservative hold | | | | |
| Conservative hold | | | | |

=== Rossall ===
Rossall
| Party | Candidate | Votes | % | ±% |
|---|---|---|---|---|
| Labour | Lorraine Beavers | 569 | 40.8 | |
| UKIP | David Gerrard | 523 | 37.5 | |
| Labour | Cheryl Raynor | 504 | 36.2 | |
| Conservative | Chloe Clarke | 466 | 33.5 | |
| Labour | Norah Stuchfield | 464 | 33.3 | |
| Conservative | Anne Martin | 432 | 31.0 | |
| Conservative | Frances Thewlis | 317 | 22.8 | |
| Registered electors | | 4,476 | | |
| Turnout | | 1,393 | 31.1 | |
| Labour hold | | | | |
| UKIP gain from Labour | | | | |
| Labour hold | | | | |

=== Stanah ===
Stanah
| Party | Candidate | Votes | % | ±% |
|---|---|---|---|---|
| Conservative | Kenneth Minto | 770 | 60.3 | |
| Conservative | Matthew Vincent | 665 | 52.0 | |
| Labour | Michelle Heaton-Bentley | 345 | 27.0 | |
| Labour | Eddie Rawlings | 283 | 22.1 | |
| Liberal Democrats | John Coburn | 260 | 20.3 | |
| Registered electors | | 3,856 | | |
| Turnout | | 1,278 | 33.1 | |
| Conservative hold | | | | |
| Conservative hold | | | | |

=== Tithebarn ===
Tithebarn
| Party | Candidate | Votes | % | ±% |
|---|---|---|---|---|
| Conservative | Colette Birch | 743 | 64.9 | |
| Conservative | Lesley McKay | 721 | 63.0 | |
| Labour | Tristan Stephenson | 359 | 31.4 | |
| Registered electors | | 3,408 | | |
| Turnout | | 1,144 | 33.6 | |
| Conservative hold | | | | |
| Conservative hold | | | | |

=== Victoria and Norcross ===
Victoria and Norcross
| Party | Candidate | Votes | % | ±% |
|---|---|---|---|---|
| Conservative | Callum Baxter | 792 | 63.9 | |
| Conservative | Alan Vincent | 768 | 61.9 | |
| Labour | Lesley Stewart | 357 | 28.8 | |
| Labour | Jason Taylor | 330 | 26.6 | |
| Registered electors | | 3,595 | | |
| Turnout | | 1,240 | 34.5 | |
| Conservative hold | | | | |
| Conservative hold | | | | |

=== Warren ===
Warren
| Party | Candidate | Votes | % | ±% |
|---|---|---|---|---|
| UKIP | Huw Williams | 370 | 33.9 | |
| Labour | Craig Armstrong | 360 | 33.0 | |
| Labour | Rosemary Cunningham | 352 | 32.3 | |
| Independent | Brian Crawford | 314 | 28.8 | |
| Conservative | Bernice Meekins | 236 | 21.6 | |
| Conservative | David Meekins | 212 | 19.4 | |
| Registered electors | | 3,481 | | |
| Turnout | | 1,091 | 31.3 | |
| UKIP gain from Labour | | | | |
| Labour hold | | | | |

=== Wyresdale ===
Wyresdale
| Party | Candidate | Votes | % | ±% |
|---|---|---|---|---|
| Conservative | Jonny Leech | 482 | 73.7 | |
| Labour | Stella Charnley | 172 | 26.3 | |
| Majority | | | | |
| Registered electors | | 1,819 | | |
| Turnout | | 681 | 37.4 | |
| Conservative hold | | Swing | | |

== Changes 2019–2023 ==
- 30 November 2022: David Henderson stood down as leader of Wyre Borough Council and was succeeded by Michael Vincent.

=== By-elections ===
==== Cleveleys Park ====
Cleveleys Park by-election, 30 June 2022
| Party | Candidate | Votes | % | ±% |
|---|---|---|---|---|
| Conservative | Richard Rendell | 721 | 53.7 | |
| Labour | Wayne Martin | 621 | 46.3 | |
| Majority | | 100 | 7.5 | {{{change}}} |
| Turnout | | 1,342 | 37.1 | {{{change}}} |
| Conservative hold | | | | |

The by-election filled a vacancy in the Cleveleys Park ward.

==== Preesall ====
Preesall by-election, 18 August 2022
| Party | Candidate | Votes | % | ±% |
|---|---|---|---|---|
| Independent | Collette Rushforth | 595 | 39.7 | |
| The Conservative Party Candidate | Steven Taylor-Royston | 495 | 33.0 | |
| Labour | William Jackson | 315 | 20.9 | |
| Independent | Garry Wright | 102 | 6.8 | |
| Majority | | 100 | 6.7 | {{{change}}} |
| Turnout | | 1510 | 34.0 | {{{change}}} |
| Independent gain from Conservative | | | | |

The by-election was triggered by the resignation of Conservative councillor Andrew Cropper.
