= Marsh Mill =

Windmill in Thornton, Lancashire, England

- The windmill in 2009
- Interactive map of Marsh Mill

Origin
- Mill location: Thornton, Lancashire, England
- Grid reference: SD 335 426
- Coordinates: 53.8749°N 3.0120°W
- Year built: 1794

Information
- Purpose: Corn mill
- Type: Tower mill
- Storeys: Five
- No. of sails: Four
- Type of sails: Patent sails
- Windshaft: Cast iron
- Winding: Fantail
- Fantail blades: Eight
- No. of pairs of millstones: Four
Listed Building – Grade II*
Official name	Marsh Mill
Designated	24 March 1950
Reference no.	1073150

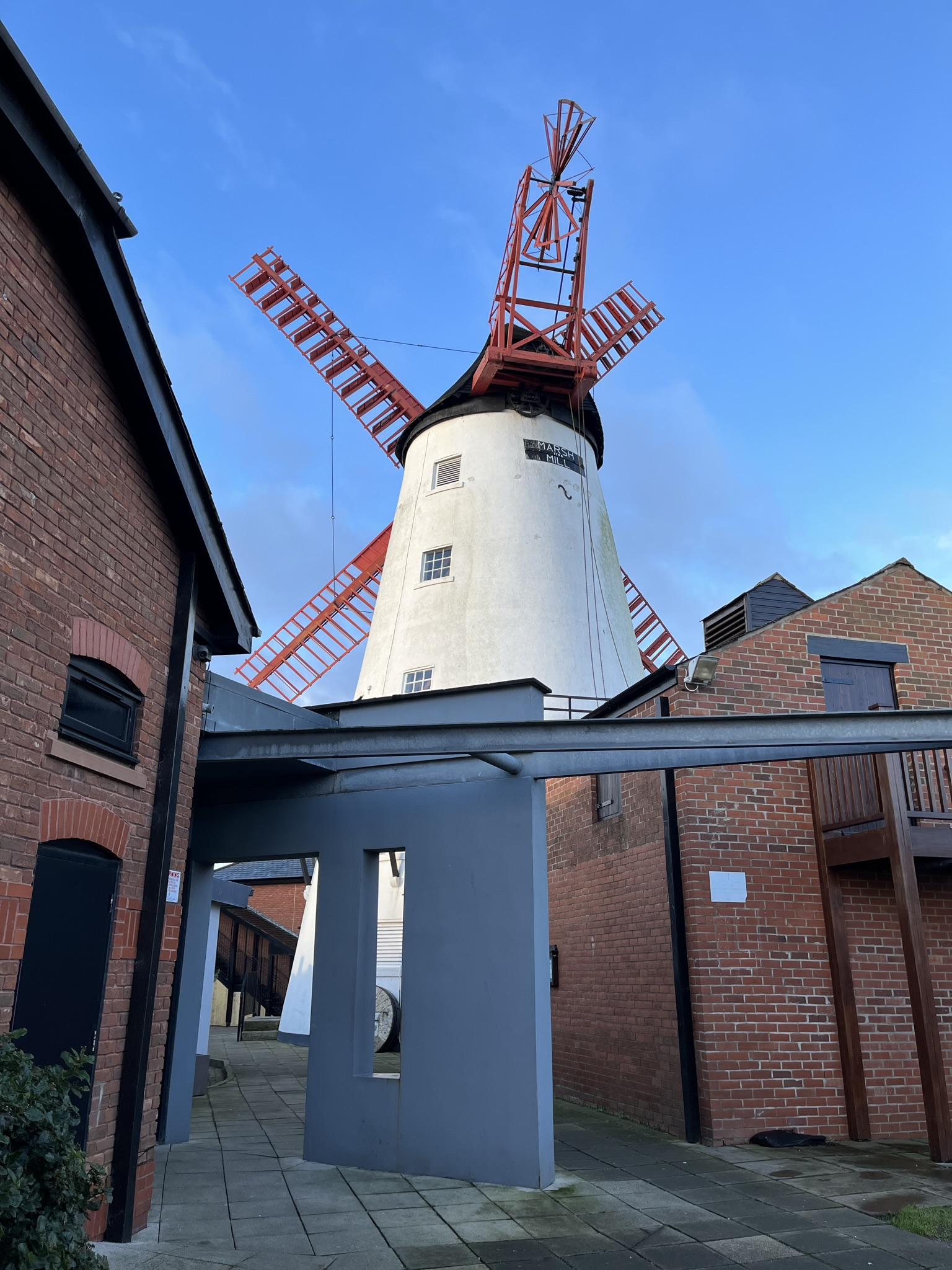
Marsh Mill in 2023

Marsh Mill is an 18th-century tower windmill in Thornton, Lancashire, England. It was built in 1794 by Ralph Slater for local landowner Bold Hesketh. It functioned as a corn mill until the 1920s and has been fully restored. It is a good example of a complete English windmill and has been designated a Grade II* listed building.

== History ==
Marsh Mill was commissioned by local landowner Bold Fleetwood Hesketh of Rossall Hall and built in 1794 by Fylde millwright Ralph Slater. It was named after the marshy area in the north Fylde that was drained by Hesketh for the mill's construction. Slater was a well-known millwright in the area; he also built mills at Pilling and Clifton. The mill was initially used to grind different grades of flour. From the early 19th century, it was used to grind meal for farm animal feed. In the 19th century, the original chain and wheel winding gear was replaced with a four-bladed fantail. The original common sails were replaced with patent sails in 1896. The mill stopped working in the 1920s. From 1928 to 1935, Marsh Mill functioned as a café. In 1930 two women who intended to buy the mill fell and died while inspecting it, when the fantail staging collapsed when they stood on it.

It was designated a Grade II* listed building on 24 March 1950. The Grade II* designation—the second highest of the three grades—is for "particularly important buildings of more than special interest". Beginning in 1965, a 20-year restoration took place by the Marsh Mill Preservation Society. Further restoration was completed in 1990, bringing the machinery to full working order. It has been described as the "best preserved" and "finest" windmill in North West England. English Heritage have called it "an exceptionally complete example of a tower windmill in a national context".

In 1999 Wyre Council leased the mill for a 25-year period, having sold it to property developers Melrose Development Services for £1.4 million.

== Structure ==
Marsh Mill is built of rendered brick; it is more than 70 feet (21 m) tall and has five storeys. The tower tapers and it has plain square windows. There is a two-storey kiln house attached. The ground floor and first floor are storage areas and have drying rooms. The second floor is the meal floor; it contains corn-dressing machinery. At the second floor, there is an external wooden stage that encircles the tower and is supported by stone corbels at the first floor level. This staging gives access to the sails.

The third floor is the stone floor, which contains four sets of millstones. The top floor is the dust floor. Like many Fylde windmills, the tower is topped with a boat-shaped wooden cap. It now has a "Lees Flyer" fantail.

== See also ==
- Grade II* listed buildings in Lancashire
- Listed buildings in Thornton-Cleveleys
- List of windmills in Lancashire
