= Pilling Sands =

Wetland in Lancashire, England

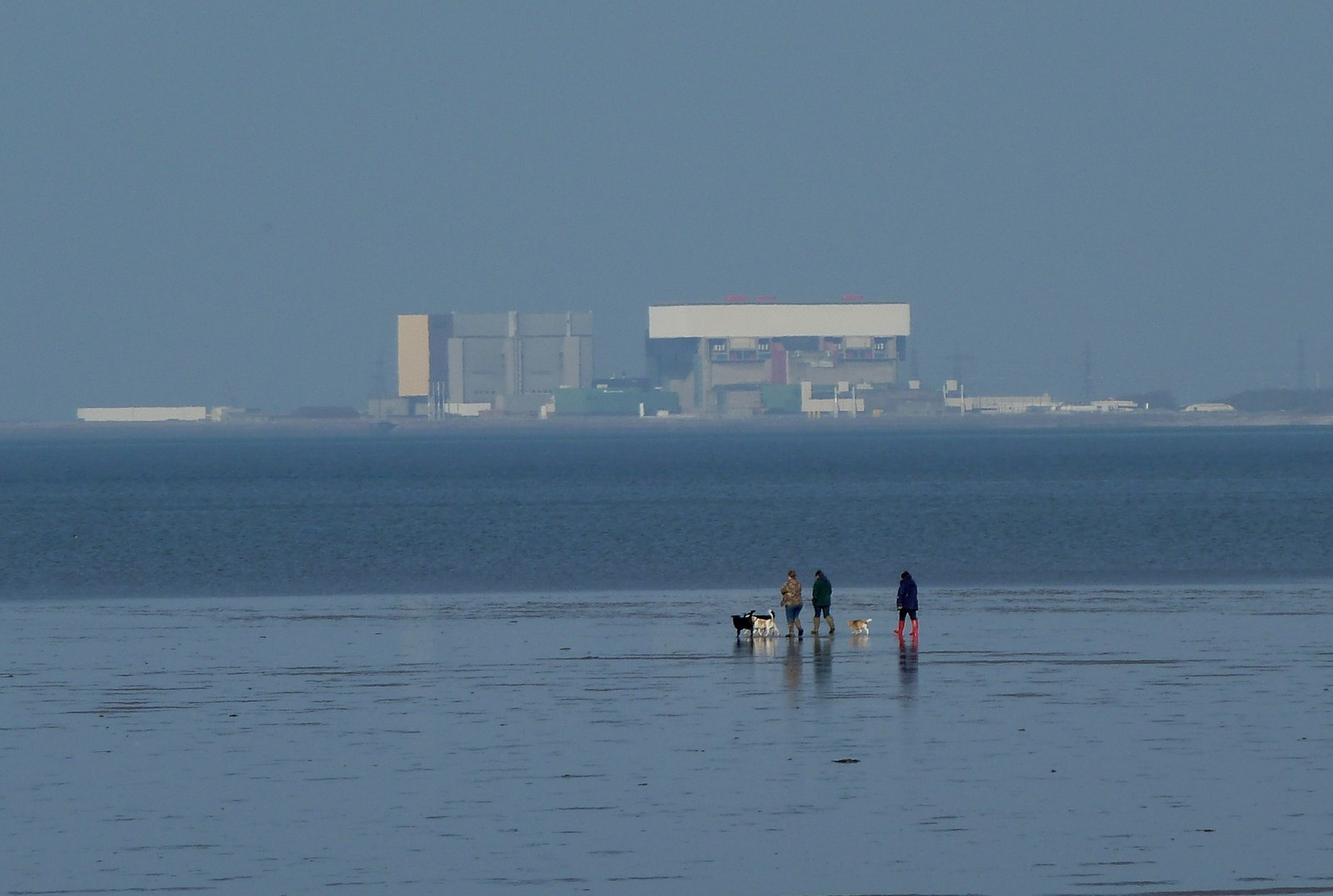
- People walking on the sands, with Heysham Power Station, located to the north, in the background

- Location within Lancashire Location within Morecambe Bay Location within the Borough of Wyre Location within England

Geography
- Country: England
- District: Wyre, Lancashire
- Population center: Pilling
- Coordinates: 53.95°N 2.92°W
- Interactive map of Pilling Sands

Pilling Sands is a tidal marsh in the Borough of Wyre, Lancashire, England. Named after the village of Pilling, located on the Fylde coast immediately to the south, it forms part of the southern edge of Morecambe Bay. Cockerham Sands adjoins it to the east.

The 134-mile (216 km)-long Lancashire Coastal Way runs beside the sands. This section is closed from 26 December to Good Friday to protect lambs and birdlife. Rare birds for Lancashire that have been spotted near the sands include lesser yellowlegs and hoopoe.

In 2022, the North West Inshore Fisheries and Conservation Authority found that the Pilling Sands cockle fishery was, in a Habitats Regulations Assessment, in non-compliance of the North West Sea Fisheries Commission byelaw 13A, and was subsequently closed temporarily. Closure notices are active until two consecutive samples return normal levels of bacteriological quality for the production area.

Horse racing regularly took place on the sands in the 19th century.
