= Damside Windmill =

Tower windmill in Lancashire

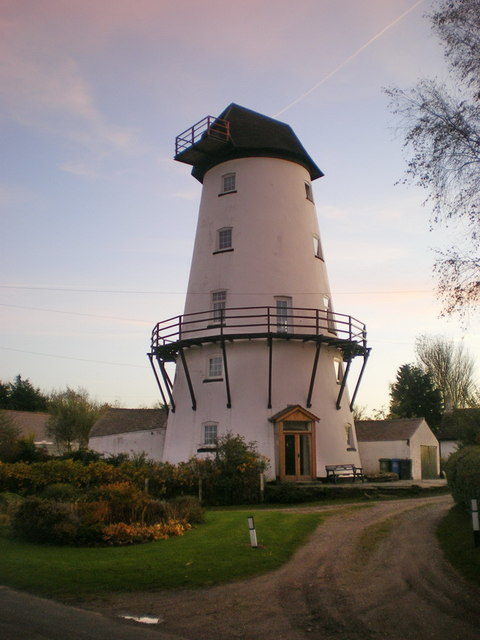
- Looking southwest, 2009
- Interactive map of Damside Windmill

Origin
- Mill location: Pilling, Lancashire, England
- Coordinates: 53.9310771°N 2.9038817°W
- Year built: 1808; 218 years ago

Information
- Type: Tower mill
- Storeys: Five
- Windshaft: Cast iron

Damside Windmill (locally also known as Pilling Windmill and The Old Mill) is a tower windmill style structure in the English village of Pilling, Lancashire. It was built in 1808 by Ralph Slater, a builder of similar structures in the area, such as Marsh Mill. An earlier mill was marked here on Yates's 1786 map of Lancashire.

The mill was converted to steam power in 1870, and the sails were removed in 1887. It continued to operate into the 1920s, after which it fell into disrepair. By 1975, the mill had been restored for use as a private residence. The top of the windmill was restored with a traditional wooden cap in 2007, which restored it to its original height of 73 feet (22 m).

Inventor Richard Gornall worked out of a barn attached to the mill in the late 19th century.

== See also ==
- List of windmills in Lancashire

== Bibliography ==
- Clarke, Allen (1916). Windmill Land. London: J M Dent & Sons. ISBN 9780946571086.
