= Eagland Hill =

Hamlet in Lancashire, England

Coordinates: 53.900°N 2.868°W

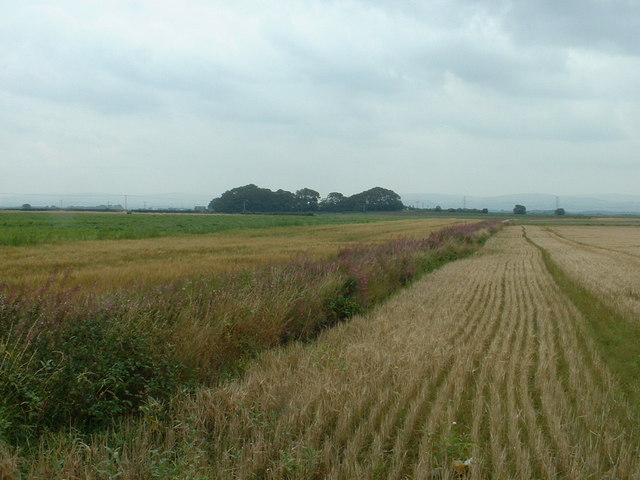
- Farmland near Birk's Farm

- Shown within Wyre Borough Shown on the Fylde Location within Lancashire
- Population: 272 (2001)
- OS grid reference: SD429452
- Civil parish: Pilling
- District: Wyre
- Shire county: Lancashire
- Region: North West
- Country: England
- Sovereign state: United Kingdom
- Post town: PRESTON
- Postcode district: PR3
- Dialling code: 01253
- Police: Lancashire
- Fire: Lancashire
- Ambulance: North West
- UK Parliament: Lancaster and Fleetwood

Eagland Hill is a rural hamlet in Pilling, Lancashire, England. It lies in a part of the Fylde, west of Garstang, known locally as Over Wyre. The church, dedicated to St Mark, dates from 1870. The area attracts many bird-watchers due to the number of rare birds.

== St Mark's Church ==
The church's foundation stone was laid on 13 August 1869 by co-founder James Jenkinson, and the church was opened on St Mark's Day, 20 April, the following year. Jenkinson's cottage was the first house to be built in the village, in 1814, and the church altar is located where the cottage fireplace once stood. The church does not have a graveyard.

Next to the church is the church hall which still has, in use, a Victorian letter-box.

== Brook Farm Airfield ==
Just under 1 mile (1.6 km) west of the hamlet is Brook Farm Airfield. Its two grass runways are 07/25, 420 metres (1,380 ft), and 09/27, 435 metres (1,427 ft). It is located 3 miles (4.8 km) southwest of Tarn Farm Airfield (Rossall Airfield) (GB-0440) in Cockerham and 5 miles (8.0 km) northwest of St Michael's Airfield (GB-0398).

== Gallery ==
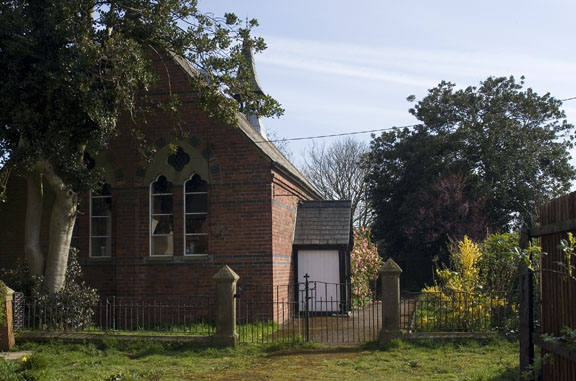
St Mark's Church

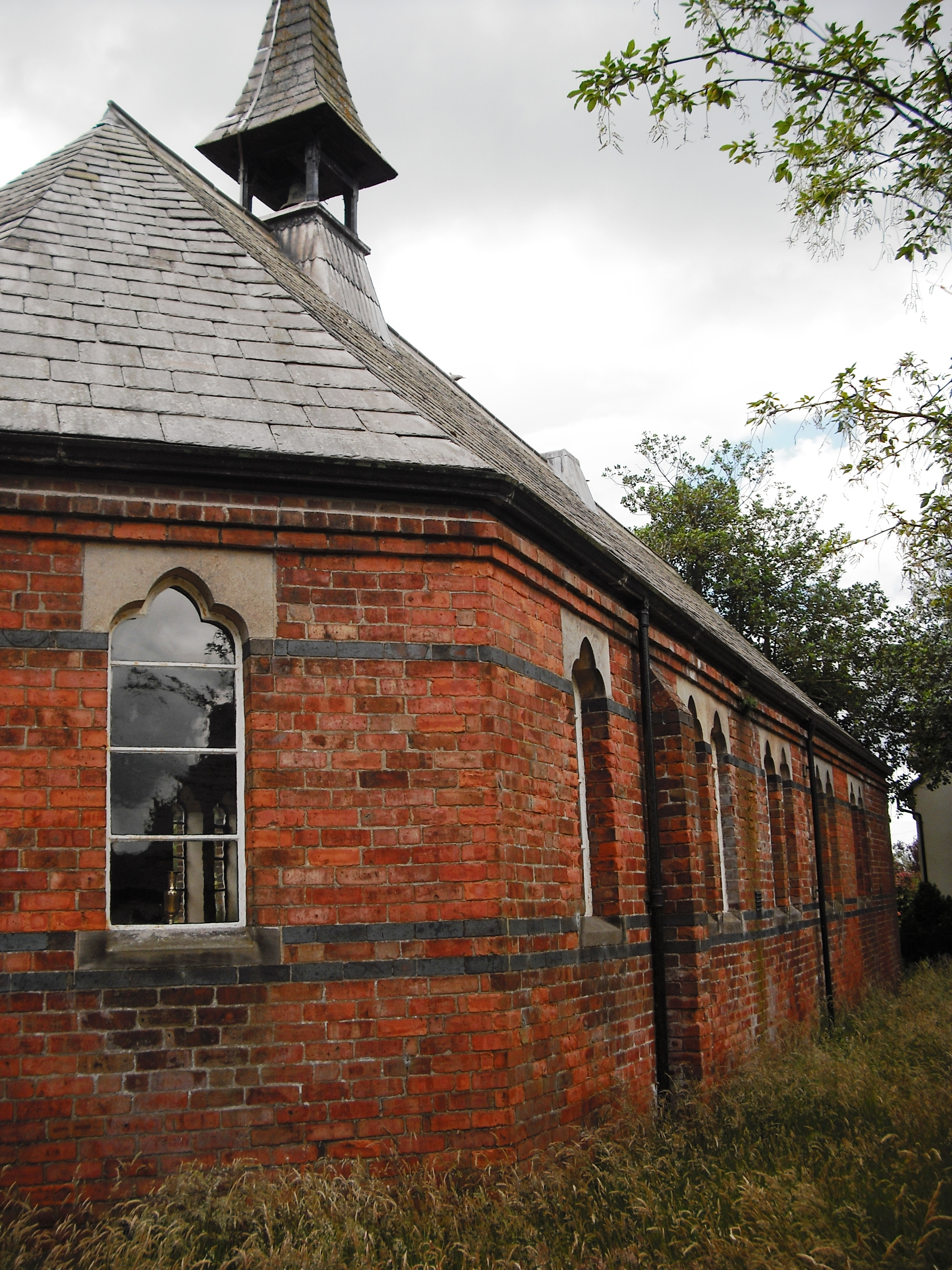
St Mark's Church, east end

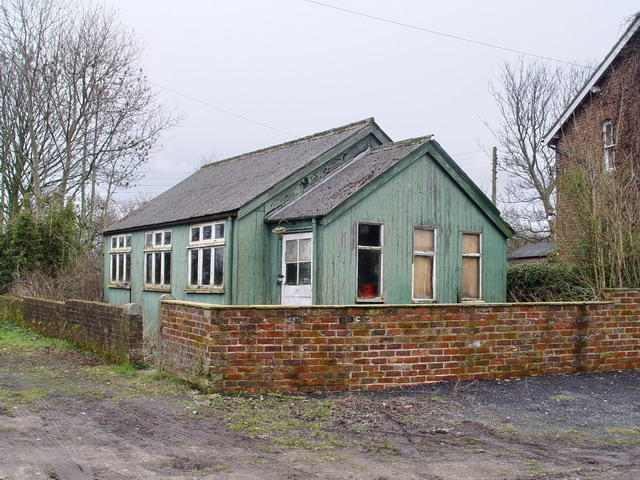
Hut at Eagland Hill

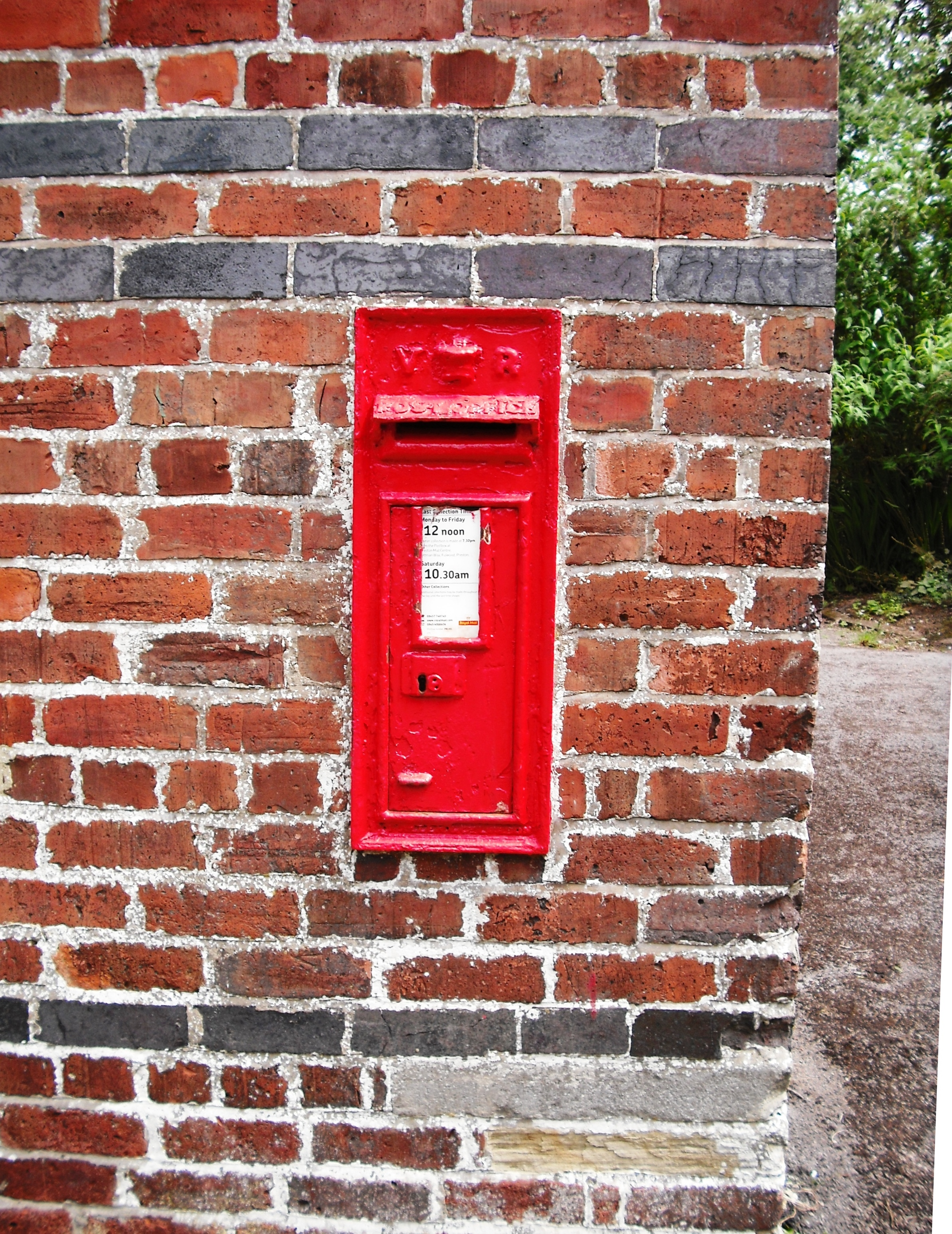
Victorian letter-box
