= 1973 Wyre Borough Council election =

Election

- 10 May 1973

All 55 seats to Wyre Borough Council 28 seats needed for a majority

	First party	Second party	Third party
Party	Conservative	Labour	Independent
Seats won	46	2	7
Popular vote	27,982	9,467	7,450
Leader after election
Conservative

The 1973 Wyre Borough Council election took place on 10 May 1973. It was the first election to the newly formed Wyre Borough Council following the local government reorganisation of 1972. This was on the same day as other local elections in England.

== Summary ==
The election resulted in a Conservative majority on the new council.

=== Election result ===
1973 Wyre Borough Council
Party	Candidates	Seats	Gains	Losses	Net gain/loss	Seats %	Votes %	Votes	+/−
Conservative	54	46						27,982	
Labour	18	2						9,467	
Independent	13	7						7,450	

== Ward Results ==
=== Bailey ===
Bailey (3 seats)
Party	Candidate	Votes	%	±%
Conservative	Storey K.	Unopposed		
Conservative	Turner P.	Unopposed		
Conservative	Chippendale H.	Unopposed		
Turnout		0		
Conservative win (new seat)				
Conservative win (new seat)				
Conservative win (new seat)				

=== Brock ===
Brock (1 seat)
Party	Candidate	Votes	%	±%
Conservative	Shorrock J.	Unopposed		
Turnout		0		
Conservative win (new seat)				

=== Calder ===
Calder (1 seat)
Party	Candidate	Votes	%	±%
Conservative	Ibison T.	Unopposed		
Turnout		0		
Conservative win (new seat)				

=== Catterall ===
Catterall (1 seat)
Party	Candidate	Votes	%	±%
Conservative	Greenwood R.	425	52.1	
Independent	Shorrock R.	390	47.9	
Turnout				
Conservative win (new seat)				

=== Garstang ===
Garstang (2 seats)
Party	Candidate	Votes	%	±%
Independent	Greenhow J.	720		
Independent	Moreland F.	712		
Conservative	Mears P.	510		
Conservative	Eaves J. Ms.	428		
Turnout				
Independent win (new seat)				
Independent win (new seat)				

=== Great Eccleston ===
Great Eccleston (1 seat)
Party	Candidate	Votes	%	±%
Conservative	Wild S.	470	49.6	
Independent	Anderton W.	262	27.6	
Independent	Halsall T.	216	22.8	
Turnout				
Conservative win (new seat)				

=== Hardhorn ===
Hardhorn (2 seats)
Party	Candidate	Votes	%	±%
Conservative	Bennett K.	Unopposed		
Conservative	Stebbing C.	Unopposed		
Turnout		0		
Conservative win (new seat)				
Conservative win (new seat)				

=== High Cross ===
High Cross (2 seats)
Party	Candidate	Votes	%	±%
Conservative	Gorst J.	792		
Conservative	Anderson L. Ms.	789		
Labour	Hogston A.	432		
Turnout				
Conservative win (new seat)				
Conservative win (new seat)				

=== Thornton Cleveleys North ===
Thornton Cleveleys: North (3 seats)
Party	Candidate	Votes	%	±%
Conservative	Croft T.	911		
Conservative	Brown H.	816		
Labour	Godfrey R.	756		
Labour	Jackson D.	755		
Labour	Wright G. Ms	712		
Conservative	Goodier D. Ms.	707		
Turnout				
Conservative win (new seat)				
Conservative win (new seat)				
Labour win (new seat)				

=== Thornton Cleveleys North Central ===
Thornton Cleveleys: North Central (3 seats)
Party	Candidate	Votes	%	±%
Conservative	Croasdale C.	1,113		
Conservative	Crofts W.	1,033		
Conservative	Blackburn V.	1,023		
Labour	Fail E.	903		
Labour	Davies A.	844		
Labour	Horsley J.	815		
Turnout				
Conservative win (new seat)				
Conservative win (new seat)				
Conservative win (new seat)				

=== Thornton Cleveleys East ===
Thornton Cleveleys: East (3 seats)
Party	Candidate	Votes	%	±%
Conservative	Holt D.	1,086		
Conservative	Ashworth C.	1,077		
Conservative	Bradford B.	1,037		
Labour	Moyle G.	319		
Turnout				
Conservative win (new seat)				
Conservative win (new seat)				
Conservative win (new seat)				

=== Thornton Cleveleys South ===
Thornton Cleveleys: South (2 seats)
Party	Candidate	Votes	%	±%
Conservative	Goodier H.	551		
Conservative	Ball W.	539		
Labour	Lindley P. Ms.	136		
Turnout				
Conservative win (new seat)				
Conservative win (new seat)				

=== Thornton Cleveleys West ===
Thornton Cleveleys: West (2 seats)
Party	Candidate	Votes	%	±%
Conservative	Townend F.	787		
Independent	Hibbert F.	666		
Conservative	Dickens T.	570		
Turnout				
Conservative win (new seat)				
Independent win (new seat)				

=== Fleetwood Mount ===
Fleetwood: Mount (2 seats)
Party	Candidate	Votes	%	±%
Conservative	Robinson B.	Unopposed		
Conservative	Snape R.	Unopposed		
Turnout		0		
Conservative win (new seat)				
Conservative win (new seat)				

=== Cabus ===
Cabus (1 seat)
Party	Candidate	Votes	%	±%
Conservative	Jackson J.	Unopposed		
Turnout		0		
Conservative win (new seat)				

=== Hambleton ===
Hambleton (1 seat)
Party	Candidate	Votes	%	±%
Conservative	Williamson R.	Unopposed		
Turnout		0		
Conservative win (new seat)				

=== Pilling ===
Pilling (1 seat)
Party	Candidate	Votes	%	±%
Conservative	Hodgson E.	616	83.4	
Independent	Thomas E. Ms.	123	16.6	
Turnout		0		
Conservative win (new seat)				

=== Stalmine-With-Staynall ===
Stalmine-With-Staynall (1 seat)
Party	Candidate	Votes	%	±%
Conservative	Makinson J.	536	87.7	
Independent	Thompson T.	75	12.3	
Turnout		0		
Conservative win (new seat)				

=== Fleetwood Park ===
Fleetwood: Park (3 seats)
Party	Candidate	Votes	%	±%
Conservative	O'Connor F.	488		
Conservative	Funk E.	447		
Labour	Wright R.	432		
Labour	Consadine L.	423		
Labour	Potts W.	392		
Turnout				
Conservative win (new seat)				
Conservative win (new seat)				
Labour win (new seat)				

=== Fleetwood Rossall ===
Fleetwood: Rossall (3 seats)
Party	Candidate	Votes	%	±%
Conservative	Anderton F.	573		
Conservative	Keating T.	572		
Conservative	Timms D.	567		
Labour	Wright W.	178		
Turnout				
Conservative win (new seat)				
Conservative win (new seat)				
Conservative win (new seat)				

=== Poulton-le-Fylde Breck ===
Poulton-le-Fylde: Breck (2 seats)
Party	Candidate	Votes	%	±%
Conservative	Mellalieu E.	830		
Conservative	McGregor B.	804		
Labour	Stephenson E. Ms.	395		
Labour	Dobson S.	392		
Turnout				
Conservative win (new seat)				
Conservative win (new seat)				

=== Carleton ===
Carleton (1 seat)
Party	Candidate	Votes	%	±%
Conservative	Davis J.	Unopposed		
Turnout		0		
Conservative win (new seat)				

=== Pharos ===
Pharos (2 seats)
Party	Candidate	Votes	%	±%
Conservative	Atkinson E. Ms.	705		
Conservative	Cheetham V.	594		
Labour	Shaw J.	583		
Labour	Long J.	482		
Turnout		0		
Conservative win (new seat)				
Conservative win (new seat)				

=== Preesall ===
Preesall (3 seats)
Party	Candidate	Votes	%	±%
Independent	Trippier H.	1,374		
Conservative	McMurray A.	894		
Independent	Millward F.	729		
Independent	Woods H.	650		
Conservative	Hunt R.	537		
Conservative	Scott H.	480		
Turnout				
Independent win (new seat)				
Conservative win (new seat)				
Independent win (new seat)				

=== Tithebarn ===
Tithebarn (2 seats)
Party	Candidate	Votes	%	±%
Conservative	Bennett A.	Unopposed		
Conservative	Ashworth H.	Unopposed		
Turnout		0		
Conservative win (new seat)				
Conservative win (new seat)				

=== Victoria ===
Victoria (3 seats)
Party	Candidate	Votes	%	±%
Independent	Cass I. Ms.	1,150		
Conservative	Grime J.	923		
Conservative	Powell G.	812		
Conservative	Simmons J.	681		
Turnout				
Independent win (new seat)				
Conservative win (new seat)				

=== Warren ===
Warren (3 seats)
Party	Candidate	Votes	%	±%
Conservative	Formstone H.	673		
Conservative	Hope E. Ms.	669		
Conservative	Bradbury B. Ms.	604		
Labour	Denney W.	518		
Turnout				
Conservative win (new seat)				
Conservative win (new seat)				
Conservative win (new seat)				

=== Wyresdale ===
Wyresdale (1 seat)
Party	Candidate	Votes	%	±%
Independent	Curwen E.	383	55.0	
Conservative	Livesey W.	313	45.0	
Turnout				
Independent win (new seat)				
