= 2023 Wyre Borough Council election =

Local Election in England

- 4 May 2023

All 50 seats on Wyre Borough Council 26 seats needed for a majority

	First party	Second party	Third party
Leader	Michael Vincent	Rob Fail
Party	Conservative	Labour	Independent
Leader's seat	Carleton	Jubilee
Seats before	37	8	5 (Note: Of the 4 independent councillors before the election, 2 formed the "Wyre Residents' Group", 1 formed the "Wyre Alliance" and 1 was described as "Independent". There was also a vacant independent seat previously held by Collette Fairbanks who had been elected for UKIP in 2019 but later sat as an independent in the Wyre Alliance group.)
Seats after	30	17	3
Seat change	▼7	▲9	▼1
- Results by ward, including delayed Warren election
Leader before election
Michael Vincent
Conservative
Leader after election
Michael Vincent
Conservative

The 2023 Wyre Borough Council election took place on 4 May 2023, alongside other local elections across England. All 50 seats on the Wyre Borough Council were up for election. The election in Warren ward took place on 22 June 2023, due to the death of a candidate.

== Background ==
Council Composition Pre-Election

=== Pre-Election Council Composition ===
Party	Seats
Conservative Party	37
Labour Party	8
Independents	4
Vacant	1

=== Post-Election Council Composition ===
Party	Seats
Conservative Party	30
Labour Party	17
Independents	3
Vacant	0

Composition of the Council after the election

== Candidates and Results ==
The following is a list of candidates and results sorted alphabetically by ward:

=== Bourne ===
Bourne
Party	Candidate	Votes	%	±%
Labour	Victoria Wells	604	53.5	+8.5
Labour	Harry Swatton	582	51.5	+7.6
Labour	Kevin Higginson	581	51.4	+10.9
Conservative	Howard Ballard	500	44.2	−1.6
Conservative	Jack Eccles	461	40.8	−5.0
Conservative	Thomas Wyers-Roebuck	453	40.1	−1.9
Turnout		1,130	25.08	
Labour gain from Conservative		Swing		
Labour gain from Conservative		Swing		
Labour hold		Swing		

=== Breck ===
Breck
Party	Candidate	Votes	%	±%
Conservative	Peter le Marinel	471	43.0	−3.0
Conservative	Jane Preston	463	41.1	−0.3
Labour	Thomas Calver	418	38.1	N/A
Labour	Sean Hazlewood	404	36.9	+16.2
Independent	Peter Gibson	259	23.6	−13.2
Majority				
Turnout		1,096	32.67	
Conservative hold		Swing		
Conservative hold		Swing		

=== Brock with Catterall ===
Brock with Catterall
Party	Candidate	Votes	%	±%
Conservative	Daniel Bolton	696	57.6	−11.6
Conservative	David Swift	595	49.3	−15.9
Labour	Olivia Bonser	544	45.0	+22.1
Majority				
Turnout		1,208	32.82	
Conservative hold		Swing		
Conservative hold		Swing		

=== Calder ===
Calder
Party	Candidate	Votes	%	±%
Conservative	John Ibison	386	54.7	−9.4
Labour	Michelle Heaton-Bentley	320	45.3	+9.4
Majority				
Turnout		706	36.00	
Conservative hold		Swing		

=== Carleton ===
Carleton
Party	Candidate	Votes	%	±%
Labour	Andrew Walker	725	51.8	+15.6
Labour	Stuart Fielding	696	49.7	N/A
Conservative	Christina Townsend	608	43.4	−12.9
Conservative	Andrew Lyons-Walker	538	38.4	−6.3
ADF	Adele Eaves	99	7.1	N/A
Majority				
Turnout		1,400	39.85	
Labour gain from Conservative		Swing		
Labour gain from Conservative		Swing		

=== Cleveleys Park ===
Cleveleys Park
Party	Candidate	Votes	%	±%
Conservative	Ian Amos	705	50.0	−7.5
Conservative	Richard Rendell	699	49.5	−9.3
Labour	Carol Audley	567	40.2	+5.2
Labour	Marge Anderton	500	35.4	+3.4
Liberal Democrats	Craig Hinchcliffe	109	7.7	N/A
ADF	Cate McNeal	77	5.5	N/A
Majority				
Turnout		1,411	38.66	
Conservative hold		Swing		
Conservative hold		Swing		

=== Garstang ===
Garstang
Party	Candidate	Votes	%	±%
Conservative	Dulcie Atkins	1,065	53.7	−4.2
Conservative	Elizabeth Collinson	1,050	53.0	−3.5
Conservative	Robert Atkins	923	46.5	−1.5
Labour	David Gale	787	39.7	+15.4
Labour	John Moore	732	36.9	+15.4
Green	Luke Meeks	702	35.4	+2.2
Majority				
Turnout		1,983	36.78	
Conservative hold		Swing		
Conservative hold		Swing		
Conservative hold		Swing		

=== Great Eccleston ===
Great Eccleston
Party	Candidate	Votes	%	±%
Conservative	Susan Catterall	758	63.6	−1.6
Conservative	Peter Cartridge	711	59.6	+6.6
Green	Dianne Hogarth	372	31.2	−4.5
Labour	Patrick Haley	361	30.3	+11.3
Majority				
Turnout		1,192	34.32	
Conservative hold		Swing		
Conservative hold		Swing		

=== Hambleton and Stalmine-with-Staynall ===
Hambleton and Stalmine-with-Staynall
Party	Candidate	Votes	%	±%
Conservative	Julie Robinson	693	57.3	−9.8
Conservative	Lynne Bowen	629	52.0	−9.7
Labour	Helen Fielding	374	30.9	−0.7
Green	Barbara Mead-Mason	265	21.9	N/A
Independent	John Bell-Fairclough	203	16.8	N/A
Majority				
Turnout		1,209	32.73	
Conservative hold		Swing		
Conservative hold		Swing		

=== Hardhorn with High Cross ===
Hardhorn with High Cross
Party	Candidate	Votes	%	±%
Conservative	Simon Bridge	1,097	58.5	−11.5
Conservative	Roger Berry	1,028	54.9	−8.1
Conservative	Steve Nicholls	886	47.3	−17.5
Labour	Melanie Calver	767	40.9	+15.4
ADF	Jackie Lang	307	16.4	N/A
Majority				
Turnout		1,874	35.86	
Conservative hold		Swing		
Conservative hold		Swing		
Conservative hold		Swing		

=== Jubilee ===
Jubilee
Party	Candidate	Votes	%	±%
Labour	Rob Fail	598	51.6	+3.1
Labour	Wayne Martin	544	46.9	+5.4
Conservative	Scott Faulkner	537	46.3	−3.5
Conservative	Scott Porter	486	41.9	−1.8
Majority				
Turnout		1,159	32.80	
Labour hold		Swing		
Labour gain from Conservative		Swing		

=== Marsh Mill ===
Marsh Mill
Party	Candidate	Votes	%	±%
Conservative	David Higgs	902	56.4	+1.5
Conservative	Paul Ellison	900	56.3	±0.0
Conservative	Henry Jackson	805	50.3	+0.6
Labour	Peter Smith	659	41.2	+12.0
Labour	William Jackson	616	38.5	+7.4
Labour	Jason Taylor	594	37.1	+8.5
Majority				
Turnout		1,600	33.65	
Conservative hold		Swing		
Conservative hold		Swing		
Conservative hold		Swing		

=== Mount ===
Mount
Party	Candidate	Votes	%	±%
Labour	Carole Stephenson	555	65.2	+17.7
Labour	Mary Stirzaker	488	57.3	+14.8
Conservative	Sadie Smith	273	32.1	−14.2
Conservative	Timothy Ashton	263	30.9	−5.7
Majority				
Turnout		851	22.45	
Labour hold		Swing		
Labour hold		Swing		

=== Park ===
Park
Party	Candidate	Votes	%	±%
Labour	Lorraine Beavers	504	64.3	+28.5
Labour	Christine Smith	451	57.5	+21.3
Conservative	Geraldine Northwood	275	35.1	+14.0
Conservative	Susan Hunt	188	24.0	+6.1
Majority				
Turnout		784	23.53	
Labour hold		Swing		
Labour gain from UKIP		Swing		

=== Pharos ===
Pharos
Party	Candidate	Votes	%	±%
Labour	Ruth Duffy	444	61.8	+17.4
Labour	Michelle Moliner	376	52.4	+29.6
Conservative	David Shaw	200	27.9	+7.6
Conservative	Matthew Vincent	173	24.1	+10.0
Green	Michael Pickton	108	15.0	−2.2
Majority				
Turnout		718	21.35	
Labour hold		Swing		
Labour gain from UKIP		Swing		

=== Pheasant's Wood ===
Pheasant's Wood
Party	Candidate	Votes	%	±%
Conservative	Andrea Kay	437	66.7	−8.1
Labour	Joy Stephenson	218	33.3	+8.1
Majority				
Turnout		655	38.10	
Conservative hold		Swing		

=== Pilling ===
Pilling
Party	Candidate	Votes	%	±%
Conservative	Adam Leigh	318	42.9	−18.9
Independent	Bob Rushforth	277	37.3	N/A
Labour	Rachel Beavers	147	19.8	+4.6
Majority		742	35.72	
Turnout				
Conservative hold		Swing		

=== Preesall ===
Preesall
Party	Candidate	Votes	%	±%
Independent	Claire Rimmer	1,010	56.5	N/A
Independent	Collette Rushforth	938	52.5	N/A
Independent	Ashley Sorensen	636	35.6	N/A
Conservative	Philip Orme	590	33.0	−24.1
Conservative	Steven Taylor-Royston	544	30.4	−26.8
Conservative	Paul Moon	537	30.1	−23.9
Labour	Ron Shewan	318	17.8	−16.2
Majority				
Turnout		1,787	39.80	
Independent gain from Conservative		Swing		
Independent gain from Conservative		Swing		
Independent gain from Conservative		Swing		

=== Rossall ===
Rossall
Party	Candidate	Votes	%	±%
Labour	Cheryl Raynor	523	44.0	+7.8
Conservative	Bernice Meekins	493	41.5	+8.0
Conservative	Frances Thewlis	481	40.5	+17.7
Labour	Evelyn Stephenson	460	38.7	−2.1
Labour	Robbie Raynor	455	38.3	+5.0
Conservative	Huw Williams	445	37.5	+6.5
Independent	David Gerrard	250	21.0	−16.5
Majority				
Turnout		1,188	27.87	
Labour hold		Swing		
Conservative gain from UKIP		Swing		
Conservative gain from Labour		Swing		

=== Stanah ===
Stanah
Party	Candidate	Votes	%	±%
Conservative	Steven Livesey	774	60.7	+8.7
Conservative	Kenneth Minto	671	52.6	−7.7
Labour	Eddie Rawlings	548	43.0	+20.9
Majority		1,275	33.59	
Turnout				
Conservative hold		Swing		
Conservative hold		Swing		

=== Tithebarn ===
Tithebarn
Party	Candidate	Votes	%	±%
Conservative	Colette Birch	601	54.4	−10.5
Conservative	Lesley McKay	577	52.3	−10.7
Labour	Richard Gratrix	503	45.6	+14.2
Majority				
Turnout		1,104	33.81	
Conservative hold		Swing		
Conservative hold		Swing		

=== Victoria and Norcross ===
Victoria and Norcross
Party	Candidate	Votes	%	±%
Conservative	Callum Baxter	693	56.6	−7.3
Conservative	Michael Vincent	634	51.8	−10.1
Labour	Lauren Harrison	504	41.2	+12.4
Labour	Dawn McCord	465	38.0	+11.4
Majority				
Turnout		1,224	33.51	
Conservative hold		Swing		
Conservative hold		Swing		

=== Warren ===
This election took place on 22 June 2023, due to the death of a candidate.

Warren
Party	Candidate	Votes	%	±%
Labour	Maureen Blair	552		
Labour	Brian Stephenson	503		
Conservative	John Fitzgerald	311		
Conservative	David Meekins	307		
Majority				
Turnout			26.48	
Labour hold		Swing		
Labour gain from UKIP		Swing		

=== Wyresdale ===
Wyresdale
Party	Candidate	Votes	%	±%
Labour	Charlotte Walker	396	59.0	+32.7
Conservative	Jonny Leech	275	41.0	−32.7
Majority				
Turnout		671	36.14	
Labour gain from Conservative		Swing		

== Changes 2023–2027 ==
- David Higgs, elected as a Conservative, joined Reform UK in June 2024.
- Paul Ellison, elected as an independent, joined Reform UK in March 2025.
- Wayne Martin, elected as a Labour councillor, left the Labour group in May 2025 and became an independent Socialist.

=== By-elections ===
==== Marsh Mill ====
Marsh Mill by-election, 7 November 2024
Party	Candidate	Votes	%	±%
Reform	James Crawford	567	38.6	N/A
Conservative	Howard Ballard	449	30.6	–27.2
Labour	James Mason	400	27.2	–15.0
Green	Caroline Montague	52	3.5	N/A
Majority		118	8.0	N/A
Turnout		1,468	30.3	–3.4
Reform gain from Conservative				

The Marsh Mill by-election was triggered by the resignation of Conservative councillor Henry Jackson.

==== Park ====
Park by-election: 1 May 2025
Party	Candidate	Votes	%	±%
Reform	Alice Jones	534	58.1	N/A
Labour	Rachel Wilkinson	229	24.9	–39.8
Conservative	JJ Fitzgerald	156	17.0	–18.3
Majority		305	33.2	N/A
Turnout		929	28.2	+4.7
Reform gain from Labour				

The Park by-election was triggered by the resignation of Labour councillor Beavers. The Park by-election was triggered by the resignation of Labour councillor Lorraine Beavers, who had been elected as the MP for Blackpool North and Fleetwood in the 2024 general election.
