= Stake Pool =

Hamlet in Lancashire, England

Coordinates: 53.928°N 2.895°W

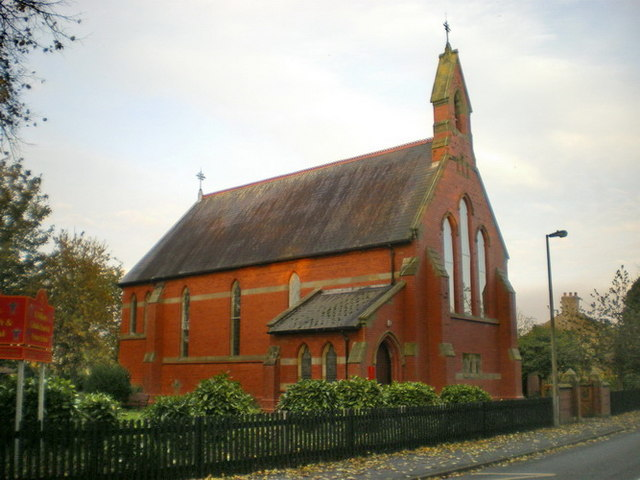
- St William of York Church, Stake Pool

- Shown within Wyre Borough Shown on the Fylde Location within Lancashire
- Population: 408 (2001)
- OS grid reference: SD412483
- Civil parish: Pilling
- District: Wyre
- Shire county: Lancashire
- Region: North West
- Country: England
- Sovereign state: United Kingdom
- Post town: PRESTON
- Postcode district: PR3
- Dialling code: 01253
- Police: Lancashire
- Fire: Lancashire
- Ambulance: North West
- UK Parliament: Lancaster and Wyre

Stake Pool (also written as Stakepool) is a small rural hamlet in the county of Lancashire, England. It is on the Over Wyre region of the Fylde coast, west of Garstang near Pilling.
