= 1976 Wyre Borough Council election =

- 6 May 1976

All 55 seats to Wyre Borough Council 28 seats needed for a majority

	First party	Second party	Third party
Party	Conservative	Labour	Independent
Last election	46	2	7
Seats won	48	0	4
Seat change	▲2	▼2	▼3
Popular vote	28,614	5,841	4,313
	Fourth party	Fifth party
Party	Liberal	Residents
Last election	0	0
Seats won	2	1
Seat change	▲2	▲1
Popular vote	7,892	1,210
Leader after election
Conservative

The 1976 Wyre Borough Council election took place on 6 May 1976. This was on the same day as other local elections in England.

== Summary ==
The Conservatives retained a strong majority on the council, though they lost some ground to the Liberals and others compared to 1973.

=== Election result ===
1976 Wyre Borough Council
Party	Candidates	Seats	Gains	Losses	Net gain/loss	Seats %	Votes %	Votes	+/−
Conservative	54	48	6	4	▲2			28,614	
Liberal	18	2	2	0	▲2			7,892	
Labour	15	0	0	2	▼2			5,841	
Independent	6	4	3	6	▼3			4,13	
Residents	3	1	1	0	▲1			1,210	

== Ward Results ==
=== Bailey ===
Bailey (3 seats)
Party	Candidate	Votes	%	±%
Conservative	Chippendale H.	692	61.5	
Conservative	Mitchell G.	606		
Conservative	Storey K.	595		
Labour	Pilling J.	434	38.5	
Turnout		2,327	30.4	
Conservative hold				
Conservative hold				
Conservative hold				

=== Brock ===
Brock (1 seat)
Party	Candidate	Votes	%	±%
Conservative	Shorrock J.	441	68.1	
Liberal	Hall D.	207	31.9	
Turnout		648	56.3	
Conservative hold				

=== Calder ===
Calder (1 seat)
Party	Candidate	Votes	%	±%
Conservative	Ibison T.	439	74.0	
Liberal	Flood-Page J.	154	26.0	
Turnout		593	53.7	
Conservative hold				

=== Catterall ===
Catterall (1 seat)
Party	Candidate	Votes	%	±%
Conservative	Greenwood R.	562	63.7	
Liberal	Bradbrook J.	198	22.4	
Labour	Fleming A.	122	13.8	
Turnout		882	60.6	
Conservative hold				

=== Garstang ===
Garstang (2 seats)
Party	Candidate	Votes	%	±%
Liberal	Herbert P.	818	38.6	
Conservative	Moreland F.	796	37.5	
Conservative	Greenhow J.	749		
Residents	Walker R.	507	23.9	
Turnout		2,870	59.0	
Liberal gain from Independent				
Conservative gain from Independent				

=== Great Eccleston ===
Great Eccleston (1 seat)
Party	Candidate	Votes	%	±%
Residents	Anderton W.	495	51.2	
Conservative	Wild S.	471	48.8	
Turnout		966	52.9	
Residents gain from Conservative				

=== Hardhorn ===
Hardhorn (2 seats)
Party	Candidate	Votes	%	±%
Conservative	Stebbing C.	1,008	76.5	
Conservative	Bennett K.	988		
Liberal	Hall K. Ms.	309	23.5	
Turnout		2,305	46.8	
Conservative hold				
Conservative hold				

=== High Cross ===
High Cross (2 seats)
Party	Candidate	Votes	%	±%
Independent	Crampin D.	839	41.3	
Conservative	Anderson L. Ms.	739	36.4	
Conservative	Gorst J.	686		
Labour	Stephenson E. Ms.	278	13.7	
Liberal	Hodkinson M.	174	8.6	
Turnout		2,716	58.4	
Independent gain from Conservative				
Conservative hold				

=== Thornton Cleveleys: North ===
Thornton Cleveleys: North (3 seats)
Party	Candidate	Votes	%	±%
Conservative	Croft T.	1,122	46.2	
Conservative	Hough M. Ms.	969		
Conservative	Southworth W.	925		
Labour	Goldsmith W.	825	33.9	
Labour	Godfrey R.	751		
Labour	Wareing J.	669		
National Front	Farr R.	316	13.0	
Liberal	Oldham J.	168	6.9	
Turnout		5,745	51.2	
Conservative hold				
Conservative hold				
Conservative gain from Labour				

=== Thornton Cleveleys: North Central ===
Thornton Cleveleys: North Central (3 seats)
Party	Candidate	Votes	%	±%
Conservative	Croasdale C.	1,293	64.0	
Conservative	Blackburn V.	1,149		
Conservative	Crofts W.	1,145		
Labour	Lowther D.	587	29.0	
National Front	Ratcliffe G. Ms.	141	7.0	
Turnout		4,315	45.0	
Conservative hold				
Conservative hold				
Conservative hold				

=== Thornton Cleveleys: East ===
Thornton Cleveleys: East (3 seats)
Party	Candidate	Votes	%	±%
Conservative	Ashworth C.	1,415	43.1	
Conservative	Holt D.	1,389		
Independent	Dickens T.	1,267	38.6	
Liberal	Tait E. Ms.	462	14.1	
National Front	Tregower C.	136	4.1	
Turnout		4,669	43.7	
Conservative hold				
Conservative hold				
Independent gain from Conservative				

=== Thornton Cleveleys: South ===
Thornton Cleveleys: South (2 seats)
Party	Candidate	Votes	%	±%
Conservative	Ball W.	815	58.0	
Conservative	Goodier H.	782		
Labour	Brown P.	278	19.8	
Liberal	Tait W.	252	17.9	
National Front	Marsden C.	61	4.3	
Turnout		2,188	42.4	
Conservative hold				
Conservative hold				

=== Thornton Cleveleys: West ===
Thornton Cleveleys: West (2 seats)
Party	Candidate	Votes	%	±%
Conservative	Townend F.	839	52.3	
Independent	Hibbert F.	766	47.7	
Conservative	Brannan F.	570		
Turnout		2,175	46.2	
Conservative hold				
Independent hold				

=== Fleetwood: Mount ===
Fleetwood: Mount (2 seats)
Party	Candidate	Votes	%	±%
Conservative	Snape R.	Unopposed		
Conservative	Robinson B.	Unopposed		
Turnout		0	0.0	
Conservative hold				
Conservative hold				

=== Cabus ===
Cabus (1 seat)
Party	Candidate	Votes	%	±%
Conservative	Jackson J.	423	50.5	
Residents	Porter C.	208	24.8	
Liberal	Croft W.	207	24.7	
Turnout		838	54.4	
Conservative hold				

=== Hambleton ===
Hambleton (1 seat)
Party	Candidate	Votes	%	±%
Conservative	Williamson R.	631	68.7	
Liberal	Moat L. Ms.	287	31.3	
Turnout		918	45.7	
Conservative hold				

=== Pilling ===
Pilling (1 seat)
Party	Candidate	Votes	%	±%
Conservative	Hodgson E.	Unopposed		
Turnout		0	0.0	
Conservative hold				

=== Stalmine-With-Staynall ===
Stalmine-With-Staynall (1 seat)
Party	Candidate	Votes	%	±%
Conservative	Parkinson A.	547	87.7	
Liberal	Perkins H.	77	12.3	
Turnout		624	47.0	
Conservative hold				

=== Fleetwood: Park ===
Fleetwood: Park (3 seats)
Party	Candidate	Votes	%	±%
Conservative	Howard T.	541	57.1	
Conservative	O'Connor F.	524		
Conservative	Funk E.	519		
Labour	Long J.	407	42.9	
Turnout		1,991	26.4	
Conservative hold				
Conservative hold				
Conservative gain from Labour				

=== Rossall ===
Fleetwood: Rossall (3 seats)
Party	Candidate	Votes	%	±%
Conservative	Timms D.	Unopposed		
Conservative	Keating T.	Unopposed		
Conservative	Turek T.	Unopposed		
Turnout		0	0.0	
Conservative hold				
Conservative hold				
Conservative hold				

=== Breck ===
Poulton-le-Fylde: Breck (2 seats)
Party	Candidate	Votes	%	±%
Conservative	Macgregor B.	756	43.5	
Conservative	Mellalieu E.	706		
Liberal	Green D.	500	28.8	
Labour	Fox R.	481	27.7	
Turnout		2,443	55.4	
Conservative hold				
Conservative hold				

=== Carleton ===
Carleton (1 seat)
Party	Candidate	Votes	%	±%
Conservative	Davis J.	1,053	85.9	
Liberal	McGuire J. Ms.	173	14.1	
Turnout		1,226	50.6	
Conservative hold				

=== Pharos ===
Pharos (2 seats)
Party	Candidate	Votes	%	±%
Conservative	Atkinson E. Ms.	771	62.1	
Conservative	Cheetham V.	654		
Labour	Wright R.	471	37.9	
Turnout		1,896	37.8	
Conservative hold				
Conservative hold				

=== Preesall ===
Preesall (3 seats)
Party	Candidate	Votes	%	±%
Conservative	Wrathall W.	1,116	52.4	
Conservative	Millward F.	1,091		
Conservative	Davies M.	939		
Independent	Roberts J. Ms.	438	20.6	
Liberal	Nash M.	335	15.7	
Independent	Scott H.	286		
National Front	O'Donnell J.	241	11.3	
Turnout		4,446	50.9	
Conservative gain from Independent				
Conservative hold				
Conservative gain from Independent				

=== Tithebarn ===
Tithebarn (2 seats)
Party	Candidate	Votes	%	±%
Independent	Collins K.	717	39.7	
Conservative	McHugh V.	660	36.5	
Conservative	Downes R.	492		
Labour	Hogston A.	279	15.4	
Labour	Aspden J.	196		
Liberal	Sewell S. Ms.	151	8.4	
Turnout		2,495	52.8	
Independent gain from Conservative				
Conservative hold				

=== Victoria ===
Victoria (3 seats)
Party	Candidate	Votes	%	±%
Conservative	Grime J.	1,246	67.0	
Conservative	Powell G.	1,157		
Conservative	Simmons J.	1,101		
Liberal	Oldham V. Ms.	273	14.7	
Labour	Hanley J.	266	14.3	
National Front	Ratcliffe H.	74	4.0	
Turnout		4,117	47.8	
Conservative gain from Independent				
Conservative hold				
Conservative hold				

=== Warren ===
Warren (3 seats)
Party	Candidate	Votes	%	±%
Conservative	Hope E. Ms.	722	53.6	
Conservative	Formstone H.	716		
Conservative	Bradbury B. Ms.	669		
Labour	Jackson H.	626	46.4	
Turnout		2,733	40.9	
Conservative hold				
Conservative hold				
Conservative hold				

=== Wyresdale ===
Wyresdale (1 seat)
Party	Candidate	Votes	%	±%
Liberal	Nicholson W.	411	52.0	
Conservative	Livesey W.	379	48.0	
Turnout		790	60.7	
Liberal gain from Independent				
