= 2015 Wyre Borough Council election =

2015 UK local government election

Results of the 2015 Wyre Borough Council election

Local elections were held for Wyre Borough Council on 7 May 2015, the same day as the 2015 United Kingdom general election and other 2015 United Kingdom local elections. Local elections are held every four years with all councillors up for election in multi-member electoral wards.

Following the election, the composition of the council is now as follows:

| Party | Seats | ± |
|---|---|---|
| Conservative | 36 | –4 |
| Labour | 14 | -1 |

== Election result ==
Wyre Borough Council Election, 2015
| Party | Seats | Gains | Losses | Net gain/loss | Seats % | Votes % | Votes | +/− |
|---|---|---|---|---|---|---|---|---|
| Conservative | 36 | | | –4 | 72.00 | 60.23 | 59,545 | -3.25% |
| Labour | 14 | | | -1 | 28.00 | 31.44 | 32,855 | -3.69% |
| Green | 0 | 0 | 0 | 0 | 0.00 | 5.29 | 5,523 | +4.61% |
| UKIP | 0 | 0 | 0 | 0 | 0.00 | 4.62 | 4,824 | +2.09% |
| Independent | 0 | 0 | 0 | 0 | 0.00 | 4.00 | 4,181 | +2.54% |
| TUSC | 0 | 0 | 0 | 0 | 0.00 | 0.26 | 270 | N/A |

== Boundary review ==
The Local Government Boundary Commission for England reviewed the local boundaries of Wyre council in 2014.

The changes are made official by The Wyre (Electoral Changes) Order 2014.

Electoral wards in Wyre, 2015
| Ward | Number of councillors |
|---|---|
| Bourne | 3 |
| Breck | 2 |
| Brock with Catterall | 2 |
| Calder | 1 |
| Carleton | 2 |
| Cleveleys Park | 2 |
| Garstang | 3 |
| Great Eccleston | 2 |
| Hambleton and Stalmine | 2 |
| Hardhorn with High Cross | 3 |
| Jubilee | 2 |
| Marsh Mill | 3 |
| Mount | 2 |
| Park | 2 |
| Pharos | 2 |
| Pheasant's Wood | 1 |
| Pilling | 1 |
| Preesall | 3 |
| Rossal | 3 |
| Stanah | 2 |
| Tithebarn | 2 |
| Victoria and Norcross | 2 |
| Warren | 2 |
| Wyresdale | 1 |
