= Lorraine Beavers =

British politician

Lorraine Beavers MP
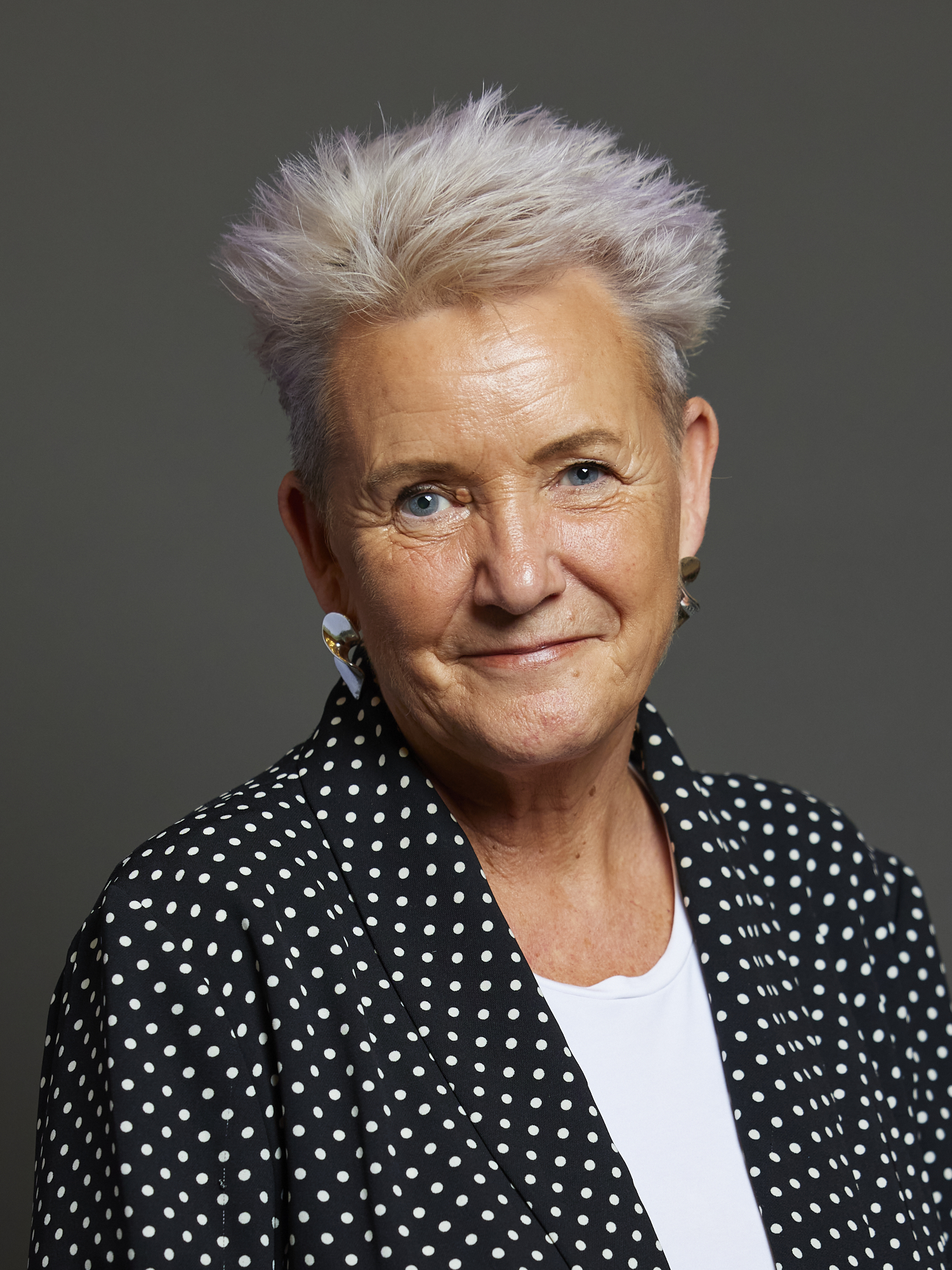
- Official portrait, 2024

Member of Parliament for Blackpool North and Fleetwood
- Incumbent
- Assumed office 4 July 2024
- Preceded by: Constituency established
- Majority: 4,647 (11.1%)

Lancashire County Councillor for Fleetwood East Fleetwood West (2013–2017)
- In office 2 May 2013 – 4 July 2024
- Preceded by: Clive Grunshaw
- Succeeded by: David Shaw

Wyre Borough Councillor for Park
- In office 4 May 2023 – 4 July 2024
- Preceded by: David O'Neill
- Succeeded by: Alice Jones

Personal details
- Born: Lorraine Shewan; November 1962 (age 63)
- Party: Labour
- Spouse: John Beavers (m. 1983)
- Children: 2

Lorraine Beavers (née Shewan; born November 1962) is a British Labour Party politician who has been MP for Blackpool North and Fleetwood since 2024. She was previously a Lancashire County Councillor for Fleetwood East (formerly Fleetwood West) and a Wyre Borough Councillor for Park.

== Early life ==
Lorraine Shewan was born in November 1962, the daughter of Ronnie and Brenda Shewan. She has a brother named Steven.

== Career ==
In the 2013 Lancashire County Council election, Beavers ran as the Labour Party candidate for Fleetwood West, winning the seat with a majority of 459 votes and succeeding the previous Labour councillor Clive Grunshaw. Following boundary changes, she ran for Fleetwood East in the 2017 County Council election, winning the seat with a majority of 727 votes. In the 2021 County Council election, Beavers held her Fleetwood East seat with an increased majority of 871 votes. In the 2023 Wyre Borough Council election, she stood as one of two Labour candidates for the Park ward, winning the seat from UKIP's David O'Neill.

In the 2024 general election, she was elected with a majority of 4,647 votes, unseating incumbent Conservative Paul Maynard. She became the first MP from Fleetwood. Beavers won the traditionally Conservative seat after a strong performance by the Reform UK candidate who came third. The Blackpool Gazette called Beavers "a well known figure in Fleetwood, having grown up in the town and served as a Labour councillor at town council, borough and county level."

In November 2024, Beavers voted in favour of the Terminally Ill Adults (End of Life) Bill, which proposes to legalise assisted suicide.

== Personal life ==
In 1983, she married John Beavers, who served in the British Army during the Falklands War and the Troubles. They have two children. Her father, Ronnie Shewan, died on 28 February 2024. Her mother Brenda died six months later on 14 August.

== Electoral history ==
=== House of Commons ===
General election 2024: Blackpool North and Fleetwood
Party	Candidate	Votes	%	±%
Labour	Lorraine Beavers	16,744	40.0	+4.4
Conservative	Paul Maynard	12,097	28.9	−26.9
Reform	Dan Barker	9,913	23.7	+22.0
Liberal Democrats	Bill Greene	1,318	3.2	−0.8
Green	Tina Rothery	1,269	3.0	+1.1
Monster Raving Loony	James Rust	174	0.4	New
Independent	Gita Gordon	148	0.4	New
SDP	Jeannine Cresswell	147	0.4	New
Majority		4,647	11.1	
Turnout		41,810	57.0	−9.4
Labour gain from Conservative		Swing		

=== Lancashire County Council ===
County Council election 2021: Fleetwood East
Party	Candidate	Votes	%	±%
Labour	Lorraine Beavers	1,740	53.33	
Conservative	Susan Hunt	869	26.63	
Independent	Brian Crawford	351	10.76	
Green	Michael Pickton	127	3.89	
Reform	Paul Sandham	102	3.13	
Liberal Democrats	Gerry Blaikie	43	1.32	
Majority		871	26.69	
Turnout		3,263	28.87	
Labour hold		Swing		

County Council election 2017: Fleetwood East
Party	Candidate	Votes	%	±%
Labour	Lorraine Beavers	2,028		
Conservative	David Shaw	1,301		
Green	Michael Pickton	107		
Independent	Ray Smith	93		
Majority		727		
Turnout		3,536	32.31	
Labour hold		Swing		

County Council election 2013: Fleetwood West
Party	Candidate	Votes	%	±%
Labour	Lorraine Beavers	1,364		
Conservative	Chris McConnachie	905		
UKIP	David Gerrard	683		
Communist	Jack Harrison	28		
Majority		459		
Turnout		2,988	32.36	
Labour gain from Conservative		Swing		

=== Wyre Borough Council ===
Borough Council election 2023: Park
Party	Candidate	Votes	%	±%
Labour	Lorraine Beavers	504	64.3	+28.5
Labour	Christine Smith	451	57.5	+21.3
Conservative	Geraldine Northwood	275	35.1	+14.0
Conservative	Susan Hunt	188	24.0	+6.1
Turnout		784	23.53	
Labour gain from UKIP		Swing		
Labour hold		Swing		

Parliament of the United Kingdom
New constituency	Member of Parliament for Blackpool North and Fleetwood; 2024–present	Incumbent
