= Pilling =

Village in Lancashire, England

Coordinates: 53.929°N 2.905°W

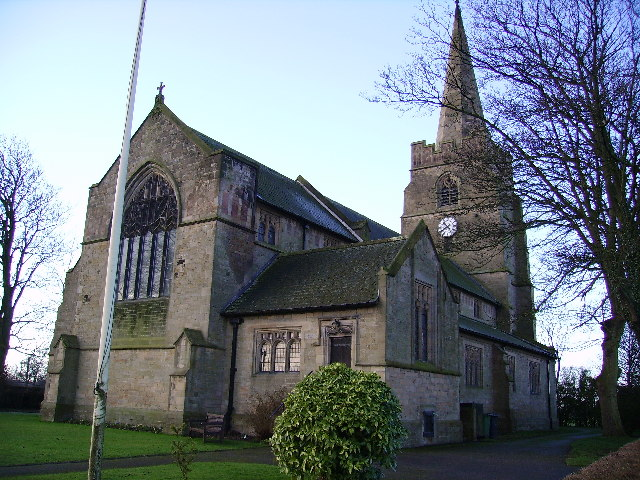
- St John the Baptist's Church, Pilling

- Location in Wyre Borough Location on the Fylde Location on Morecambe Bay Location within Lancashire
- Population: 2,323 (2021)
- OS grid reference: SD405485
  - London: 204 mi (329 km) SE
- Civil parish: Pilling
- District: Wyre
- Shire county: Lancashire
- Region: North West
- Country: England
- Sovereign state: United Kingdom
- Post town: PRESTON
- Postcode district: PR3
- Dialling code: 01253
- Police: Lancashire
- Fire: Lancashire
- Ambulance: North West
- UK Parliament: Lancaster and Wyre

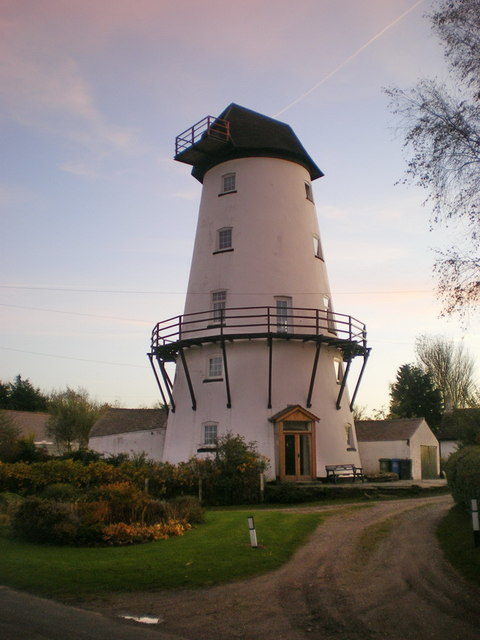
Damside Windmill

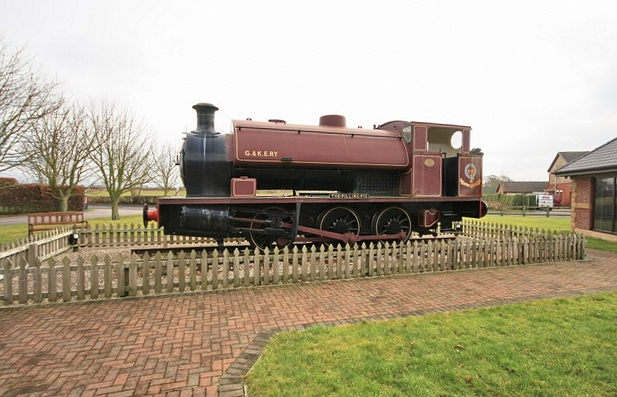
The Pilling Pig (0-6-0 locomotive)

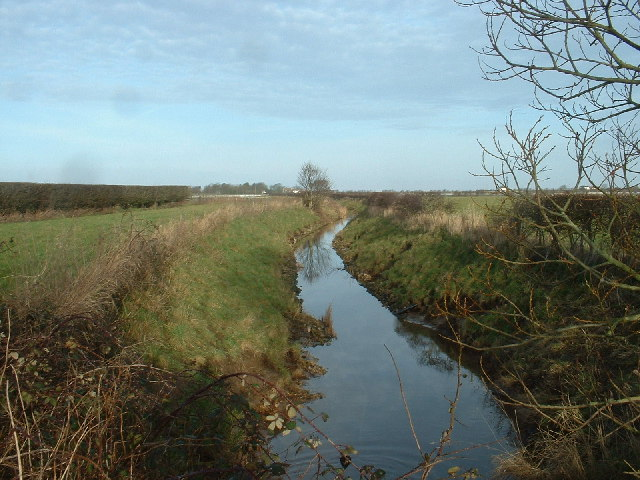
Cocker's Dyke, Pilling Moss

Pilling is a village and civil parish within the Wyre borough of Lancashire, England. It is 6.5 miles (10.5 km) north-northeast of Poulton-le-Fylde, 9.4 miles (15.1 km) south-southwest of Lancaster and 14.5 miles (23.3 km) northwest of Preston, in a part of the Fylde known as Over Wyre.

The civil parish of Pilling, which includes the localities of Stake Pool, Scronkey and Eagland Hill, had a total resident population of 1,739 in 2001, increasing to 2,020 at the 2011 Census and increasing to 2,323 in 2021. Populations in the 19th century ranged from 1,281 in 1851 to 1,572 in 1871.

== Toponymy ==
Eilert Ekwall suggests the name is Celtic, linking it with the Welsh place-name element "Pîl" (rendered as Pyl in Old English). This toponymy would suggest the settlement started as a tidal inlet used as a harbour. Ekwall suggested the geography of Pilling may be "accurately described as a pill".

The name appears as Pylin in 1246 and, if the name is indeed Celtic in origin, the termination is almost certainly the same as the common Welsh diminutive suffix "-yn", giving the meaning of "small harbour or inlet".

== History ==
Pilling is an ancient settlement, founded on what was essentially an "island" with the sea on one side and marsh on the others. Based on significant archeological findings, there is evidence of human activity within this area dating back to the Neolithic period.

Some of the materials that went into the extension of the Garstang railway from Pilling to Knott End-on-Sea came from Richard Fleetwood's first charity school at Preesall. The school had gradually become more and more dilapidated, so the contractors knocked it down and used the stones for the railway.

Damside Windmill, on Taylors Lane, was built in 1808.

Pilling's dialect was surveyed in 1976 as part of the Atlas Linguarum Europae.

"Pilling in Bloom" was a competition held in 2004.

== Geography ==
Pilling is an extensive mossland parish covering 3,387 hectares, situated on the southern corner of Morecambe Bay. Bus routes link Pilling to Lancaster, Knott End and Fleetwood.

== Governance ==
Since 1974, Pilling has formed part of the Wyre borough of Lancashire served by both Wyre Borough Council and Lancashire County Council, having previously (from 1894) lain within the Garstang Rural District of Lancashire. Pilling has its own Parish Council. The population of Pilling electoral ward in 2011 was 2,293. Pilling is within the constituency of Lancaster and Wyre which returned Cat Smith Labour Party (UK) as M.P. in 2024.

== Places of interest ==
Pilling has two pubs: The Elletson Arms in Stakepool and The Golden Ball in the village. There is a community area in the village, equipped with a pathway to Pilling Sands.

There are also several churches, including St John the Baptist Church (Church of England) in the village, St William's Church (Catholic) in Stakepool and the Pilling Methodist Church in the village.

There are two primary schools: Pilling St John's Church of England Primary School and St William's, both associated with the respective churches.

== Transport ==
As of March 2026, Stagecoach operates two routes in the village. The 88 to Knott End-on-Sea or Lancaster via Garstang or the 89 to Knott End-on-Sea or Lancaster. Both services operate every two hours.

== Notable people ==
- Ralph Slater (1754–1830), an English millwright, ostensibly known for his windmills on the Fylde

== See also ==
- Listed buildings in Pilling
