= Inskip, Lancashire =

Coordinates: 53.834°N 2.816°W

Inskip
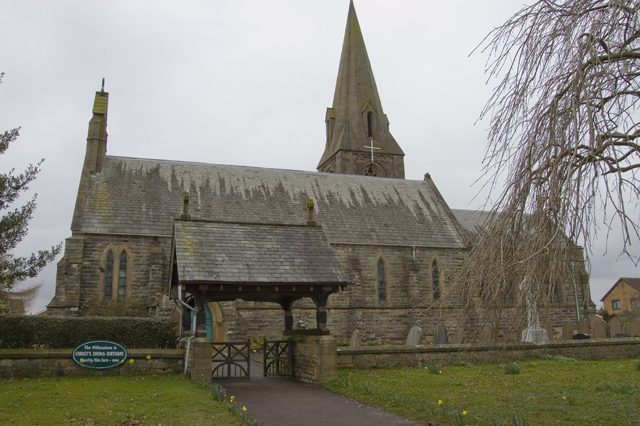
- St.Peter's Church, Inskip

- Shown within Wyre Borough Shown on the Fylde Location within Lancashire
- Population: 840 (parish) (2011 census)
- OS grid reference: SD463378
- Civil parish: Inskip-with-Sowerby
- District: Wyre
- Shire county: Lancashire
- Region: North West
- Country: England
- Sovereign state: United Kingdom
- Post town: PRESTON
- Postcode district: PR4
- Dialling code: 01772
- Police: Lancashire
- Fire: Lancashire
- Ambulance: North West
- UK Parliament: Lancaster and Wyre

Inskip is a small village in the Fylde area of Lancashire, England. It is part of the civil parish of Inskip-with-Sowerby. The village is close to the former RNAS Inskip airfield, which still serves the armed forces as a tri-service communication centre.

It is home to a Royal Air Force Air Cadets training centre.

== Toponymy ==
The first part of the name Inskip may be the Brittonic ïnïs meaning "island" (Welsh ynys), in place names generally referring to dry land in a marshy flood-prone area. Suffixed may be the Brittonic *cib meaning any rounded receptacle, presumably with some topographic sense, Old English -cy:pe or Anglo-Latin cuppa, with the sense "fish-trap" recorded for both.

== History ==
Inskip was listed in the Domesday Book of 1086 as Inscip. Its area was estimated in that survey to be two carucates of land. From 1281, the manor was owned by Richard Butler of Rawcliffe Hall, Out Rawcliffe. He received it from William de Carleton as a dowry of his bride, Alice. Butler died shortly after and in 1285 Henry de Kighley obtained Inskip and two-thirds of the manor of Great Eccleston from Butler's widow. Ownership descended within the Kighley family until it passed to William Cavendish, 1st Earl of Devonshire, the husband of Anne, one of two heiresses of Henry Kighley who died in 1567. It stayed within the main line of that family as they became the Dukes of Devonshire, until 1819 when it was given to a younger branch. In 1843 Edward Smith-Stanley, 13th Earl of Derby purchased the manor from the trustees of, the recently deceased, George Cavendish, 1st Earl of Burlington.

The Baptist chapel was built in 1817, after a division of the congregation at Elswick Chapel in 1794. The first Ordnance Survey map of the area, published in 1840s, shows that the houses to the west of Pinfold Lane represent the older part of the village. The Old Hall is identified as an inn along with another property set back from the road labelled as the Old Slip Inn. The area to the east, which today represents the majority of the settlement, contained only a handful of buildings at this time. This included a school house, now the site of School House Farm, and a since demolished, corn mill to the south of Mill House. A third inn called the Cavendish Arms was located directly north of the village's only present day public house, the Derby Arms.

Inskip's C of E church is dedicated to St Peter. It was built in 1848 and was financed by the Earl of Derby and William Hornby, then the vicar of St Michael's Church, St Michael's on Wyre. It is recorded in the National Heritage List for England as a designated Grade II listed building.

The airfield was a Royal Navy base named 'HMS Nightjar'. It saw intensive use from 1943-45 for flight training, and is now a military radio communications centre named MOD Inskip. Its four main radio masts are 600 ft (180 m) high and, illuminated by bright red warning lights, are visible from great distances. It is still used as a visual reporting point (VRP) for general aviation aircraft in the local Blackpool airspace.

== Transport ==
The location is served by Archway Travel service 74. The service runs from Preston bus station to Fleetwood every half an hour. This service is frequented by students of Cardinal Newman College from Inskip and its surrounding areas as a means to and from college.

== People ==
- Dr Albert George Long (1915-1999), palaeobotanist, was born and raised in Inskip.
- Inskip was the home of Nicola Bulley who disappeared, while walking her dog in St Michael's on Wyre, on 27 January 2023, and who was subsequently found to have accidentally drowned.

== See also ==
- Listed buildings in Inskip-with-Sowerby
