= Inskip-with-Sowerby =

Parish in Wyre Borough, Lancashire, England

Coordinates: 53.833°N 2.811°W

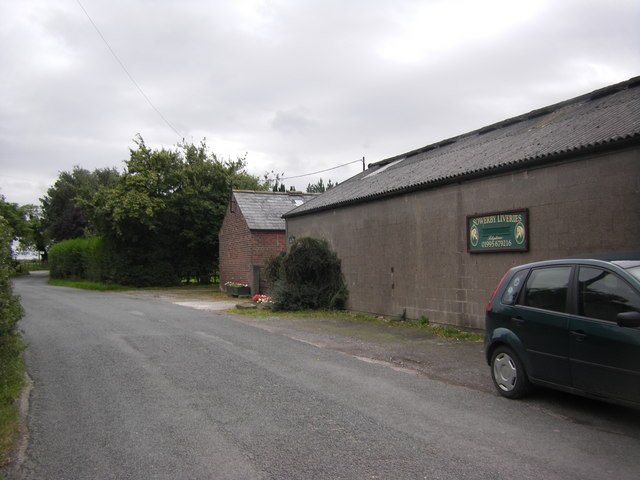
- Sowerby Hall Farm

- Shown within Wyre Borough Shown on the Fylde Location within Lancashire
- Area: 12.065 km^{2} (4.658 sq mi)
- Population: 840 (2011 census)
  - Density: 70/km^{2} (180/sq mi)
- OS grid reference: SD463378
- Civil parish: Inskip-with-Sowerby
- District: Wyre
- Shire county: Lancashire
- Region: North West
- Country: England
- Sovereign state: United Kingdom
- Post town: PRESTON
- Postcode district: PR4
- Dialling code: 01772
- Police: Lancashire
- Fire: Lancashire
- Ambulance: North West
- UK Parliament: Lancaster and Wyre

Inskip-with-Sowerby is a civil parish in the Borough of Wyre, in Lancashire, England. A part of the Fylde, the parish includes the village of Inskip and the hamlets Crossmoor to the west and Sowerby to the east. Also Inskip Moss Side lies about a mile north-west of the village at grid reference SD452391. In 2011 it had a population of 840.

The parish adjoins the Wyre parishes of Great Eccleston, Upper Rawcliffe-with-Tarnacre and Myerscough and Bilsborrow, along with Woodplumpton in the City of Preston and also Treales, Roseacre and Wharles and Elswick in the Borough of Fylde.

== Toponymy ==
The first part of the name Inskip may be the Brittonic ïnïs meaning "island" (Welsh ynys), in place names generally referring to dry land in a marshy flood-prone area. Suffixed may be the Brittonic *cib meaning any rounded receptacle, presumably with some topographic sense, Old English -cy:pe or Anglo-Latin cuppa, with the sense "fish-trap" recorded for both. Sowerby means a settlement standing on marshy ground, from the Old Norse words saurr and byr.

== History ==
Inskip was listed in the Domesday Book of 1086 as Inscip along with Sowerby Sorbi, within the Amounderness Hundred. Inskip's area was estimated in that survey to be two carucates of land, with Sowerby half the size. Both manors belonging to Tostig Godwinson prior to the Norman Conquest.

Inskip's church is dedicated to St Peter. It was built in 1848 and was financed by the Earl of Derby and William Hornby, then the vicar of St Michael's Church, St Michael's on Wyre and later inaugural Archdeacon of Lancaster.

A military radio communications facility has been developed on the former RNAS Inskip airfield in the Higham area to the south-east of the parish (extending into Treales, Roseacre and Wharles parish). It was known as 'HMS Nightjar' during World War I and World War II.

An ancient area of common land at Carr House Green in the south of the parish is today owned by the parish council. 10 local properties still have legal rights to graze cattle and geese on the open grassland, but it is now used as a recreation site.

== Governance ==
Inskip-with-Sowerby was once a township in the ancient parish of St Michael's on Wyre. This became a civil parish in 1866, forming part of the Garstang Rural District from 1894 till 1974. It has since become part of the Borough of Wyre.

Along with Great Eccleston, Upper Rawcliffe-with-Tarnacre, Kirkland and Out Rawcliffe, Inskip-with-Sowerby forms part of the Great Eccleston ward of Wyre Borough Council.

== Transport ==
The village has 1 bus route operated by Archway Travel to either Preston or Fleetwood. As of March 2026, this service operates hourly.

== Media gallery ==
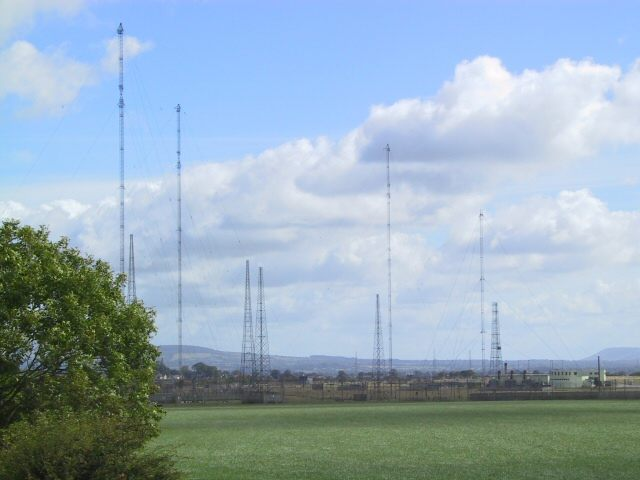
MOD antenna farm

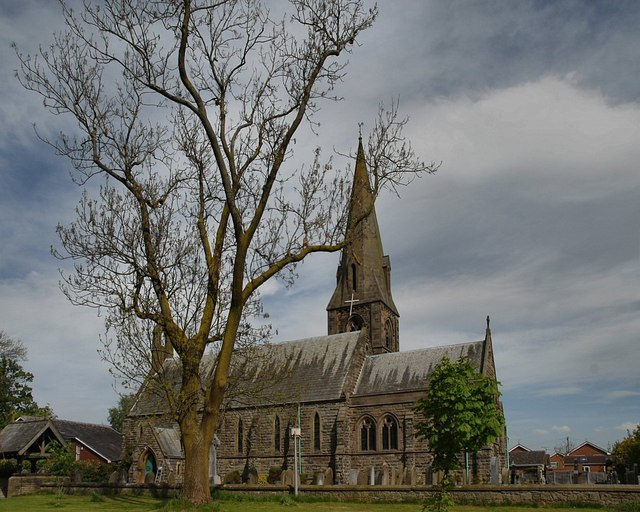
St. Peter's church, Inskip

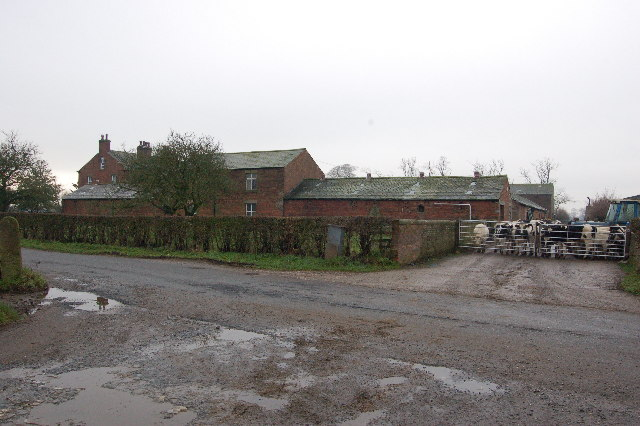
New Hall Farm, Sowerby

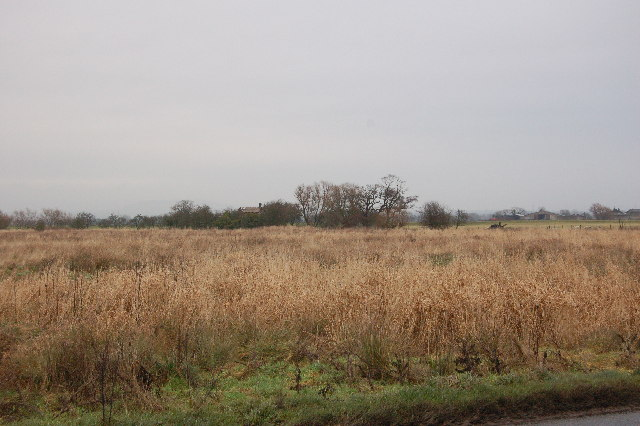
Carr House Green Common

== See also ==
- Listed buildings in Inskip-with-Sowerby
