= Kirkland, Lancashire =

Civil parish in Lancashire, England

Coordinates: 53.880°N 2.791°W

Kirkland
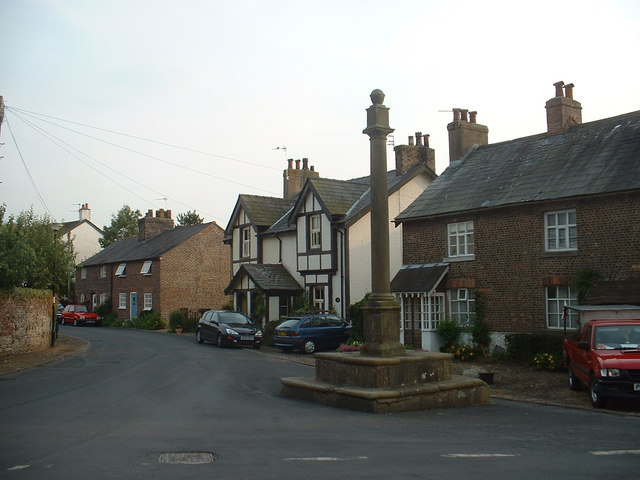
- The 18th-century dial post, Churchtown

- Shown within Wyre Borough Shown on the Fylde Location within Lancashire
- Population: 282 (2021)
- OS grid reference: SD479438
- Civil parish: Kirkland
- District: Wyre
- Shire county: Lancashire
- Region: North West
- Country: England
- Sovereign state: United Kingdom
- Post town: PRESTON
- Postcode district: PR3
- Dialling code: 01995
- Police: Lancashire
- Fire: Lancashire
- Ambulance: North West
- UK Parliament: Lancaster and Wyre

Kirkland is a civil parish, located on the banks of the River Wyre, midway between Preston and Lancaster, in the English county of Lancashire. It is also the historic name of what is now the village of Churchtown, within the parish. It is part of the Wyre district. In 2001 the parish had a population of 343, decreasing to 314 at the 2011 census. It decreased again in the 2021 census to 282.

== History ==
Kirkland has a long history centred on its Grade I listed building, St Helen's, the parish church of Garstang St Helen (or Churchtown) and once known as the Cathedral of the Fylde. The church features:

- a "lepers' window" or "squint" to enable those unfortunates an opportunity to attend its services;
- a grave marker for the village's only victim of the Black Plague;
- a large rafter, once known as the "new beam", supposedly presented to the parish by King Henry VIII at the time of the Reformation.

There are significant pointers such as a circular churchyard with several yew trees to its original use as a Druid temple. It was believed by some that the area may have been the site where Christian missionaries from Ireland first set foot in Lancashire at the end of the navigational portion of the River Wyre which flows to the Irish Sea some 14 miles (23 km) away. St Helen's is one of only two Grade I listed buildings in the Borough of Wyre.

Although known as "The Cross", the village has an 18th-century Grade II listed dialpost with a sundial at its head, at the top of Church Street. There used to be two pubs: the Punchbowl and the Horns Inn. The Punchbowl has now closed.

Kirkland was once a township in the ancient parish of Garstang. This became a civil parish in 1866, forming part of the Garstang Rural District from 1894 till 1974. It has since become part of the Borough of Wyre.

== Geography ==
Along with Great Eccleston, Out Rawcliffe, Inskip-with-Sowerby and Upper Rawcliffe-with-Tarnacre, Kirkland forms part of the Great Eccleston ward of Wyre Borough Council.

== Transport ==
The village has 1 bus routing serving it run by Stagecoach in Lancaster.

Number	Destination	Direction
42	Blackpool	West
42	Lancaster	North

== See also ==
- Listed buildings in Kirkland, Lancashire
