= Upper Rawcliffe-with-Tarnacre =

Civil parish in Lancashire, England

Coordinates: 53.8663°N 2.8182°W

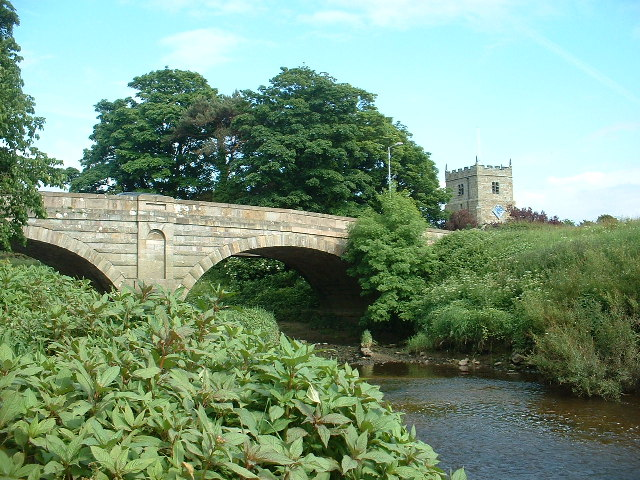
- The River Wyre at St Michael's on Wyre

- Shown within Wyre Borough Shown on the Fylde Location within Lancashire
- Area: 15.4676 km^{2} (5.9721 sq mi)
- Population: 629 (2011 census)
  - Density: 41/km^{2} (110/sq mi)
- District: Wyre
- Shire county: Lancashire
- Region: North West
- Country: England
- Sovereign state: United Kingdom
- Post town: PRESTON
- Postcode district: PR3
- Police: Lancashire
- Fire: Lancashire
- Ambulance: North West

Upper Rawcliffe-with-Tarnacre is a civil parish on the Fylde, in the Borough of Wyre, in Lancashire, England. It had a population of 604 in 2001, increasing to 629 at the 2011 Census. The only settlements in the parish are the village of St Michael's on Wyre and the tiny hamlet of Ratten Row. The River Wyre passes through the parish, and the River Brock joins the Wyre on the parish boundary.

Upper Rawcliffe-with-Tarnacre was once a township in the ancient parish of St Michael's on Wyre. This became a civil parish in 1866, forming part of the Garstang Rural District from 1894 till 1974. It has since become part of the Borough of Wyre.

Along with Great Eccleston, Kirkland, Out Rawcliffe and Inskip-with-Sowerby, Upper Rawcliffe-with-Tarnacre forms part of the Great Eccleston ward of Wyre Borough Council.

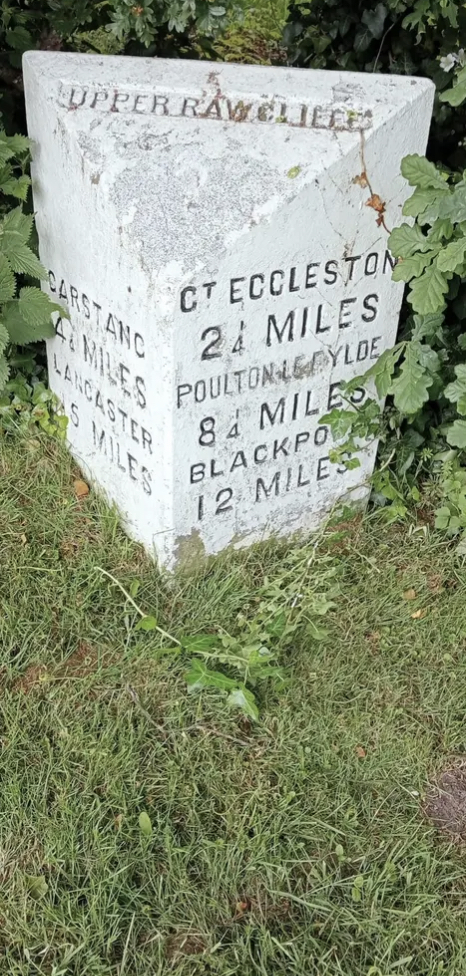
Milestone

== See also ==
- Listed buildings in Upper Rawcliffe-with-Tarnacre
