= Listed buildings in Upper Rawcliffe-with-Tarnacre =

Upper Rawcliffe-with-Tarnacre is a civil parish in the Wyre district of Lancashire, England. It contains nine buildings that are recorded in the National Heritage List for England as designated listed buildings. Of these, one is listed at Grade I, the highest of the three grades, and the others are at Grade II, the lowest grade. The parish includes the village of St Michael's on Wyre and is otherwise rural. The River Wyre passes through the parish, and a bridge crossing it is listed. The other listed buildings are a church and associated mounting block, a country house, a pair of gate piers, a war memorial, two milestones, and a combined milestone and boundary stone.

== Key ==
Grade	Criteria
I	Buildings of exceptional interest, sometimes considered to be internationally important
II	Buildings of national importance and special interest

== Buildings ==
Name and location	Photograph	Date	Notes	Grade
St Michael's Church; 53.86281°N 2.81963°W		c. 1500	The church retains some fabric dating from the 13th century, and was altered during the 17th century. It is built in sandstone, and consists of a west tower, a nave and chancel under a continuous roof, a south aisle, a south porch, a short north aisle, and a north chapel. The west tower has three stages and contains angle buttresses, a west doorway with a Tudor arched head, a six-light west window, also with a Tudor arched head, and an embattled parapet. The south aisle also has an embattled parapet. The east chancel window has three lights, and contains Perpendicular tracery.	I
Gate piers 53.86157°N 2.81465°W	—	18th century	A pair of gate piers in sandstone with a square plan. Each pier has a moulded base and cornice and a ball finial.	II
Mounting block 53.86278°N 2.81980°W	—	18th century (possible)	The mounting block adjoins the southwestern buttress of the tower of St Michael's Church. It is in sandstone, and consists of a single block of stone cut into three steps.	II
St. Michael's Bridge; 53.86329°N 2.82029°W		1803	The bridge carries Blackpool Lane across the River Wyre. It is in sandstone, and consists of two elliptical arches, with alternate rusticated voussoirs, and triangular cutwaters. The bridge has a solid parapet, a string course and weathered coping.	II
The Old House; 53.86329°N 2.81461°W	—	Early 19th century	A country house, rendered with sandstone dressings and a slate roof, in two storeys with an attic. The east front is symmetrical with a central two-storey bow window flanked by two bays on each side, and with an additional bay at the right end. The entrance front on the west has a two-storey porch with corner pilasters, a cornice, and stepped parapet. The doorway has an architrave and a porch with two Ionic columns. The windows are sashes.	II
Milestone; 53.86207°N 2.82576°W	—	19th century	The milestone is in sandstone and has a triangular plan with a sloping top. The top is inscribed with "UPPER RAWCLIFFE", one face is inscribed with the distances in miles to Garstang and Lancaster, and on the other face are the distances to Great Eccleston, Poulton-le-Fylde, and Blackpool.	II
Milestone; 53.85830°N 2.84545°W	—	19th century	The milestone is in sandstone and has a triangular plan with a sloping top. The top is inscribed with "UPPER RAWCLIFFE", one face is inscribed with the distances in miles to Garstang and Lancaster, and on the other face are the distances to Great Eccleston, Poulton-le-Fylde, and Blackpool.	II
Milestone and boundary stone 53.87128°N 2.81214°W	—	19th century	The milestone and boundary stone is in sandstone and has a triangular plan with a sloping top. The top is inscribed with "CATTERALL" and "UPPER RAWCLIFFE". One face is inscribed with the distances in miles to Great Eccleston, Poulton-le-Fylde, and Blackpool, and on the other face are the distances to Garstang and Lancaster.	II
War memorial 53.86288°N 2.82004°W		c. 1920	The war memorial is in an enclosure set into the churchyard of St Michael's Church. It is in white granite, and consists of a Celtic cross on a rough-hewn tapering plinth. On the cross are interlace designs in low relief, and on the shaft is an inscription. On the plinth are the names of those lost in the First World War, and at the foot of the memorial is a tablet with the names of those lost in later conflicts.	
