= Inskip =

Inskip may refer to:

- Inskip, Lancashire, a village in England
  - RNAS Inskip (HMS Nightjar), a Royal Navy installation near Inskip, Lancashire, England
- Inskip, California, a small town in the United States
- Inskip Peninsula in Queensland, Australia
- Inskip (surname)
