= Listed buildings in Out Rawcliffe =

Out Rawcliffe is a civil parish in the Wyre district of Lancashire, England. It contains five listed buildings that are recorded in the National Heritage List for England. All the listed buildings are designated at Grade II, the lowest of the three grades, which is applied to "buildings of national importance and special interest". The parish, which is almost completely rural, contains the small village of Out Rawcliffe. The listed buildings consist of a farmhouse, a country house, a church, a former vicarage, and an animal pound.

== Buildings ==
Name and location	Photograph	Date	Notes
Liscoe; 53.85939°N 2.93915°W	—	Early to mid 17th century	A farmhouse in rendered brick with a slate roof, in two storeys. The original part has two bays, two bays have been added to the left, and at the rear are two wings. On the front is a stair outshut. Inside the house is a bressumer and two blocked mullioned windows.
Rawcliffe Hall; 53.86898°N 2.88996°W	—	17th century (possible)	A former country house containing material from the late 16th century, later altered and used for other purposes. It is partly in brick, partly timber-framed, largely roughcast, and with slate roofs. The house has two storeys with attics, and has a P-shaped plan including a courtyard. In the south range is a full-height gabled entrance bay, and its rear is timber-framed with mullioned windows. In the west and east ranges are full-height canted embattled bay windows.
St John's Church; 53.87410°N 2.89571°W		1837–38	The church is in red brick with sandstone dressings and a slate roof. It has a rectangular plan, with corner buttresses rising to form square turrets. Along the sides of the church are eight bays containing two tiers of round-headed windows. At the west end is a round-headed doorway flanked by windows, and above are nine lancet windows, alternately blank. At the east end are three stepped lancets. Inside the church is a west gallery and a three-decker pulpit.
Old Vicarage; 53.87413°N 2.89522°W	—	c. 1840	The vicarage has later been used as a farmhouse. It is in red brick with sandstone dressings and a slate roof. The house consists of a main range facing south, and a rear wing. The south front has two bays with pilaster strips and a corbel table. The windows are sashes with mullions and hood moulds. On the ground floor of the west front is a three-bay blank arcade with round arches.
Cattle pound 53.87260°N 2.91328°W	—	19th century	The cattle pound is in sandstone and has a circular plan. The walls are about 2 metres (6 ft 7 in) high, and have triangular coping. There is an entrance on the west side with a triangular lintel.
