= Ritzi =

British band

Ritzi are a British band formed in 1975, from The Fylde area of Lancashire, England. They are best known for their only charting single, "Too Much Fandango", which had its greatest success in Australia in 1976, peaking on the Australian Kent Music Report at number 28.

The original line-up consisted of Phil Free (real name Philip Enright, on bass guitar/vocals), Pete Hughes (guitar/vocals), Mick Carrol (vocals/percussion) and Pete Long (aka The Fong) (drums/percussion). Kev Brennan of Music For Parties, New Zealand, was hired as the support DJ on many of the band's gigs throughout the 1970s and 1980s.

Following the success of "Too Much Fandango", Ritzi remained relatively dormant, until 2006 when it was announced that they would be performing again.

Preceding the new performances' announcement, Phil Free suffered a near fatal heart attack at his North England home in May 2006.

In the summer of 2009, Ritzi began gigging again, this time after recruiting new drummer Chris Jopson.
