= Listed buildings in Great Eccleston =

Great Eccleston is a civil parish in the Wyre district of Lancashire, England. It contains eight listed buildings that are recorded in the National Heritage List for England. All the listed buildings are designated at Grade II, the lowest of the three grades, which is applied to "buildings of national importance and special interest". The parish contains the village of Great Eccleston and surrounding countryside. The listed building comprise houses, farmhouses, a dovecote, a milestone, a church, and a milestone.

== Buildings ==
Name and location	Photograph	Date	Notes
Willow Cottage Restaurant; 53.85487°N 2.87330°W	—	17th century	Originally a house, later altered and used as a restaurant. It is rendered and has 1 1/2 storeys. The windows have plain reveals, and to the left is a modern bow window.
Hodgkinson Farmhouse; 53.84895°N 2.85156°W	—	c. 1700 (possible)	The farmhouse is in rendered clay and brick and has a thatched roof covered by corrugated iron. It has one storey with attics, and consists of a one-bay main range, and a cross wing. In the main range is a dormer, and in the cross wing is a stair window. All the windows are modern.
Seed's Farmhouse; 53.84976°N 2.83330°W	—	Early 18th century (probable)	The farmhouse is in sandstone in the ground floor, with brick above, and has a thatched roof covered by corrugated iron. It has two storeys and three bays. Most of the windows are horizontal sliding sashes, and the doorway has a modern timber porch.
Western house 53.85450°N 2.87279°W	—	Early 18th century (possible)	A rendered house with a thatched roof covered by corrugated iron, and in two storeys. It has a main range of two bays and a cross wing to the left. The windows are modern. In the cross wing is a bay window on the ground floor, and a window with a segmental head above.
Dovecote; 53.85346°N 2.87427°W	—	Late 18th century	The dovecote is in red brick, and has a pyramidal roof of Welsh slate that was replaced in the late 20th century. It has a square plan, and on the roof is a cupola with an ogee roof. On the east side is a doorway with a blocked fanlight and a window. At the level of the head of the doorway is a double row of tiles forming a rat course. Inside are ten rows of nesting boxes. The dovecote is also a Scheduled Monument.
Milestone; 53.85552°N 2.86711°W	—	19th century	The milestone is in sandstone and has a triangular plan. It is inscribed with the name of the parish, and with the distances in miles to Garstang and Lancaster on one side, and to Great Eccleston, Poulton-le-Fylde, and Blackpool on the other.
Pinfold; 53.85475°N 2.87572°W	—	19th century (probable)	The pinfold is in sandstone and has roughly a trapezoid plan. The walls are about 2 metres (6 ft 7 in) high with copings, some rounded and others triangular, and there is an entrance on the north side.
St Anne's Church; 53.84814°N 2.88140°W		1884–85	The church incorporates earlier material. It is in sandstone with a slate roof, and consists of a west tower, a nave, a south porch, and a chancel. The tower is in three stages and has an embattled parapet on a corbel table. The windows are lancets, and the east window consists of three stepped lancets. Above the porch door is a re-set inscribed plaque from an older church on the site. Inside the church is a west gallery, and an open timber roof.
