= William Hornby =

William Hornby may refer to:

- William Hornby (governor) (1723–1803), Governor of Bombay, 1771–1784
- William Henry Hornby (1805–1884), British industrialist, Member of Parliament (MP) for Blackburn 1857–1869
- Sir William Hornby, 1st Baronet (1841–1928), his son, British MP for Blackburn, 1886–1910
- William Hornby (Warrington MP), British Member of Parliament for Warrington
- William Hornby (priest) (1848–1932), Archdeacon of Lancaster, 1870–1895
