= Death of Nicola Bulley =

2023 death of English woman

- Publicity photo of Nicola Bulley
- Location: St Michael's on Wyre, Lancashire, England
- Cause: Accidental drowning
- Reported missing: 27 January 2023
- Body found: 19 February 2023

On 27 January 2023, 45-year-old British woman Nicola Bulley disappeared whilst walking her dog in the village of St Michael's on Wyre, Lancashire, England. Lancashire Constabulary said that there was no evidence of either suspicious activity or third-party involvement in the disappearance and quickly stated that their working hypothesis was that she had fallen into the River Wyre. However, an extensive search of the river and surrounding land involving police divers, helicopters, sniffer dogs and drones found no body.

On 19 February, two walkers found Bulley's body in the river, about one mile (1.5 kilometres) downstream of St Michael's on Wyre. The inquest, which concluded in June 2023, determined that Bulley's death was due to accidental drowning.

The police were initially criticised for their handling of the case, including releasing private details of Bulley's health and poorly communicating with the media which resulted in public speculation. Members of the public, particularly users of social media, were also criticised for travelling to the area during the search, distracting the investigation with what the police described as "[playing] private detectives".

== Background ==
Nicola Bulley was born in 1977 and grew up near Chelmsford in Essex. She was educated at William de Ferrers School in South Woodham Ferrers and at Thurrock Technical College from 1994 to 1996; she later moved to Lancashire. Bulley and her partner were parents to two school-age daughters, and the family lived in the village of Inskip where Bulley worked as a mortgage adviser. Bulley had experienced an issue relating to alcohol and she had been receiving treatment for her perimenopause condition. Police and health professionals had attended the family home on 10 January to respond to a "concern for welfare".

== Disappearance ==
On Friday 27 January 2023, Bulley drove from her home to the nearby village of St Michael's on Wyre, where, after dropping her children off at school at approximately 08:40 GMT, she walked along the River Wyre with her springer spaniel. At 08:53, Bulley sent an email to her employer. At 08:57 she sent a text to a friend to arrange a meet-up for their children that week. She then joined a Microsoft Teams call at 09:01, keeping her phone's camera and microphone disengaged.

Bulley was last seen at approximately 09:10 on a riverside field walking with her dog off its lead. At 09:20, Bulley's phone was believed to be in the vicinity of a riverside bench. At 09:30, the Teams call ended. At 09:33, a passer-by discovered the phone (which was still connected to the call (Note: Microsoft Teams allows a single user to remain connected to a meeting for ten minutes after its end before the system deems the meeting "stale" and automatically terminates it.)) on the bench. Bulley's dog was found alone near the bench and showed no signs of having been in the river.

== Investigation ==
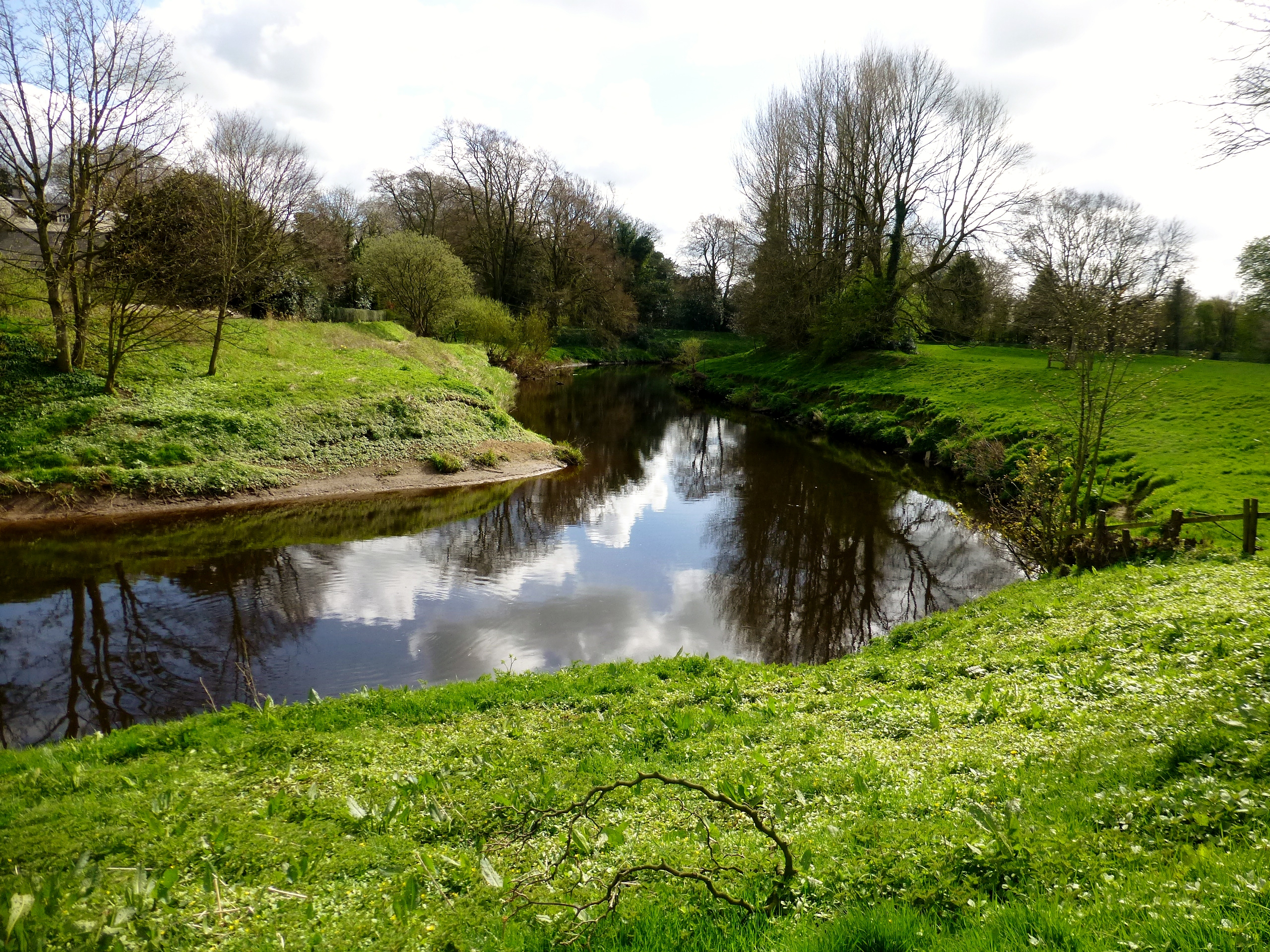
The River Wyre, upstream of St Michael's on Wyre, near to where Bulley's dog and phone were found

=== Police ===
After the report of Bulley's disappearance, Lancashire Constabulary immediately graded Bulley as "high risk" because of "specific vulnerabilities" due to "significant issues with alcohol which were brought on by her ongoing struggles with the menopause". The classification increased the priority and resources assigned to the investigation.

The search for Bulley was initially focused on tracing a potential witness, a woman in a red coat spotted on CCTV walking a dog near the site of Bulley's disappearance. She was later identified as a 68-year-old woman, who confirmed she had not seen Bulley. On 4 February, police released a CCTV image of another woman who was seen, pushing a pram, in the area at the time of Bulley's disappearance; the police later reported that the woman had come forward very quickly.

Searches of the river and riverbank from St Michael's on Wyre to the sea found nothing of interest. On 3 February, Lancashire Constabulary stated that they believed the circumstances of Bulley's disappearance were not suspicious, nor criminal and did not involve a third party. The police's theory that Bulley had fallen into the River Wyre was met with criticism and scepticism by Bulley's family and friends. They stated that the hypothesis was unsupported by evidence, and Bulley's partner did not believe that she had entered the river. A Lancashire Constabulary superintendent reiterated that this remained the force's working hypothesis, and they were "as sure as [they] can be" that Bulley had not left the area.

The search involved police divers, a helicopter, sniffer dogs, and aerial drones, and was assisted by His Majesty's Coastguard, the mountain rescue service, and fire and rescue crews. Members of the public helped with the search, and police requested the community look out for the clothing Bulley was known to be wearing. She had worn her Fitbit, although its last data synchronization was before her disappearance and its account was not useful to the investigation. On 9 February, the search moved to Morecambe Bay, the mouth of the River Wyre.

At a press conference held on 15 February by Assistant Chief Constable Peter Lawson and Detective Superintendent Rebecca Smith, Lancashire Constabulary stated that there remained no evidence of criminal activity nor of third-party involvement in Bulley's disappearance. Smith was critical of users of social media such as TikTok, who had visited the area "[playing] private detectives"; she stated that false information, speculation and rumour had been detrimental to the police investigation and had adversely affected Bulley's family. Later the same day, the police clarified comments in the conference referring to Bulley's "specific vulnerabilities" by specifying that they related to alcohol and the menopause, and also stated that police had attended a concern for welfare report at her home on 10 January. Police also put in place a dispersal order, after social media video-makers caused a nuisance and disrupted the investigation.

=== Private search team ===
Peter Faulding led an independent search effort by his company, Specialist Group International, that used side-scan sonar. He described Bulley's disappearance as "strange" and said that in his 20-year career he had "never seen something so unusual". After an extensive search of the River Wyre, the underwater team concluded their operation. Faulding said that his team were unable to locate her in the area of the River Wyre where detectives thought she may have entered the water, stating: "That area is completely negative—there is no sign of Nicola in that area. The main focus will be the police investigation down the river, which leads out to the estuary." Faulding believed it was unlikely that Bulley had been swept out to sea, adding, "My personal view is that I think it is a long way to go in a tidal river."

== Recovery of body and inquest ==
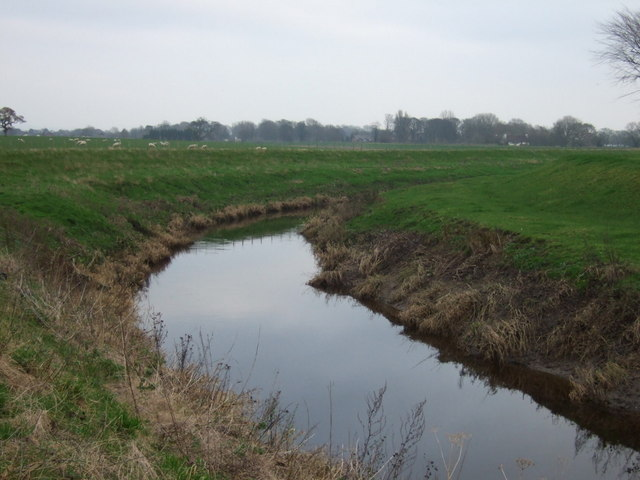
The Wyre downstream of St Michael's on Wyre, near to where Bulley's body was found

On 19 February 2023, a man and woman walking their dog discovered Bulley's body adjacent to a fallen tree in the River Wyre, about one mile (1.6 km) downstream from St Michael's on Wyre. The couple informed the police, and the body was subsequently recovered from among reeds and undergrowth. Police set up a tent beside the river and a police helicopter operated above the area. Some members of the public tried to take photos of the body by climbing over a fence and pretending to be journalists; a man was later arrested and bailed, for a malicious communications offence and perverting the course of justice relating to him recording video within the police cordon.

On 20 February, Lancashire Constabulary confirmed that the body was Bulley's. She was identified from her dental records. The cause of death was not immediately established. An inquest was opened on 22 February, at Preston coroner's court, before senior coroner James Adeley. Once identification was confirmed he adjourned proceedings. On 11 April, Lancashire Police divers returned to the river under direction of the coroner.

On 26 June, the inquest heard that Bulley's mobile phone and Fitbit watch data suggested she entered the water at 09:22. The cause of death was established as accidental drowning, with no evidence that Bulley had been harmed in any way before she entered the water.

== Criticism of the media and of Lancashire Police ==
After confirming Bulley's death at a press conference, Lancashire Police read a statement from Bulley's family in which they condemned the actions of Sky News and ITV News for making contact directly with them when they had expressly requested privacy, describing the conduct of media outlets as "shameful". The family also criticised people who accused Bulley's partner of involvement in her disappearance. Baroness Wheatcroft, former editor of the Sunday Telegraph, said the media had invaded the family's privacy, calling it a "feeding frenzy". On 21 February, the broadcasting regulator Ofcom said it was "extremely concerned" to hear complaints about media conduct made by Bulley's family, and that it had written to both ITV and Sky News to ask them to explain their actions.

The police's revelation of Bulley's health details was criticised by several politicians. Home Secretary Suella Braverman asked the force to justify its decision. Vera Baird commented that, if publicising the details would have aided the search, it should have been done immediately and said otherwise she thought it sexist. Prime Minister Rishi Sunak and Leader of the Opposition Keir Starmer both expressed concerns; other critics included Leader of the House of Commons Penny Mordaunt, and MPs Stella Creasy and Alicia Kearns. Lancashire Constabulary's media strategy as a whole was criticised as having encouraged rumour and speculation. After a review of the force's disclosures during the case, the Information Commissioner's Office decided to take no enforcement action, with more details expected to be released following the inquest in June.

Guardian columnist Zoe Williams called police discussion of Bulley's health "the worst judgment call on the police's part [...] There was no call for that level of detail; it appeared to be introduced purely to discredit her as a rational actor." Williams extended her criticism to the general public, via social media, which reacted entirely contrarily, in her opinion, to how reason and tact would dictate in the early stages of the case when police released minimal information. "Everything the police left unsaid opened a vacuum, into which armchair detectives and keyboard warriors piled with conspiracies, speculation and fantasy. The glee and shamelessness of people broadcasting their vigilante investigations was chilling", extending to one YouTuber broadcasting himself joining the search, getting arrested on a public order charge for doing so, and then broadcasting himself again getting fined. When the theories circulating forced the police to hold their 15 February news conference to debunk them, she noted, two Daily Mail columnists tweeted links to columns criticising Detective Superintendent Smith for having worn a sleeveless dress. "It's a crowded field but this may have been a low point for traditional media," she wrote.

Reviews of the police's contact with Bulley earlier in January were opened by the Independent Office for Police Conduct after self-referral by the Lancashire Constabulary. It concluded in May, finding "no misconduct or wrongdoing", but did identify two areas for improvement. A separate review by the College of Policing was initiated at the request of the Lancashire Police and Crime Commissioner, Andrew Snowden. It would investigate aspects of the investigation and search for Bulley; it produced a report in November (see below). Lancashire Constabulary also began an internal review into their handling of the case. Later in February, Specialist Group International, who had conducted the unsuccessful sonar searches of the river, were removed from the National Crime Agency's Expert Advisers Database, pending a review of the case by the NCA.

On 3 October 2024, an hour-long documentary The Search for Nicola Bulley aired on BBC One, with exclusive access to Bulley's family and those at the centre of the case, including Lancashire Police, journalists, the person who found her body and social media creators. The programme received criticism from some viewers for the amount of time it spent discussing the involvement of social media amateur sleuths.

== Independent review ==
In November 2023, a report of an independent review of Lancashire Police's handling of Bulley's disappearance was published. The report criticised the force for publicly revealing details of Bulley's health, but also for failing to adequately brief the media which led to public speculation. It concluded that senior staff at the force made errors of judgement in transparency and in the failure to support lower-ranked officers, and that the involvement of the private search team undermined the police's work as well as the public's trust in the force.

== See also ==
- List of solved missing person cases (2020s)
