= Elswick, Lancashire =

Village and civil parish in Lancashire, England

Elswick
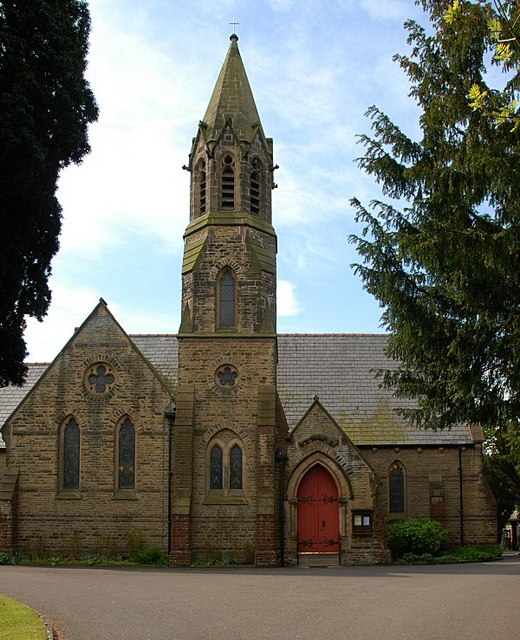
- United Reformed Church

- Shown within Fylde Borough Shown within the Fylde Location within Lancashire
- Population: 1,079 (2011 census)
- OS grid reference: SD421384
- Civil parish: Elswick
- District: Fylde
- Shire county: Lancashire
- Region: North West
- Country: England
- Sovereign state: United Kingdom
- Post town: PRESTON
- Postcode district: PR4
- Dialling code: 01995
- Police: Lancashire
- Fire: Lancashire
- Ambulance: North West
- UK Parliament: Fylde

Elswick is a rural village and civil parish on the Fylde peninsula of Lancashire, England. Population estimates for 2024 were 1,151.

At the Norman Conquest of England in 1066, Elswick was a small agricultural community in the hundred of Amounderness. The village was originally part of the ecclesiastical parish of St Michael's on Wyre. A Nonconformist chapel was built in Elswick before 1650.

Elswick is part of the local government district of Fylde and the parliamentary constituency of Fylde. It lies approximately 8.5 miles (14 km) east of Blackpool and 12 miles (19 km) north-west of Preston.

== History ==
Elswick was listed in the Domesday Book of 1086 as Edeleswic. In later documents it was recorded variously as Etleswhic, Etheliswyck and Elleswyk. At the time of the Norman Conquest of England in 1066, the township of Elswick—as part of the ancient hundred of Amounderness—was in the possession of Earl Tostig, the brother of King Harold II. Tostig died at the Battle of Stamford Bridge and his lands were subsequently taken over by the Normans. Between 1069 and 1086 William the Conqueror gave Amounderness to Anglo-Norman baron Roger the Poitevin. In the Domesday Book, the area of Elswick was estimated at three carucates of land.

In the 13th century, part of the township of Elswick was owned by the lord of Freckleton, and smaller parts by Warine de Whittingham and Alan de Singleton. In the early 16th century, Henry VII's administrator Edmund Dudley held the township and it was later in the possession of Thomas Stanley, 2nd Earl of Derby.

Elswick was part of the Ecclesiastical parish of St Michael's on Wyre and Elswick's villagers would have worshipped at St Michael's Church, approximately 5 miles (8 km) away. By 1650 a chapel had been built in the village which at that point was recorded as containing 50 families. It was intended to be a chapel of ease to St Michael's but was neither endowed nor consecrated, possibly because of the turmoil of the English Civil War. The chapel was licensed in 1671 for use as a Nonconformists' meeting place and used initially by Presbyterian worshippers. When this licence was made illegal, the chapel closed and later reopened as a Congregational chapel. In 1753, it was replaced by a new building, which was enlarged in 1838. This in turn was replaced by a chapel built 1873–74 by H. J. Powell, on land given by a Miss Harrison.

In 1902, a sanatorium for smallpox sufferers was built in the village. It was later a treatment centre for tuberculosis patients and then a probation hostel. It is now a private residence.

Between 1951 and 1956 just off the Roseacre Road between Elswick and Roseacre was the site of a VHF fixer station, part of the RAF Western Sector, and was one of a number similar fixed sites managed by nearby RAF Longley Lane. The site contained an octagonal wooden hut with a hand steerable radio mast with two radio receivers of type R1392D,[5] transmitter and telephone line. This hut was protected by a close surrounding octagonal brick wall to provide some bomb blast protection. The station was used to allow each sector to locate RAF or allied aircraft and to help pilots find airfield runways in low cloud weather conditions. The site had three RAF wireless personnel (two were normally on duty) who were billeted in Elswick village. The site closed in around 1956 as the technology was replaced by improved systems.

== Governance ==
Elswick is governed locally by a parish council, which is made up of seven elected councillors. Elswick, with the parish of Little Eccleston-with-Larbreck, forms the ward of Elswick and Little Eccleston, which elects one councillor. The population of this ward at the 2011 Census was 1,479. In 2011 the ward was represented by Paul Hayhurst, a non-aligned councillor.

The village is represented in the House of Commons of the Parliament of the United Kingdom as part of the constituency of Fylde. It elects one Member of Parliament (MP) by the first past the post system of election.

== Geography ==
At 53°50′20″N 2°52′50″W (53.839°, −2.880°), and approximately 240 miles (390 km) north-west of London, Elswick lies on a coastal plain called the Fylde. It is approximately 8.5 miles (14 km) east of the seaside resort of Blackpool, approximately 7 miles (11 km) south-east of Poulton-le-Fylde and about 12 miles (19 km) north-west of its post town, Preston. Nearby villages include Great Eccleston, St Michael's on Wyre and Thistleton.

Elswick has a generally temperate maritime climate like much of the British Isles, with cool summers and mild winters. In nearby Blackpool, there is an annual average rainfall of 871.3 millimetres (34.30 in).

Climate data for Blackpool (1971–2000 averages)
Month	Jan	Feb	Mar	Apr	May	Jun	Jul	Aug	Sep	Oct	Nov	Dec	Year
Mean daily maximum °C (°F)	6.8 (44.2)	7.1 (44.8)	9.1 (48.4)	11.6 (52.9)	15.2 (59.4)	17.3 (63.1)	19.4 (66.9)	19.4 (66.9)	17.0 (62.6)	13.7 (56.7)	9.8 (49.6)	7.6 (45.7)	12.9 (55.2)
Mean daily minimum °C (°F)	1.7 (35.1)	1.6 (34.9)	3.1 (37.6)	4.2 (39.6)	6.9 (44.4)	10.0 (50.0)	12.4 (54.3)	12.3 (54.1)	10.2 (50.4)	7.3 (45.1)	4.3 (39.7)	2.5 (36.5)	6.4 (43.5)
Average rainfall mm (inches)	81.1 (3.19)	58.7 (2.31)	68.3 (2.69)	48.9 (1.93)	49.0 (1.93)	59.8 (2.35)	59.5 (2.34)	73.4 (2.89)	82.5 (3.25)	97.9 (3.85)	94.0 (3.70)	58.3 (2.30)	871.3 (34.30)
Source: Met Office

== Demography ==
At the 2001 UK census, the civil parish of Elswick had a population of 1,057. The 2001 population density for the ward of Elswick and Little Eccleston was 1.61 per hectare, with a 100 to 96.8 female-to-male ratio. The proportion of residents who classified themselves as White was 99.5%, a figure higher than those for Fylde (98.6%), the North West (94.4%) and England (90.9%).

Elswick and Little Eccleston's 573 households included 21.5% one-person, 52.7% married couples living together (with or without children), 6.5% co-habiting couples, and 4.9% single parents with their children.

=== Population change ===
Population growth in Elswick since 1801
Year	1801	1811	1821	1831	1841	1851	1861	1871	1881	1891	1901	1911	1921	1931	1941	1951	1961	1971	1981	1991	2001
Population	232	256	290	327	303	307	290	254	242	223	227	230	374	417	—	457	465				1,057

== Economy ==
Elswick and Little Eccleston Ward compared
2001 UK census	Elswick and Little Eccleston	North West	England
Population of working age	1,070	4,839,669	35,532,091
Full-time employment	38.5%	38.8%	40.8%
Part-time employment	12.7%	11.9%	11.8%
Self-employed	15.4%	7.1%	8.3%
Unemployed	2.1%	3.6%	3.4%
Retired	14.4%	14.1%	13.5%

Historically, Elswick has largely been a rural agricultural community. In the 11th century it had the largest amount of cultivated land in the parish of St Michael. There was also a cottage weaving industry in the village up to the 19th century with villagers weaving flax and then cotton on hand looms. In the 21st century, Elswick is a dormitory village and many residents commute to Preston, Blackpool and Poulton-le-Fylde. The average distance travelled to work for the ward of Elswick and Little Eccleston is approximately 12.4 miles (20.0 km).

In 2001, compared to the rest of the Fylde borough, Elswick had a low proportion of unemployed people, and a low proportion of people in NRS social grade "E" (those at the lowest levels of subsistence). The percentage of unemployed people in the Elswick and Little Eccleston ward was lower than the averages for North West England and England as a whole, although slightly higher than the average for Fylde. There is a higher percentage of self-employed workers in Elswick and Little Eccleston than in Fylde, North West England and England as a whole.

== Landmarks ==
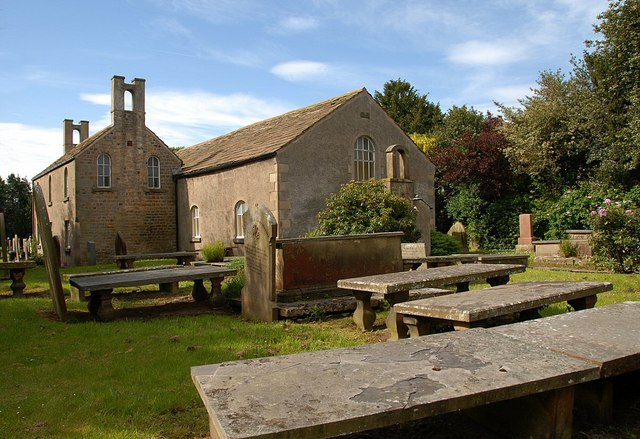
Old chapel, built 1753

The Congregational chapel of 1753 is now used as a church hall. It is a roughcast building on a rectangular plan with a two-storey house attached. The old chapel has been designated a Grade II listed building by English Heritage. The newer chapel, completed in 1874, is in the style of a traditional parish church with a tower. It is now a United Reformed church.

Elswick Manor is an early 19th-century house. It is rendered and has slate roofs. It has also received a Grade II designation. Hartwell and Pevsner (2009) describe the building as "nothing special". Other listed buildings in Elswick include the lodge to the manor house and farm buildings.

The village has two pubs—the Ship Inn and the Boot and Shoe. The village is known locally for its ice cream parlour, Bonds of Elswick.

== Transport ==
The railway came to the Fylde in 1840. There is no route through Elswick; the nearest railway stations to the village are Poulton-le-Fylde and Kirkham and Wesham, both on the line between Blackpool and Preston. Elswick lies west of the M6 motorway and is linked to it by the M55 motorway approximately 4 miles (6.4 km) away at Greenhalgh and by the B5269 road via Broughton.

Elswick's nearest international airport—approximately 6.5 miles (10.5 km) away—was Blackpool International Airport which had an annual capacity of 350,000 passengers. This airport has been closed for commercial use. The North West region is also served by the larger Liverpool John Lennon Airport and Manchester Airport.

The village has 2 bus routes serving it, both run by Archway Travel. The 74 to Preston and Fleetwood. The second route is the 78 to either Great Eccleston or Lytham St Annes.

== See also ==
- Listed buildings in Elswick, Lancashire
- List of civil parishes in Lancashire
