= Abbeystead disaster =

1984 explosion in Lancashire, England

Coordinates: 53.9788°N 2.6804°W

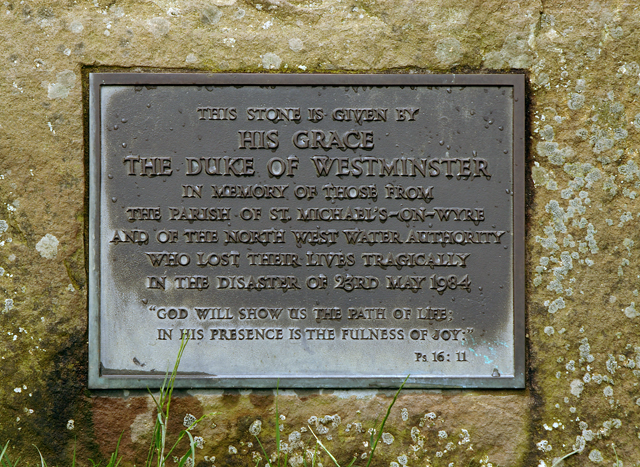
Plaque commemorating those who died in the explosion, situated outside the Valve house

The Abbeystead disaster occurred on the evening of 23 May 1984 when a methane gas explosion destroyed a waterworks' valve house at Abbeystead, Lancashire, England, killing 16 people. A group of 44 visitors were inside the underground building at the time, attending a public presentation by North West Water Authority (NWWA) to demonstrate the operations of the station. Eight were killed instantly by the explosion, and the others were severely injured. The explosion also caused the concrete roof to fall down onto the group, destroying the steel-mesh floor and throwing some of the victims into the water chambers below, which rapidly filled with river water. Another eight people subsequently died of their injuries in hospital. The official inquiry into the disaster concluded that the methane had seeped from coal deposits 4,000 feet (1,200 m) below ground and had built up in an empty pipeline. The gas was then ejected into the valve house by the sudden pressure of water as the pumps were switched on. The cause of ignition has never been determined.

== Background ==
The Abbeystead valve house was constructed as part of NWWA's 'Lancashire conjunctive use scheme', a water-supply project "to help in meeting the region's expected increases in water demand during the 1980s." The scheme involved the daily extraction of up to 62 million imperial gallons (280,000 m^{3}) of water from the River Lune near Lancaster, which was then pumped through Abbeystead into the River Wyre. From here it would be extracted to a treatment works to augment the drinking water supply for south Lancashire.

== Explosion ==
The visitors were from the village of St. Michael's on Wyre, approximately 10 miles (16 km) away, which had previously suffered flooding that residents believed was caused by the station pumping water from the River Lune to the River Wyre. The tour of the valve house had been arranged by NWWA to alleviate public concern about the flooding. George Mann, chairman of NWWA, said that the tour was intended to have a "family flavour". The tour began at 7:20 pm and the explosion occurred approximately 10 minutes later, with the first telephone call to the emergency services logged at 7:37 pm. Oliver Chippendale, the supervisor of a pumping station on the River Lune, had received a telephone call from George Lacey, the NWWA district manager conducting the tour, asking him to start pumping, and a second call five minutes later saying that no water was coming through and to activate a second, larger, pump. Twenty minutes later Chippendale called Abbeystead to check water was coming through and the telephone was answered by water engineer John Nelson who shouted "Get help! There has been a terrible disaster!" The force of the blast had lifted 30 concrete roof beams, each weighing 2½ tons, upwards through the soil landscaping above them before they fell into the chamber below.

Independent geological and seismic surveys commissioned by NWWA later identified the source of the methane gas as coal seams 4,000 feet (1,200 m) below the pipeline. The gas had collected over millions of years in a natural limestone reservoir, from which it seeped towards the surface through a complex network of geological faults. The cutting of the tunnel had intersected these faults and allowed the gas to seep in through its concrete lining.

== Inquest ==
An inquest into the deaths was held at Lancaster in October 1984. The jury returned a majority verdict of accidental death on all 16 victims.

The Health and Safety Executive investigated this incident and produced a special report in accordance with the Health and Safety at Work etc. Act 1974.

== Liability ==
In March 1987, at Lancaster High Court, the building's designers Binnie & Partners were found to be 55% liable in negligence for failing to exercise "reasonable care" in assessing the risk of methane. NWWA was found to be 30% to blame for failing to ensure the plant was safe for visitors and employees by testing for methane and Edmund Nuttall Ltd, who constructed the works, were found 15% liable for failing to carry out systematic tests for methane. All three appealed, and ultimately Binnie & Partners were found solely liable. Leave to appeal to the House of Lords was refused. In February 1989 most of the injured survivors and relatives of those who died accepted out-of-court settlements from Binnie & Partners.

== See also ==
- Firedamp
