= St Michael's on Wyre =

Village in Lancashire, England

Coordinates: 53.866°N 2.818°W

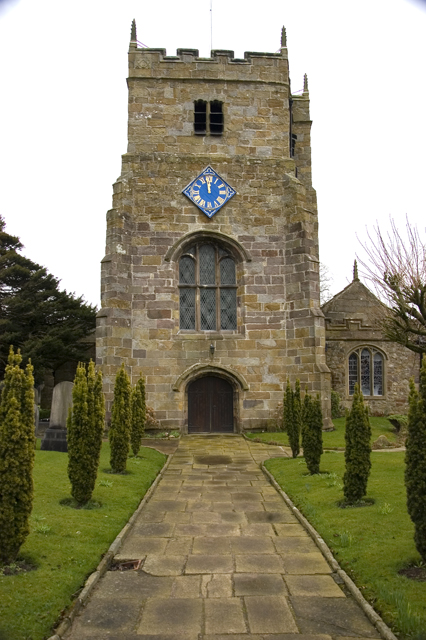
- St Michael's Church, St Michael's on Wyre

- Shown within Wyre Borough Shown on the Fylde Location within Lancashire
- OS grid reference: SD462414
- Civil parish: Upper Rawcliffe with Tarnacre
- District: Wyre
- Shire county: Lancashire
- Region: North West
- Country: England
- Sovereign state: United Kingdom
- Post town: PRESTON
- Postcode district: PR3
- Dialling code: 01995
- Police: Lancashire
- Fire: Lancashire
- Ambulance: North West
- UK Parliament: Lancaster and Wyre

St Michael's on Wyre is a village on the Fylde, in the Borough of Wyre, in Lancashire, England; it lies on the River Wyre. The village is centred on the church of St Michael, which was founded before 640 AD. It is in the civil parish of Upper Rawcliffe with Tarnacre, which had a population in 2001 of 604. (Note: For later counts see the civil parish)

== Location ==
St Michael's on Wyre is situated on The Fylde, between Lancaster, Preston and Blackpool.

== History ==
In 1835 the parish of St Michael's contained the townships of Out Rawcliffe, Upper Rawcliffe, Elswick, Great Eccleston, Inskip-with-Sowerby, Newsham and Woodplumpton.

In 1984, 16 people were killed by a gas explosion in the Abbeystead disaster, during a visit by a party from St Michael's to a waterworks 10 miles (16 kilometres) up the River Wyre.

Following severe flooding in 2015 which resulted in the evacuation of the villagers, Prince Harry visited the village to meet with residents affected and reopen the refurbished village hall.

== Today ==
The small village has its own pub, car garage, school, village hall (with a post office), tennis club, bowling club and nearby Myerscough College. The parish church of St Michael is the village's most prominent landmark. The nave and chancel date from the 14th century, and the tower from the 16th. It is one of two Grade I listed buildings in the Borough of Wyre.

=== Death of Nicola Bulley ===
On 19 February 2023, the body of 45-year-old Nicola Bulley was found in the Wyre about one mile (1.5 kilometres) downstream of the village, where she had disappeared while walking her dog on 27 January. An inquest into her death determined that she had accidentally drowned. Lancashire Constabulary were criticised for their handling of the case, including releasing private details of Bulley's health, and users of social media were criticised for travelling to the area during the search and were described as "[playing] private detectives".

== Transport ==
=== Bus ===
The village has 1 bus route serving it run by Stagecoach in Lancaster. Service 42 to either Blackpool or Lancaster. As of March 2026 this service runs hourly.

=== Air ===
St Michael's microlight airfield is about one mile (1.5 kilometres) southeast of the village, south of St Michael's Road. It has three grass runways, and its airport code is GB-0398. It is the home of Northern Microlight School, founded in 1982. Queen Elizabeth II visited the airfield in May 2015.

== See also ==
- Listed buildings in Upper Rawcliffe-with-Tarnacre
