= Listed buildings in Elswick, Lancashire =

Elswick is a civil parish in the Borough of Fylde, Lancashire, England. It contains eight buildings that are recorded in the National Heritage List for England as designated listed buildings, all of which are listed at Grade II. This grade is the lowest of the three gradings given to listed buildings and is applied to "buildings of national importance and special interest". Apart from the village of Elswick, the parish is rural. The listed buildings consist of two farmhouses and a farm building, a chapel and an associated gravestone, and a former manor house with two associated buildings.

== Buildings ==
Name and location	Photograph	Date	Notes
Forest Farmhouse; 53.83893°N 2.88190°W	—	17th century or earlier (probable)	The farmhouse was remodelled in the 18th century. It is in brick with a rendered front, in two storeys and with three bays. The windows are three-light casements. On the right gabled side are two cruck blades.
Barn, Chapel Farm; 53.83976°N 2.88086°W	—	17th century (probable)	The remains of a cruck-framed barn, the two full cruck trusses having been damaged by fire. The walls are in cobble, cob, and brick. It is a small building, with three bays.
Elswick Lodge Farmhouse; 53.83881°N 2.85890°W		Early 18th century (probable)	A stuccoed farmhouse in cobble and brick, with a slate roof. It has two storeys, and originally had three bays, with extensions to the right and to the rear. The windows have segmental heads.
Old Congregational Chapel; 53.83776°N 2.87754°W		1753	The former Congregational chapel has been used later as a meeting room, and is attached to a house at the southeast. It is in stone with a slate roof, and is a small rectangular building. The entrance front is gabled and contains a gabled porch above which is a stone arch and a round-headed window. There are similar windows along the sides of the chapel, and a circular window at the rear. The house has two storeys and three bays, with round headed windows, and pairs of chimney flues linked by arches.
Gravestone, Old Congregational Chapel; 53.83786°N 2.87754°W	—	1759	The gravestone of a former minister of the church. It consists of rectangular slab with roll-moulded edges carrying an inscription.
Stable house, Elswick Manor; 53.84027°N 2.86213°W	—	1819	The stable house, later used as a dwelling, is in brick with a slate roof in Gothic style. The wall at the east end is curved, and has an embattled parapet, there is an embattled tower at the west end, along the south side are arched windows with Y-tracery, and on the north side are wagon entrances.
Elswick Manor; 53.83994°N 2.86034°W	—	Early 19th century	A large house later used as a convent, it is stuccoed and has a slate roof. There are two storeys, and extensions to the right and at the rear. The doorway has a semicircular fanlight, and the windows are sashes. At the far right is a single-storey chapel.
Lodge, Elswick Manor; 53.84041°N 2.85861°W	—	Early 19th century	The lodge is roughcast and has a slate roof. There are two low storeys, and the lodge has a square plan. Facing the drive to the house is a full-height semicircular bay with a conical roof.
