= Inskip (surname) =

Inskip is an English surname, originally given to people from Inskip, Lancashire. Notable people with the surname include:

- James Inskip (1868–1949), English Anglican bishop
- John Swanel Inskip (1816–1884), American minister
- Peter Inskip, Australian rugby league footballer
- Thomas Inskip (1876–1947), British politician
- Tim Inskip (1885–1971), British Indian Army major-general and cricketer
- William Inskip (1852–1899), English trade unionist
