= Out Rawcliffe =

Village in Lancashire, England

Coordinates: 53.868°N 2.907°W

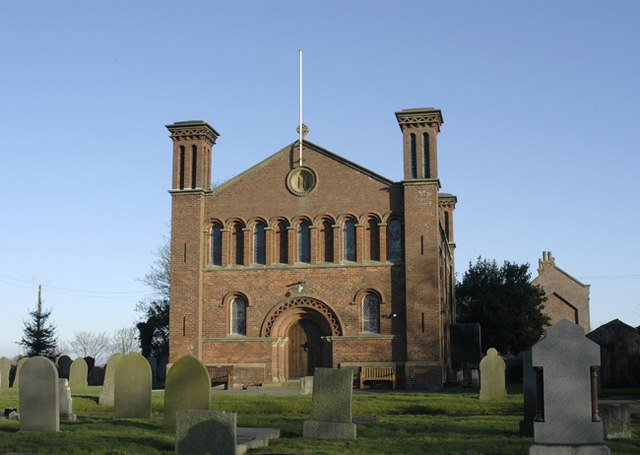
- St John's Church, Out Rawcliffe

- Shown within Wyre Borough Shown on the Fylde Location within Lancashire
- Population: 626 (2011 census)
- OS grid reference: SD403417
- Civil parish: Out Rawcliffe
- District: Wyre
- Shire county: Lancashire
- Region: North West
- Country: England
- Sovereign state: United Kingdom
- Post town: PRESTON
- Postcode district: PR3
- Dialling code: 01253
- Police: Lancashire
- Fire: Lancashire
- Ambulance: North West
- UK Parliament: Lancaster and Wyre

Out Rawcliffe is a village and civil parish on the north bank of the River Wyre in the Over Wyre area of the Fylde in Lancashire, England. The population of the civil parish taken at the 2011 census was 626.

It is the location of the medieval Rawcliffe Hall. The hall is still being used today as a bar and function room at Rawcliffe Hall Holiday Park. The village has one Anglican church, Out Rawcliffe St John Church, built in 1838 in the Romanesque style by John Deerhurst, the year after he had designed Preston Prison.

The village also had one school, Out Rawcliffe Church of England Primary School, which was closed down due to lack of pupil entrants, as well as a village hall that stages a monthly quiz night.

Out Rawcliffe was once a township in the ancient parish of St Michael's on Wyre. This became a civil parish in 1866, forming part of the Garstang Rural District from 1894 till 1974. It has since become part of the Borough of Wyre.

Along with Great Eccleston, Inskip-with-Sowerby and Upper Rawcliffe-with-Tarnacre and Kirkland, Out Rawcliffe forms part of the Great Eccleston ward of Wyre Borough Council.

== See also ==
- Listed buildings in Out Rawcliffe
