= Albert George Long =

British educator and paleobotanist

Dr Albert George Long FRSE LLD (1915–1999) was a British educator and palaeobotanist. He was an expert on the Lower Carboniferous period. He was creator of the Cupule-Carpel Theory.

== Life ==
He was born in Inskip, Lancashire. on 28 January 1915. the son of Rev Albert James Long (died 1940), a Baptist minister, and his wife, Isabel Amblet (died 1960). He attended school in Todmorden. As a schoolboy he was shot in the left foot and relied on a medical boot to walk, walking with a permanent limp. He then studied science at Manchester University under Professor William Henry Lang. He then underwent training as a teacher and, initially, took a post at Lewes in Sussex.

In 1945, he began teaching science at Berwickshire High School in Duns in the Scottish Borders. In 1962, he was elected a fellow of the Royal Society of Edinburgh. His proposers were Charles Waterston, John Walton, Alexander Mackie and Claude Wardlaw. Unusually, he won the society's Makdougall-Brisbane Prize for the period 1958 to 1960, before being made a fellow. In 1966, he was awarded an honorary doctorate (DSc) from his alma mater and, in 1967, a second honorary doctorate (LLD) from Glasgow University.

In 1966, he left Duns to become deputy curator of the Hancock Museum in Newcastle-upon-Tyne.

He died at home in Tweedmouth on 13 March 1999.

== Publications ==
- Hitherto (1996) (autobiography)

== Family ==
He married Gladys Hunt in 1942. They had two children, Jean and David.
