= Listed buildings in Inskip-with-Sowerby =

Inskip-with-Sowerby is a civil parish in the Wyre district of Lancashire, England. It contains six listed buildings that are recorded in the National Heritage List for England. All the listed buildings are designated at Grade II, the lowest of the three grades, which is applied to "buildings of national importance and special interest". The parish includes the village of Inskip and surrounding countryside. The listed buildings are two houses, two farmhouses, a former workshop, and a church.

== Buildings ==
Name and location	Photograph	Date	Notes
Sowerby Hall; 53.84000°N 2.79960°W	—	Early 17th century	A pebbledashed brick house with a slate roof in two storeys with attics. It has a one-bay main range with a left cross wing, a two-storey gabled porch to the right, and to the right of this is a single-storey outshut. The doorway and windows have plain reveals, the windows being sashes. The window in the upper floor of the porch has a segmental head. Inside the house is a bressumer.
Mill House; 53.83313°N 2.81619°W	—	c. 1700	A rendered house with a thatched roof in two storeys and with three bays. The doorway and windows have plain reveals, and the windows are horizontal sliding sashes. There is a narrow outshut at the rear.
Whitehouse Farmhouse; 53.83558°N 2.82839°W	—	c. 1700	The house is pebbledashed with a slate roof, in two storeys and with three bays. On the front is a single-storey gabled porch with a round-headed doorway. The windows have plain reveals, and some are horizontal sliding sashes. Inside the house is a bressumer.
Porters Farmhouse and Carr Cottage; 53.82859°N 2.80661°W	—	Early 18th century (probable)	A house and cottage in rendered brick with a roof partly of slate and partly of corrugated iron. It has two storeys and five bays. On the front are single-storey gabled porches, and the windows are modern with plain reveals.
Outbuilding, Brook House; 53.82513°N 2.79826°W	—	18th century (possible)	Originally a wheelwright's shop, later used for other purposes, it has wall of brick, mud and turf, and a roof of corrugated iron over thatch. It is in a single storey, the windows have timber lintels, and there are various other openings. Inside are parts of cruck trusses.
St Peter's Church; 53.83486°N 2.81748°W		1848	The chancel and steeple were added in 1925. The older part of the church is in limestone with sandstone dressings and a slate roof, and the additions are mainly in sandstone. The church consists of a nave, a south porch, a chancel, and a north transept with a steeple to its west. On the west gable is a bellcote with a cross finial, and below it is a wheel window. The steeple has a three-stage tower and a broach spire with lucarnes. The windows in the older part are mainly lancets, in the sides of the chancel they have two lights, and the east window has stepped lancets.
