= Great Eccleston =

Village in Lancashire, England

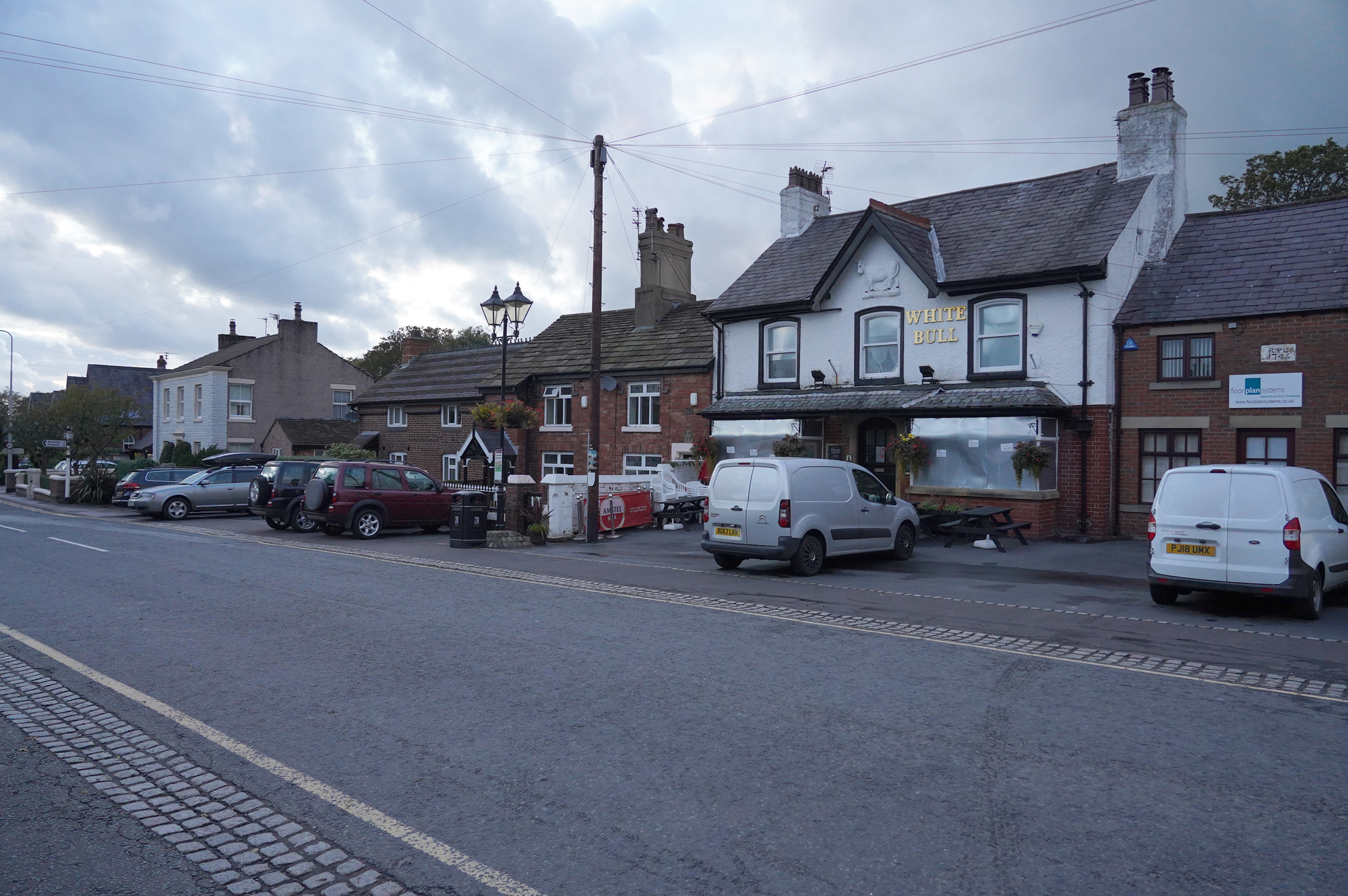
- High Street, Great Eccleston (2009)

- Shown within Wyre Borough Shown on the Fylde Location within Lancashire
- Population: 1,773 (2021)
- OS grid reference: SD428402
- Civil parish: Great Eccleston
- District: Wyre
- Shire county: Lancashire
- Region: North West
- Country: England
- Sovereign state: United Kingdom
- Post town: PRESTON
- Postcode district: PR3
- Dialling code: 01995
- Police: Lancashire
- Fire: Lancashire
- Ambulance: North West
- UK Parliament: Lancaster and Wyre

Great Eccleston is a village and civil parish in Lancashire, England. The village, part of the Fylde coast plain, lies to the south of the River Wyre and the A586 road, approximately 10 miles (16 km) upstream from Fleetwood. At the 2001 census, the parish had a population of 1,473, rising slightly to 1,486 at the 2011 census. It increased again in 2021 Census to 1,773.

Great Eccleston is part of Wyre district. Locally, the village is known for its annual agricultural show.

== History ==
Great Eccleston was listed in the Domesday Book of 1086 as Eglestun. In various 13th-century documents it was recorded as Ecclisto, Ecleston and Great Eccleston. In 1066 when the Normans conquered England, the township of Great Eccleston—then part of the ancient hundred of Amounderness—was in the possession of Tostig Godwinson, the brother of King Harold II. Tostig died at the Battle of Stamford Bridge and his lands were subsequently taken over by the Normans. Between 1069 and 1086 William the Conqueror gave Amounderness to Roger de Poitou, an Anglo-Norman baron. In the Domesday Book, the area of Great Eccleston was estimated at two carucates (ploughlands) of land.

The township was originally part of the ecclesiastical parish of St Michael's on Wyre and Great Eccleston's parishioners would have worshipped there at St Michael's Church. In 1723, a chapel of ease to St Michael's was built in a part of Great Eccleston civil parish called Copp. It was dedicated to St Anne.

== Governance ==
Great Eccleston is governed locally by a parish council, which is made up of eight elected councillors. Great Eccleston, with the parishes of Inskip with Sowerby, Upper Rawcliffe with Tarnacre and Out Rawcliffe, forms the ward of Great Eccleston, which elects two councillors. The population of the ward at the 2011 Census was 3,581. Great Eccleston was formerly part of the rural district of Garstang. In 1974, the district merged with those of Fleetwood, Thornton-Cleveleys, Poulton-le-Fylde and Preesall to form Wyre Borough Council.

The village is represented in the House of Commons of the Parliament of the United Kingdom as part of Lancaster and Wyre. It elects one MP by the first past the post system of election.

== Geography ==
At 53°51′18″N 2°52′15.6″W (53.855°, −2.871°), Great Eccleston lies 10 miles (16 km) north-east of Blackpool, approximately 6 miles (10 km) south-east of Poulton-le-Fylde and about 12 miles (19 km) north-west of Preston. Nearby villages include Little Eccleston, Elswick, St Michael's on Wyre and Singleton.

The Fylde Coastal Plain is relatively flat and low–lying, predominantly below 30 m (100 feet) above sea–level, but there is a small knoll called Whitprick Hill roughly halfway between Weston on the B5260 and Wesham that rises to 45 m (148 feet) above sea–level.

== Transport ==
Great Eccleston is served mainly by Stagecoach Cumbria and North Lancashire service 42 between Lancaster Bus Station and Blackpool Abingdon St., hourly during the daytime during the hours 10.00 to 18.00 and every 90 minutes before 10.00, with an approximate three–hour morning gap Monday–Friday from 06.53 to 09.35, (no early morning service Saturday and Sunday) in the Blackpool–Lancaster direction, and support for a late–evening service providing three journeys at 90–minute intervals between 20.00 and 23.00 in each direction was recently re–introduced by Lancaster County Council, prior to this the service ended as early as 18.33 from Blackpool, necessitating either the use of trains and/or taxis from Poulton or Blackpool if you wanted to leave the resort later.

Hourly services are provided by Archway travel Service 74 between Preston Bus Station and Fleetwood as well as Service 78 between Great Eccleston and St. Annes, each of which runs between 07.00 and 19.00 Mondays–Saturdays with a few late evening journeys on Service 74 to Preston.

The nearest railway station is Poulton–le–Fylde on the 25 kV electrified Blackpool–Manchester route, approximately 4 miles (6.2 km) away.

== Climate ==
Great Eccleston has a generally temperate maritime climate like much of the British Isles, with cool summers and mild winters. In nearby Blackpool, there is an annual average rainfall of 871.3 millimetres (34.30 in).

Climate data for Blackpool (1971–2000 averages)
Month	Jan	Feb	Mar	Apr	May	Jun	Jul	Aug	Sep	Oct	Nov	Dec	Year
Mean daily maximum °C (°F)	6.8 (44.2)	7.1 (44.8)	9.1 (48.4)	11.6 (52.9)	15.2 (59.4)	17.3 (63.1)	19.4 (66.9)	19.4 (66.9)	17.0 (62.6)	13.7 (56.7)	9.8 (49.6)	7.6 (45.7)	12.9 (55.2)
Mean daily minimum °C (°F)	1.7 (35.1)	1.6 (34.9)	3.1 (37.6)	4.2 (39.6)	6.9 (44.4)	10.0 (50.0)	12.4 (54.3)	12.3 (54.1)	10.2 (50.4)	7.3 (45.1)	4.3 (39.7)	2.5 (36.5)	6.4 (43.5)
Average rainfall mm (inches)	81.1 (3.19)	58.7 (2.31)	68.3 (2.69)	48.9 (1.93)	49.0 (1.93)	59.8 (2.35)	59.5 (2.34)	73.4 (2.89)	82.5 (3.25)	97.9 (3.85)	94.0 (3.70)	58.3 (2.30)	871.3 (34.30)
Source: Met Office

== Culture and community ==
A farmers' market is held in Great Eccleston every month. A weekly general market takes place each week.

The Great Eccleston Agricultural Show is held in the village over two days every July along with Tractor Pulling, which also sees an event held in its own right at the same show ground during the August bank holiday. Horse, steam and agricultural shows have been held in Great Eccleston since the mid-19th century. Like many similar rural events, the Great Eccleston Show waned in popularity and ceased to take place in the 1950s; it was reinstated in 1972. Up to 40,000 people were expected to attend the 2011 show. Displays typically feature livestock, horticulture, country crafts, local produce and agricultural vehicles.

== See also ==
- Listed buildings in Great Eccleston
- List of civil parishes in Lancashire
