= Archway Travel =

Bus and coach operator in Lancashire, England

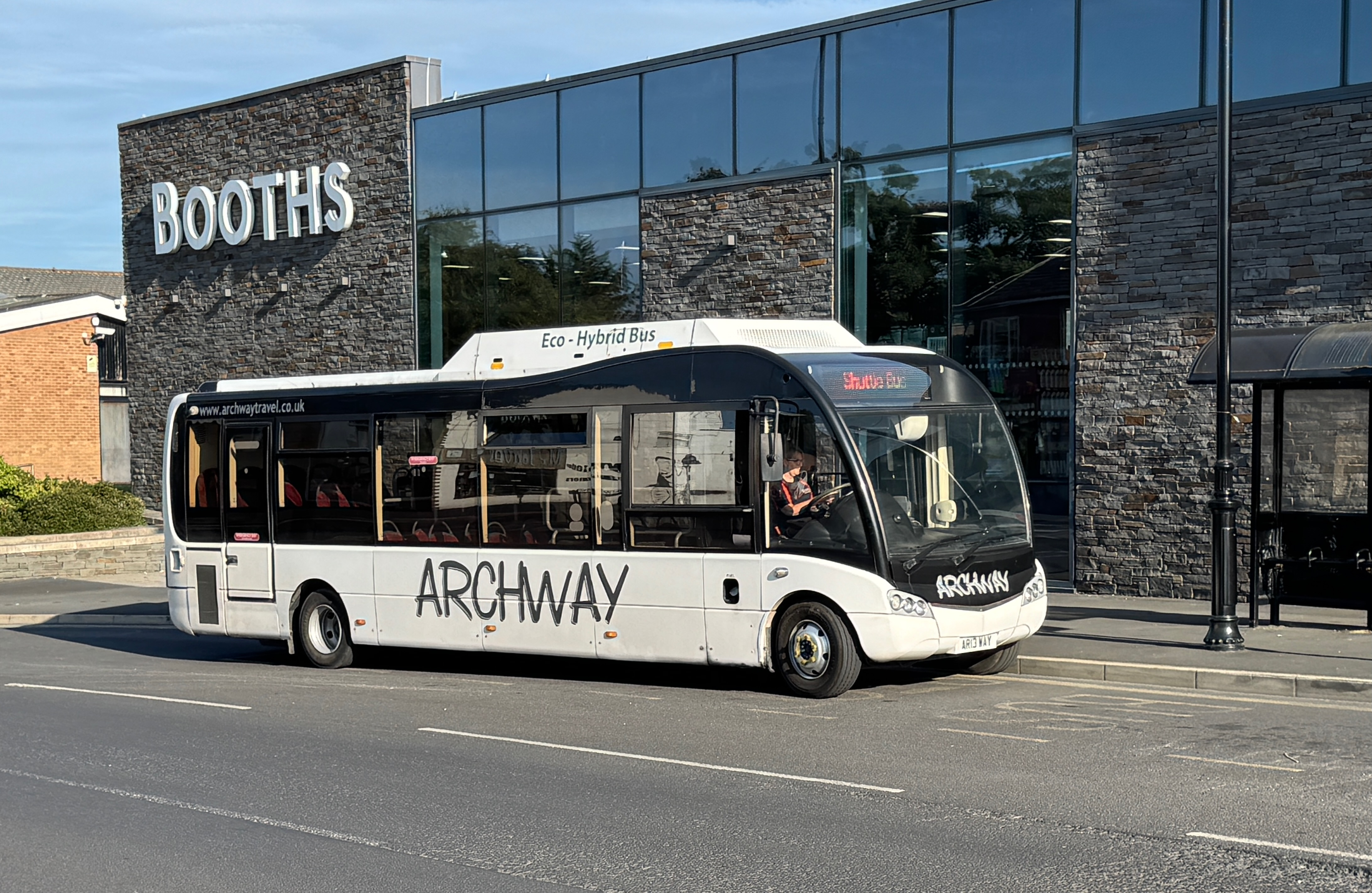
- Archway Travel Optare Solo SR in Poulton-le-Fylde in July 2024
- Founded: 1993 (33 years ago)
- Headquarters: Fleetwood, Lancashire, England
- Service type: Bus and coach
- Routes: 17
- Fleet: 25
- Managing director: Sam Archer
- Website: archwaytravel.co.uk

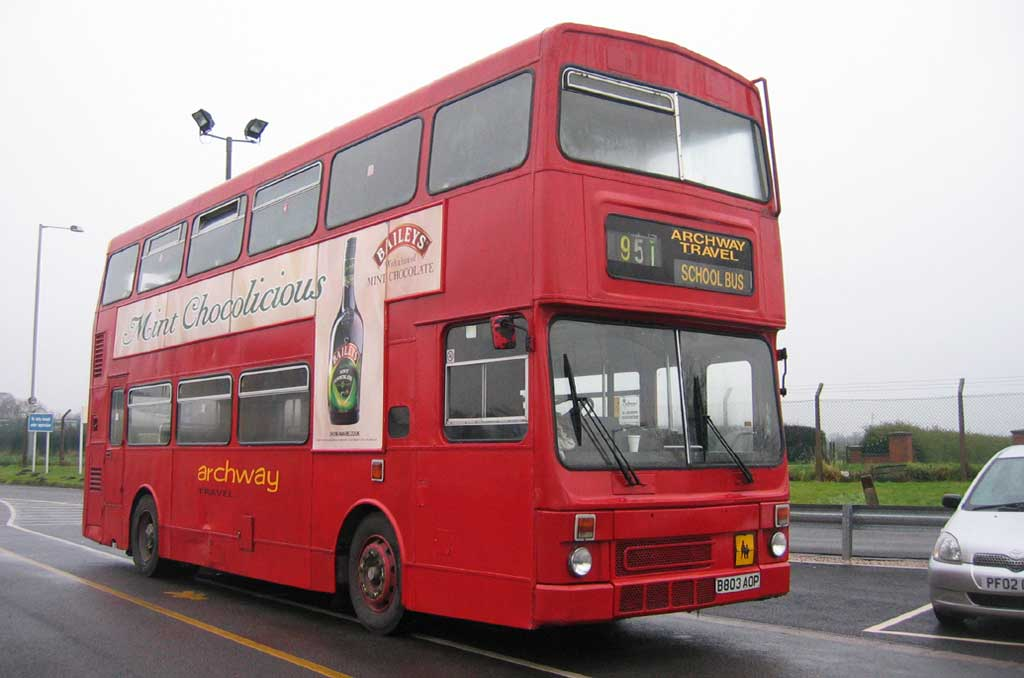
Archway Travel MCW Metrobus school bus in January 2009

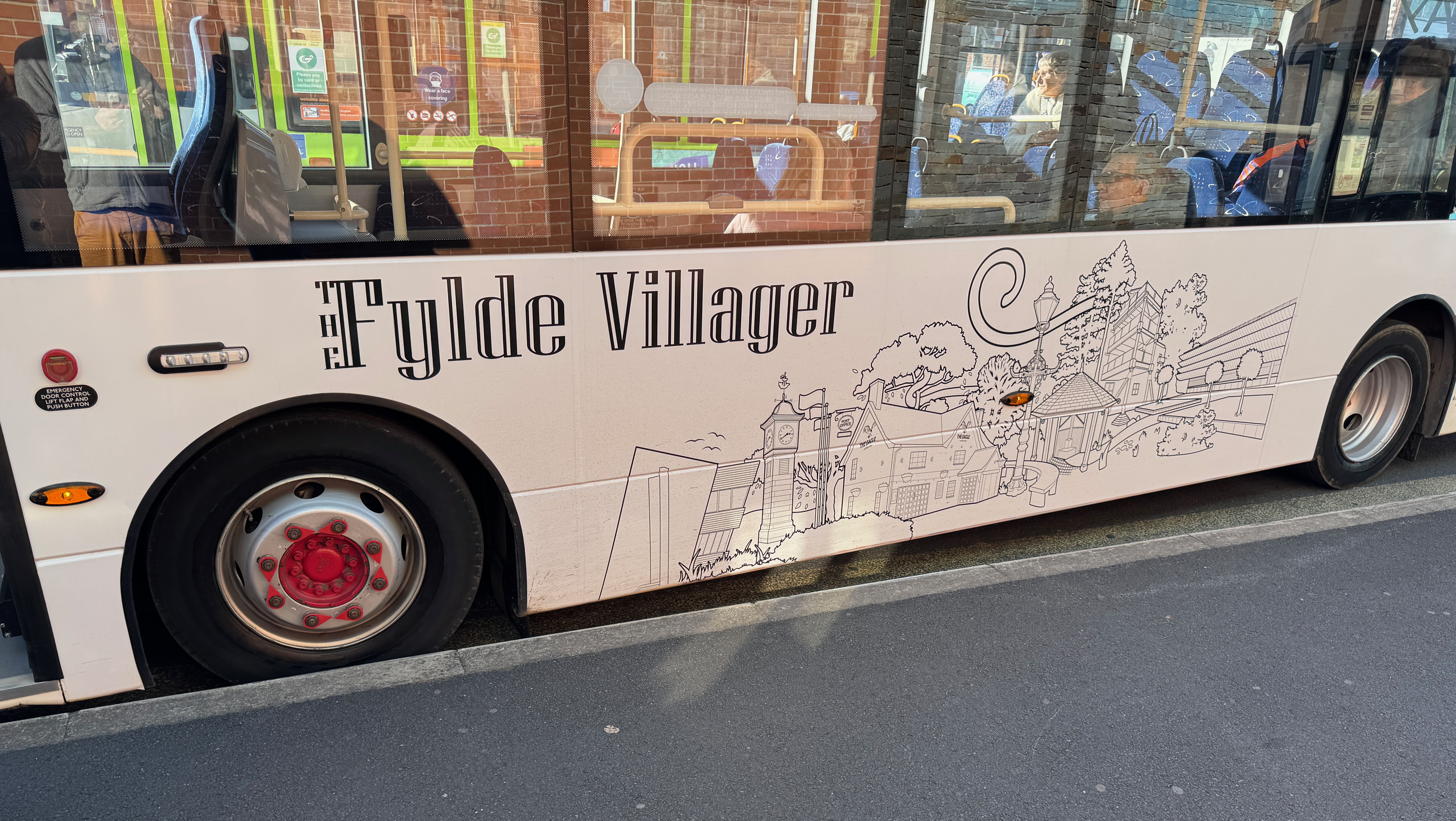
"Fylde Villager" livery

Archway Travel is a bus and coach operator based in Fleetwood, Lancashire, England. Their fleet of 25 vehicles range from 24- to 80-seater coaches and buses. The company's routes predominantly serve schools and colleges in Lancashire and public service routes.

As of 2023, the company's managing director is Sam Archer, part of the family of owners.

In August 2024, the company began a service contract with Lancashire County Council (LCC) to run routes 74 and 75, replacing a similar contract LCC had with Blackpool Transport since 2020. The same month, Archway hired nine new Alexander Dennis Enviro200 single-decker buses to assist with its continued venture into local service operation. They were given a "Fylde Villager" livery.

Archway Travel, which is headquartered on Copse Road in Fleetwood.

== Routes ==
Archway travel operate the following 17 routes:

Route	Origin and destination
74	Fleetwood to Preston via Thornton, Poulton-le-Fylde, Great Eccleston, Elswick, Inskip, Catforth and Lea
75	Fleetwood to Preston via Thornton, Cleveleys, Poulton-le-Fylde, Staining, Weeton, Kirkham and Newton with Scales
76	Blackpool to St Anne's via Poulton-le-Fylde, Weeton, Kirkham, Wrea Green, Warton & Lytham
78	Great Eccleston to St Anne's via Elswick, Kirkham, Freckleton, Warton, Lytham & Ansdell
509	Winmarleigh to Garstang Academy
567	Knott-end to Lancaster Grammar School
607	Thistleton to Baines High School via Elswick, Great Eccleston, Little Singleton, Singleton and Little Poulton
648	Fleetwood to Poulton Baines School
660	Cleveleys to Poulton Hodgson Academy
901/902	Fleetwood to Preesall
903/904	Cleveleys to Preesall
905	St Michael's to Preesall
906	Hampton Green to Preesall
SM1	Merside to St Mary's Catholic Academy
SM2	Blackpool South Railway Station to St Mary's Catholic Academy

== See also ==
- Public transport in the Fylde
