= William Hornby (priest) =

William Hornby (1810–1899) was the inaugural Archdeacon of Lancaster.

Hornby was educated at Christ Church, Oxford. He was Vicar of St Michael's on Wyre from 1847 to 1885; and Rural Dean of Preston from 1850 to 1878.

He died on 20 December 1899. His son was also Archdeacon of Lancaster from 1909 to 1936.

Church of England titles
Preceded by Inaugural appointment	Archdeacon of Lancaster; 1870–1895	Succeeded by Arthur Frederic Clarke
