= St Michael's Church, St Michael's on Wyre =

Coordinates: 53.8628°N 2.8195°W

St Michael's
- Church of Saint Michael
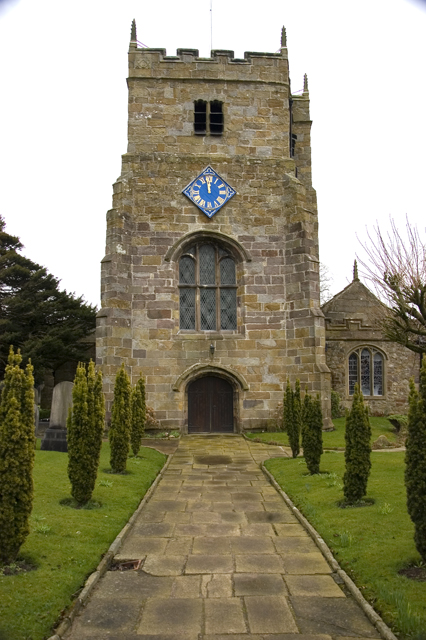
- St Michael's Church, from the west

- Location in the Borough of Wyre
- OS grid reference: SD 4620241041
- Location: St Michael's on Wyre, Lancashire
- Country: England
- Denomination: Anglican

History
- Status: Parish church

Architecture
- Functional status: Active
- Heritage designation: Grade I
- Designated: 17 April 1967

Administration
- Province: York
- Diocese: Blackburn
- Archdeaconry: Lancaster

St Michael's Church is an Anglican church in the village of St Michael's on Wyre, Lancashire, England. It is a typical late Medieval church and has been designated by English Heritage as a Grade I listed building. It is an active parish church in the Diocese of Blackburn and the archdeaconry of Lancaster.

== History ==
St Michael's on Wyre is one of seven ancient parishes of the hundred of Amounderness. It was the third largest, with an area of 18,888 acres (76.44 km^{2}; 29.51 sq mi). The Domesday Book of 1086 lists three churches in Amounderness, one of which was probably St Michael's. There has certainly been a church on the site from at least the 13th century, elements of which remain in the current building. The present church was possibly built in the 15th century and alterations were made in the 17th century. The church was designated a Grade I listed building on 17 April 1967. The Grade I listing is for buildings "exceptional interest, sometimes considered to be internationally important".

== Architecture ==
The church is typical of late Medieval churches of northern England and is constructed of sandstone ashlar and rubble. The plan consists of a tower at the west end, a chancel and nave under a continuous roof and a chapel to the north. The tower is said to date from 1549. It is broad and low with a west window and has three stages, the upper of which (added later) is inset. The date 1611 and the coat of arms and initials of Henry Butler are carved into the parapet. The tower's plan is trapezoidal and it has angled buttresses.

The chancel and nave are under a continuous roof of blue slate. There is an aisle to the south under a separate gabled slate roof, with an embattled parapet and buttresses. The aisle is separated from the chancel by two wide arches. There is a porch to the south of the south aisle. A shorter aisle lies to the north of the church, west of the Butler Chapel.

The Butler Chapel to the north of the church dates from 1480 and was founded as a chantry of St Katharine. It was repaired in 1797 and reseated and restored in 1854. It has a pitched roof with an embattled parapet which dates from the 19th century. Its windows have flat heads with cinquefoil tops and upper mouchettes.

The tower houses a ring of three bells, hung in a timber frame. The treble was cast in 1458 and given to the church by a French lady named Catherine de Bernieules, Lady of Neufchatel. It is inscribed with Gothic script. The second bell was cast in 1663 by Geoffrey Scott of Wigan. The third dates from 1742 and was cast by Abel Rudhall of Gloucestershire.

== See also ==
- Grade I listed buildings in Lancashire
- Listed buildings in Upper Rawcliffe-with-Tarnacre
