= Garstang Rural District =

Historical rural district in Lancashire

Coordinates: 53.90283°N 2.77331°W

- Rural district
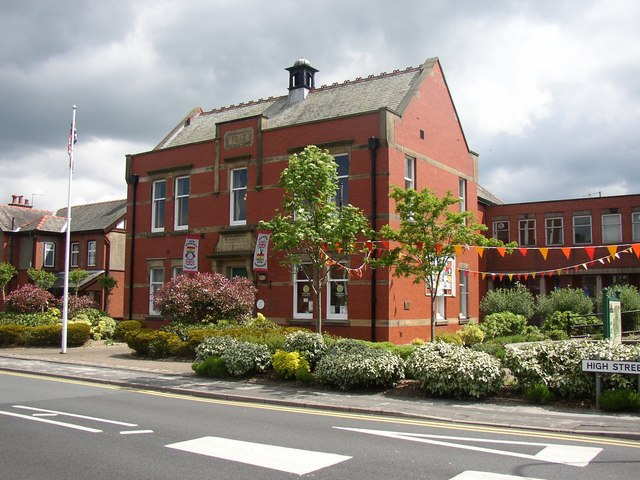
- Council Offices, 96 High Street, Garstang: Council's headquarters 1913–1974
- Population
  - 1901: 10,437
  - 1971: 18,045
- History
  - Created: 28 December 1894
  - Abolished: 31 March 1974
  - Succeeded by: Wyre
  - HQ: Garstang
- Contained within
  - County Council: Lancashire

Garstang Rural District was a rural district in the county of Lancashire, England from 1894 to 1974.

== Origins ==
The district had its origins in the Garstang Poor Law Union, which had been created in 1837, covering Garstang itself and several surrounding parishes. In 1872 sanitary districts were established, giving public health and local government responsibilities to the existing boards of guardians for the rural parts of their poor law unions that were not already covered by an urban authority. As there were no urban authorities within the Garstang Poor Law Union, the Garstang Rural Sanitary District covered the same area.

Under the Local Government Act 1894, rural sanitary districts became rural districts from 28 December 1894.

== Premises ==
In its early years the council met at Garstang Town Hall. In 1913 the council built itself new Council Offices at 52 High Street (later renumbered 96 High Street) at a cost of £2,806. The building was formally opened on 18 December 1913 and served as the council's headquarters until the district's abolition in 1974.

== Abolition ==
Garstang Rural District was abolished under the Local Government Act 1972, with the area becoming part of the new Borough of Wyre on 1 April 1974. The council's former offices in Garstang subsequently became a community centre.
