= The Fylde =

Coastal plain in western Lancashire, England

Coordinates: 53.837°N 2.861°W

Towns and villages on the Fylde

The Fylde (/ˈfaɪld/) is a coastal plain in western Lancashire, England. It is roughly a 13-mile-long (21-kilometre) square-shaped peninsula, bounded by Morecambe Bay to the north, the Ribble estuary to the south, the Irish Sea to the west, and the foot of the Bowland hills to the east which approximates to a section of the M6 motorway and West Coast Main Line.

== Geography ==
It is a flat, alluvial plain, parts of which have deposits of and were once dug for peat. The River Wyre meanders across the Fylde from Garstang on the eastern edge, westwards towards Poulton and then northwards to the sea at Fleetwood. The area north and east of the tidal Wyre, known as Over Wyre, is the more rural side of the river. The Fylde is roughly trisected by the M55 motorway and A586 road.

The west coast is almost entirely urban, containing the towns of Fleetwood, Cleveleys, Blackpool, St Annes and Lytham; with Thornton, Carleton and Poulton-le-Fylde not far inland. This area forms the Blackpool Urban Area. The central southern part of the Fylde includes the smaller towns of Kirkham and Wesham. The rest of the Fylde is rural, containing villages that include Freckleton, Warton, Wrea Green, Great Eccleston, Hambleton, Knott End and Pilling.

== Geology ==
The Fylde is underlain by sedimentary bedrock of Triassic age though it is everywhere concealed by a thick cover of superficial deposits (exceeding 30 metres (98 ft) thickness in places) laid down during the present Quaternary period. The older rocks are the Sherwood Sandstones which "subcrop" in the east. The slightly younger mudstones and siltstones of the Mercia Mudstone Group are found west of a line drawn roughly between Freckleton, St Michael's on Wyre and Preesall. The group is subdivided into formations and members; one in particular is of note, the "Preesall Halite member", traditionally referred to as the Preesall Salt. It was the basis of former commercial operations in the area. Amongst others, boreholes sunk in connection with the former saltfield have provided much of the information on the bedrock of the area. The Mythop salt beds within the Mercia Mudstone succession are also conjectured to outcrop beneath the southwest corner of the Fylde.

The Quaternary cover consists of glacial till deriving from the last ice age (Devensian) together with some scattered glaciofluvial deposits, mainly sand and gravel. A small drumlin field is recognised between Preesall, Thornton and Hambleton. Of more recent origin are clays, silts, sands and gravels forming both modern river floodplains and river terraces, most of which are associated with the River Wyre and its tributaries. Also post-glacial in age are the clays and silts of the broad tidal flats around Fleetwood and the Morecambe Bay coast and the Ribble estuary. Large areas of blown sand forming dune systems characterise the coastal zone north and east of Lytham St Annes whilst a thinner strip follows the north coast east from Fleetwood. Peat deposits are common in the shallow north–south valley occupied by Main Dyke just east of Blackpool and also forming the mosses in the northeast of the area.

== Governance ==
The Borough of Fylde	FY postcode area

The Borough of Fylde is a local government area covering the south of the Fylde plain. The rest is covered by the boroughs of Wyre and Blackpool to the north and west respectively. The local justice area covering all of the Fylde is called Fylde Coast.

The FY postcode area, whose letters refer to the Fylde, covers its western half—the eastern half is in the PR postcode area. Historically, the Fylde formed the western part of the wapentake or hundred of Amounderness.

== Gallery ==
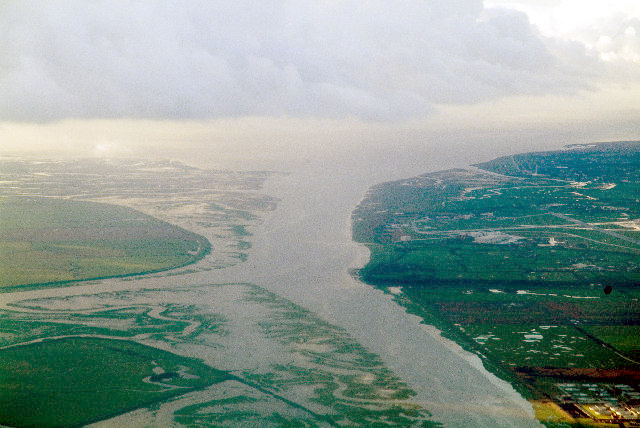
Ribble estuary, looking west, separating the West Lancashire Coastal Plain (left) from the Fylde (right)

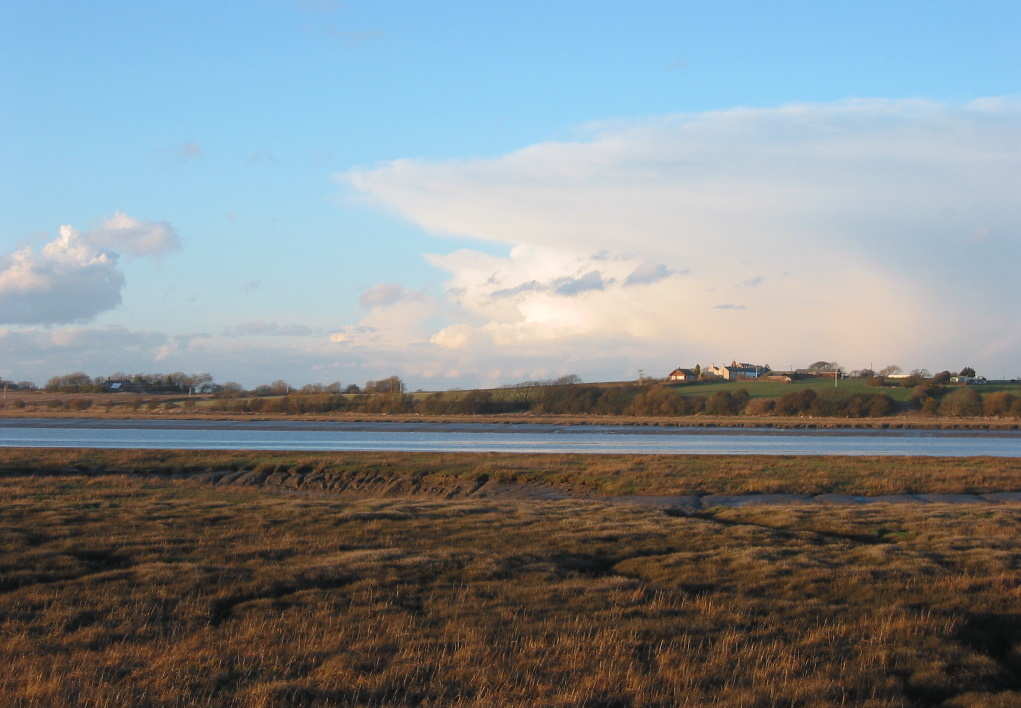
Countryside near the Wyre Estuary

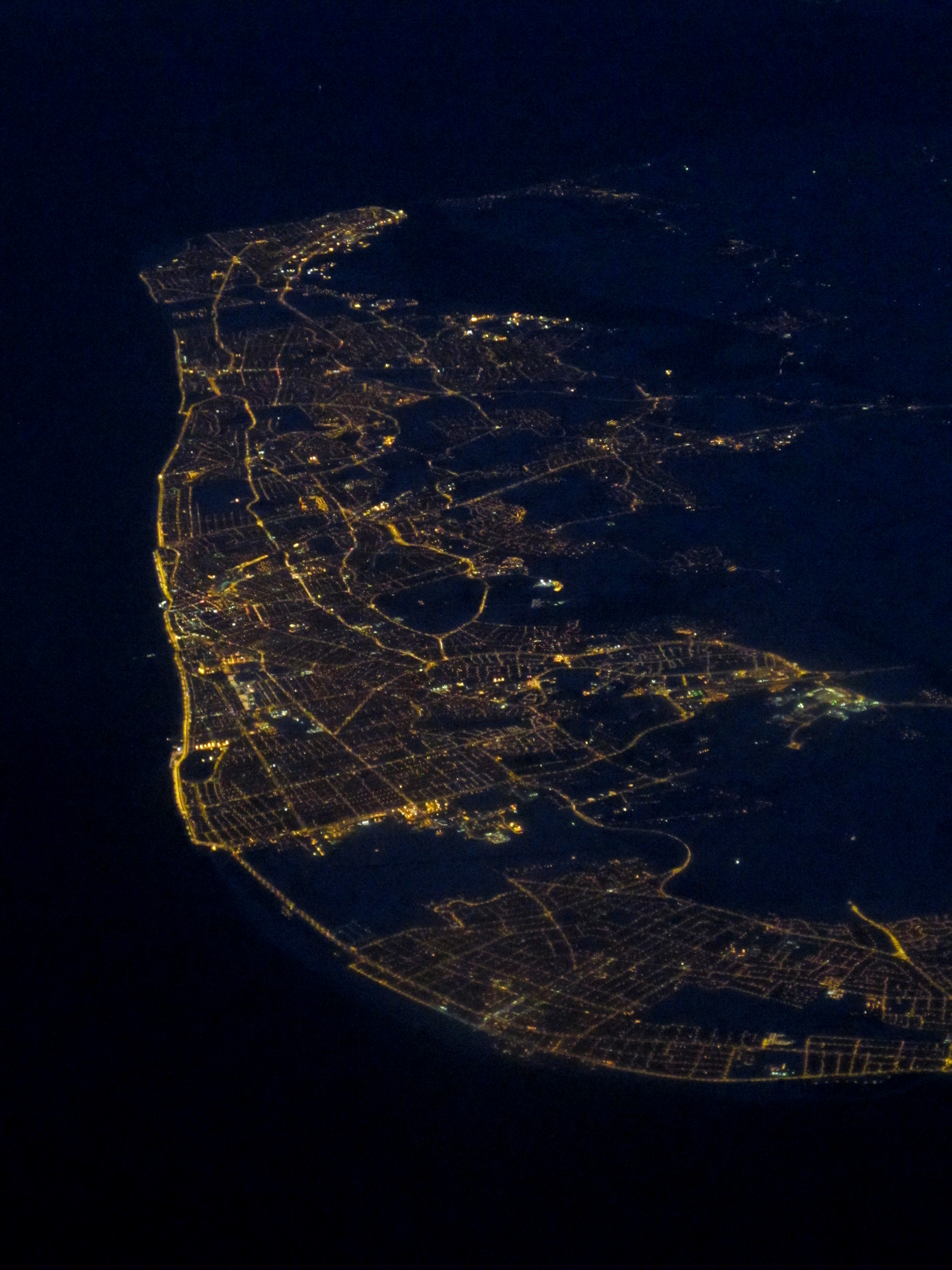
Fylde coast, aerial photograph

== See also ==
- Public transport in the Fylde
- Fylde Rugby Club
- Fylde (UK Parliament constituency) (1983 to date)
- Fylde Sand Dunes Project
- Blackpool & Fylde Aero Club v Blackpool Borough Council [1990] EWCA Civ 13 is a leading English contract law case on the issue of offer and acceptance in relation to Call for Bids such as in tendering.
