= Borough of Wyre =

Coordinates: 53.900°N 2.809°W

Wyre
- Borough and non-metropolitan district
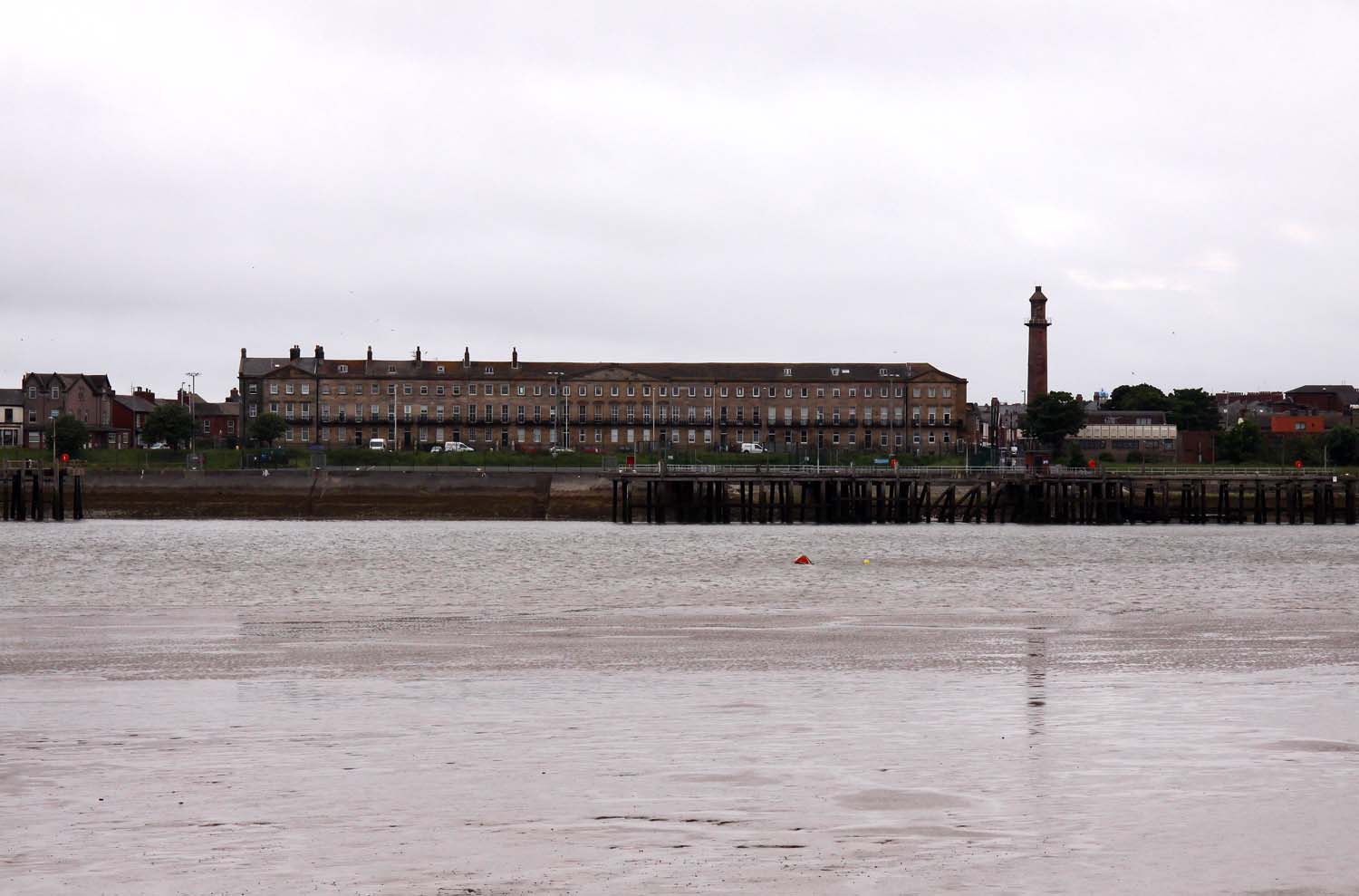
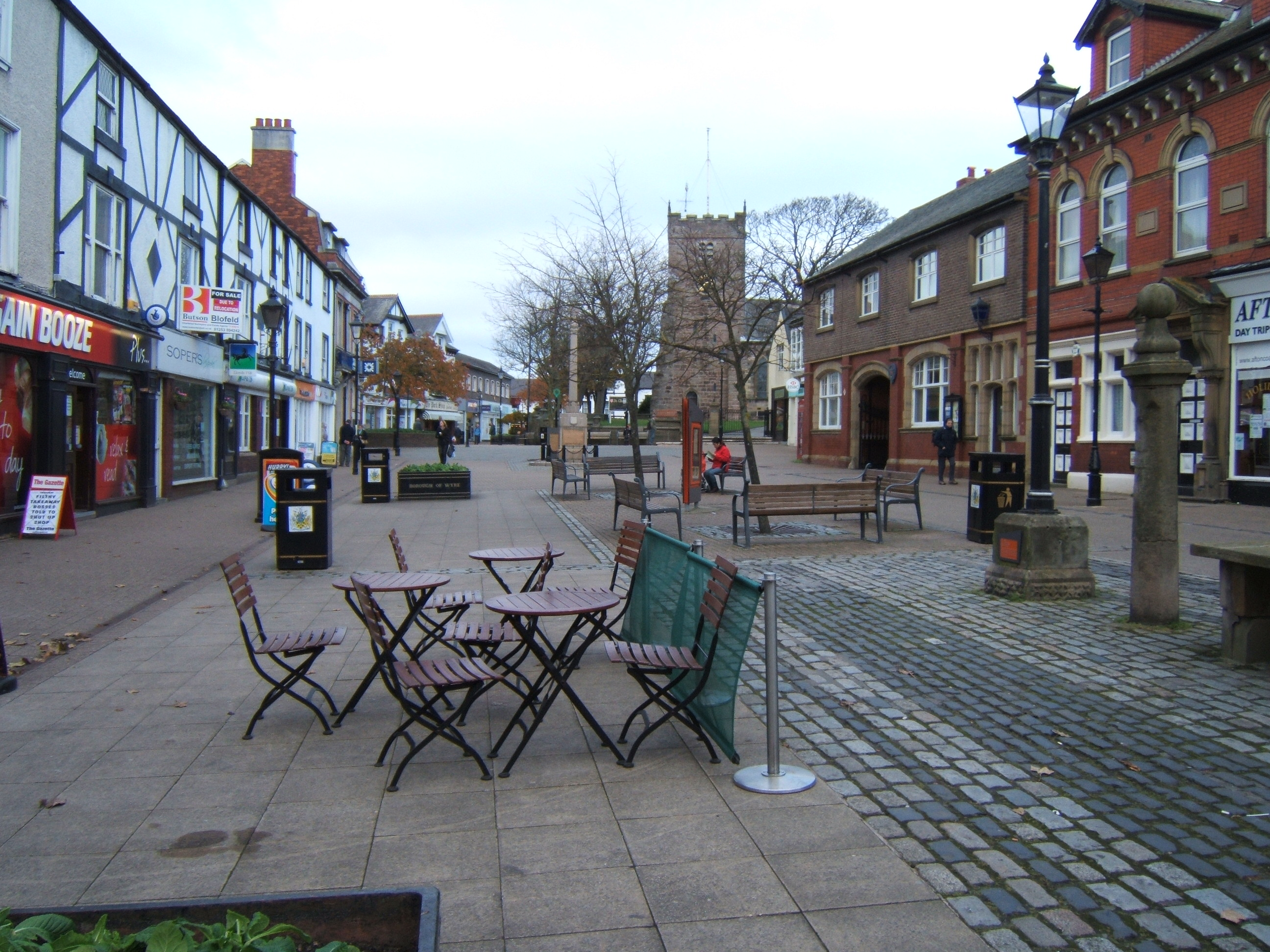
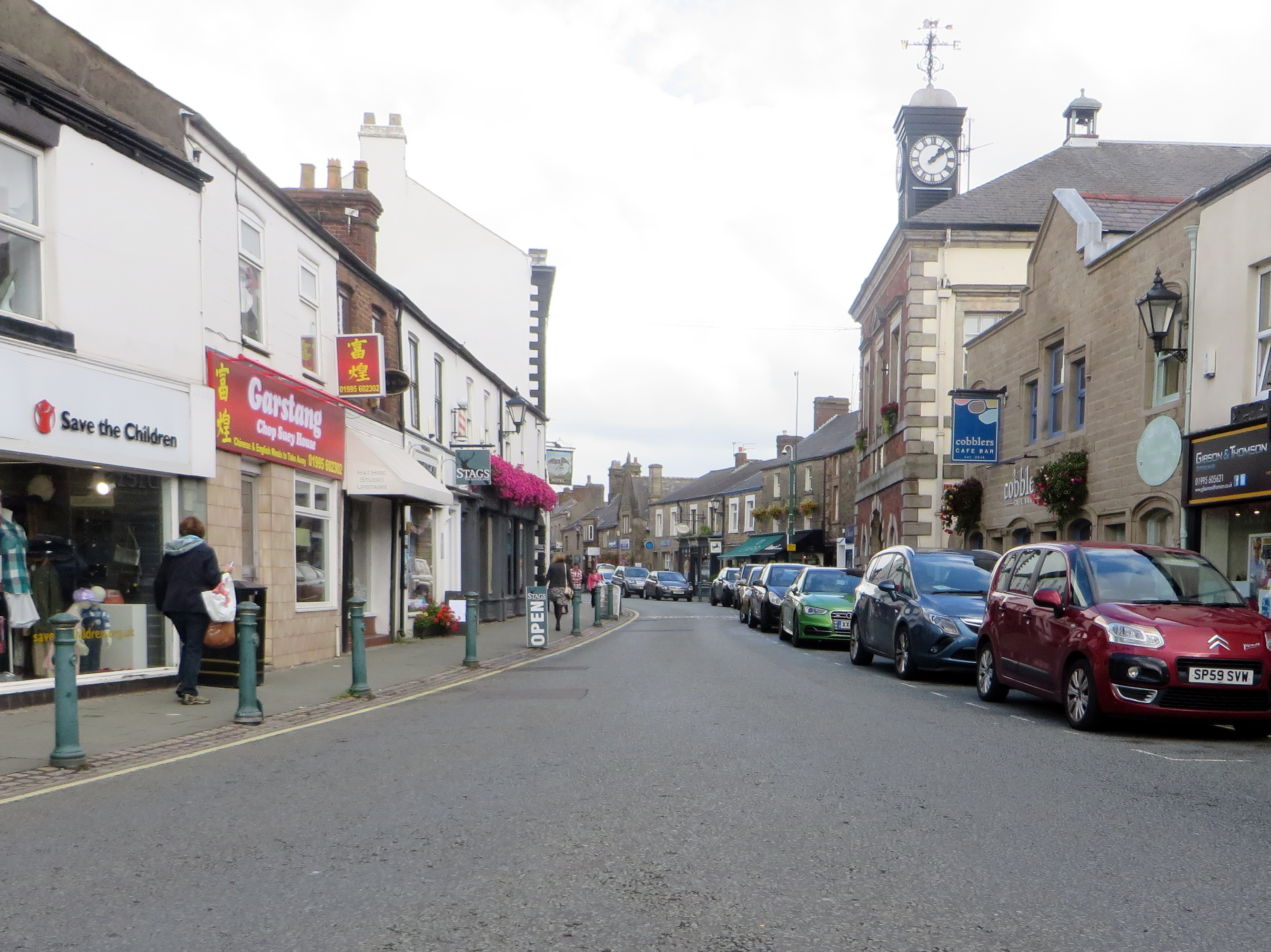
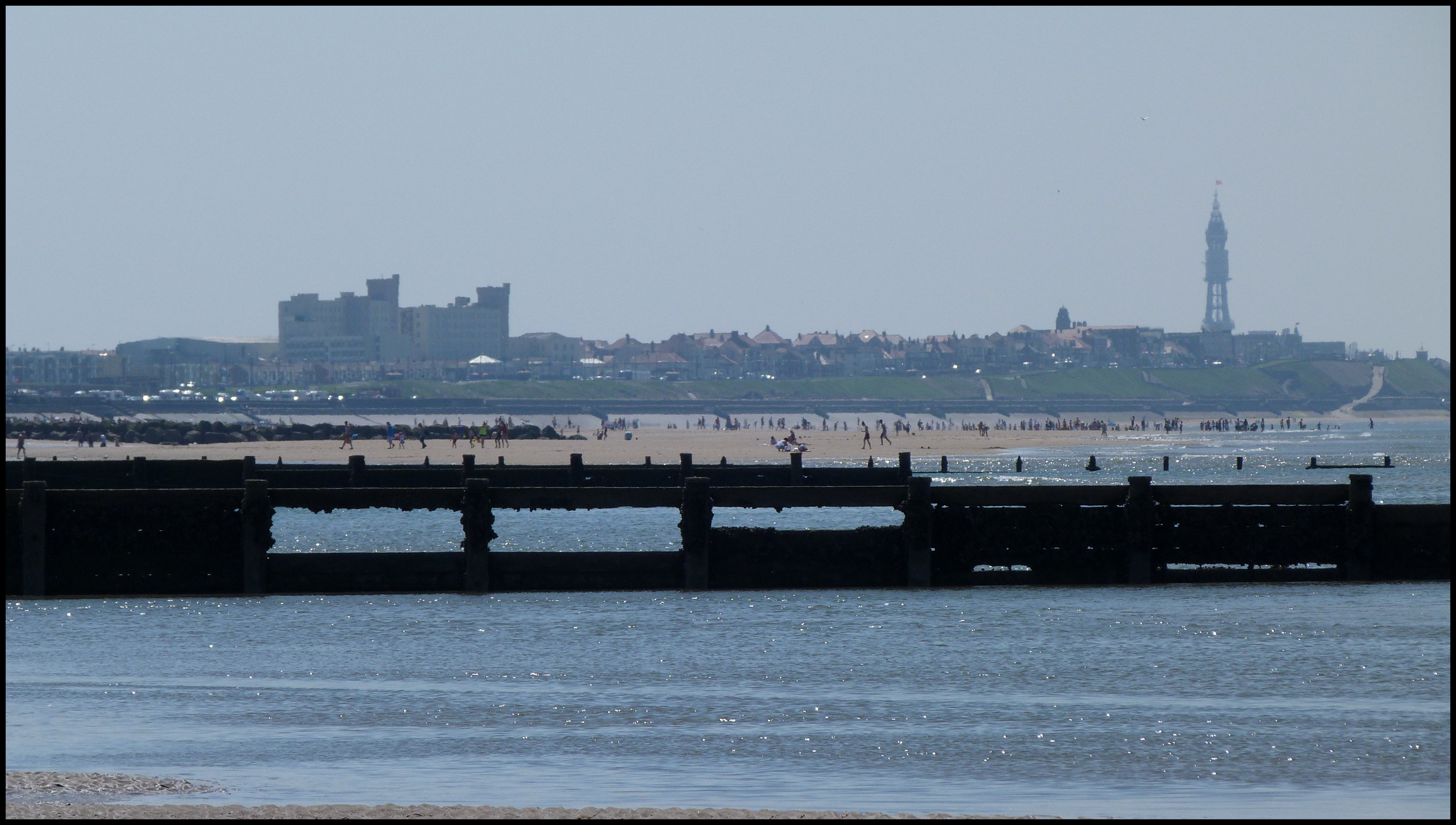
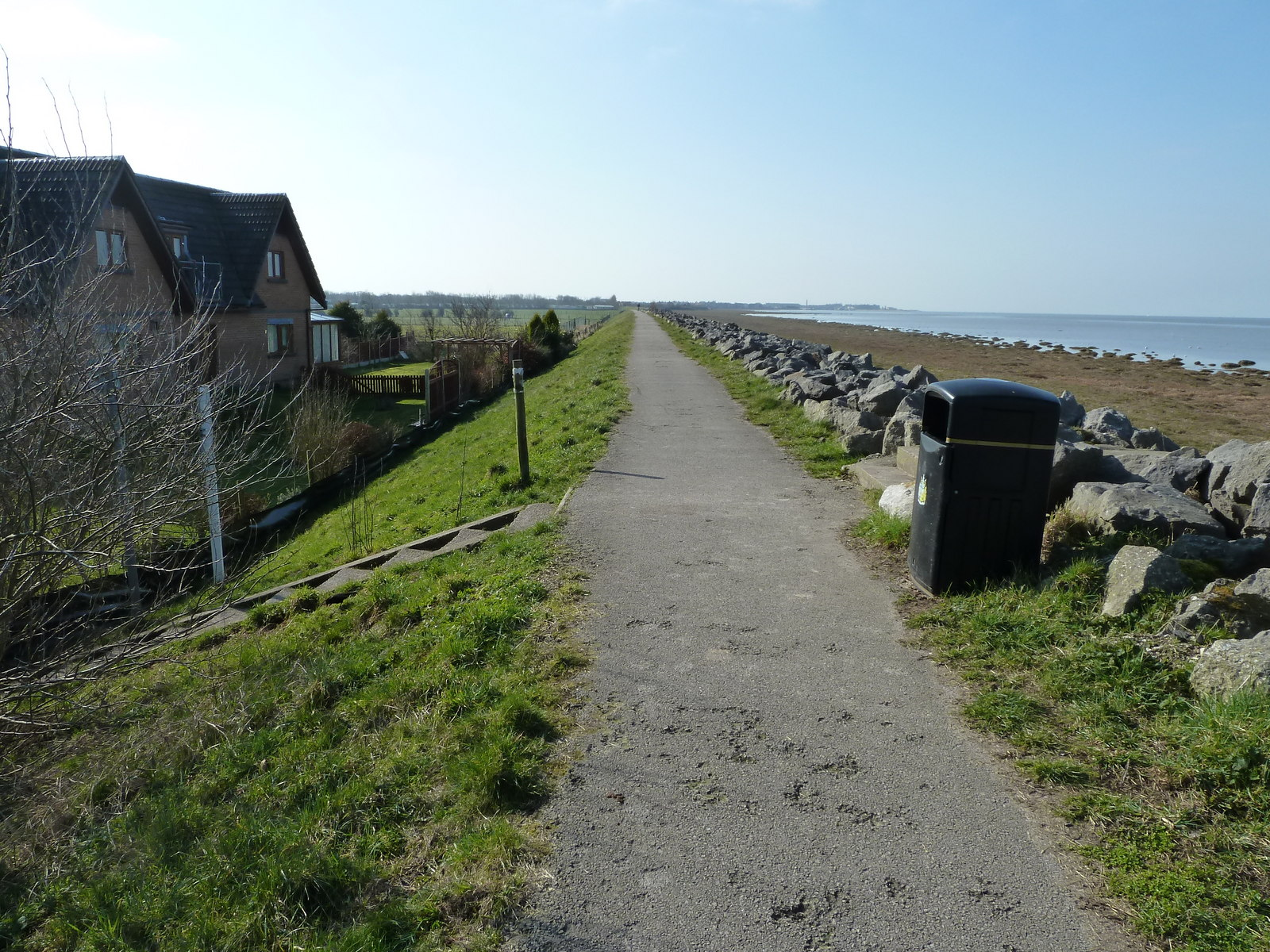
- From left to right; Top: Fleetwood from across the Wyre Esturary; Middle: Poulton-le-Fylde and Garstang town centres; Bottom: Thornton-Cleveleys seafront with Blackpool in the distance and Preesall coastal path on the Wyre Coast

- Wyre shown within Lancashire and England
- Sovereign state: United Kingdom
- Constituent country: England
- Region: North West England
- Ceremonial county: Lancashire
- Founded: 1974
- Admin. HQ: Poulton-le-Fylde

Government
  - Type: Wyre Borough Council
  - MPs: Lorraine Beavers, Cat Smith

Area
  - Total: 109 sq mi (282 km^{2})
  - Rank: 125th

Population (2024)
  - Total: 118,743
  - Rank: 210th
  - Density: 1,090/sq mi (421/km^{2})

Ethnicity (2021)
  - Ethnic groups: List: 97.5% White; 1% Mixed; 1% Asian; 0.3% other; 0.2% Black

Religion (2021)
  - Religion: List: 59.8% Christianity; 33.7% no religion; 5.1% not stated; 0.4% other; 0.4% Islam; 0.3% Buddhism; 0.2% Hinduism; 0.1% Judaism; 0.1% Sikhism
- Time zone: UTC+0 (Greenwich Mean Time)
  - Summer (DST): UTC+1 (British Summer Time)
- ONS code: 30UQ (ONS); E07000128 (GSS)

Wyre is a local government district with borough status on the coast of Lancashire, England. The council is based in Poulton-le-Fylde and the borough also contains the towns of Cleveleys, Fleetwood, Garstang, Preesall and Thornton, along with numerous villages and surrounding rural areas. Some of the borough's built-up areas form part of the wider Blackpool urban area. Eastern parts of the borough lie within the Forest of Bowland, a designated Area of Outstanding Natural Beauty.

The borough is named after the River Wyre, which runs through the area and meets the sea at Fleetwood. There are no road or rail connections between the parts of the borough either side of the Wyre estuary, and it is necessary to cross the neighbouring Fylde district in order to travel between the two parts of Wyre, or else use the Wyre Estuary Ferry between Fleetwood and Knott End.

The neighbouring districts are Blackpool, Fylde, Preston, Ribble Valley and Lancaster.

== History ==
The district was created on 1 April 1974 under the Local Government Act 1972, as a non-metropolitan district covering the territory of five former districts, which were abolished at the same time:

- Fleetwood Municipal Borough
- Garstang Rural District
- Poulton-le-Fylde Urban District
- Preesall Urban District
- Thornton-Cleveleys Urban District

The new district was named Wyre after the River Wyre. The new district was awarded borough status from its creation, allowing the chair of the council to take the title of mayor.

Under current local government reorganisation plans, all district councils in Lancashire, as well as the county council, will be abolished in 2028, with the district combining with the existing Blackpool unitary and the adjacent borough of Fylde to form a new Fylde Coast unitary authority.

== Governance ==
Wyre Borough Council

Type
- Type: Non-metropolitan district

Leadership
- Mayor: Steve Nicholls, Conservative since 15 May 2025
- Leader: Michael Vincent, Conservative since 1 December 2022
- Chief Executive: Rebecca Huddleston since 1 April 2023

Structure
- Seats: 50 councillors
- Graph of the party split among 50 seats.
- Political groups: Administration (27) Conservative (27) Other parties (23) Labour (15) Reform (4) Independent (4)

Elections
- Voting system: Plurality block voting
- Last election: 4 May 2023
- Next election: 6 May 2027

Meeting place
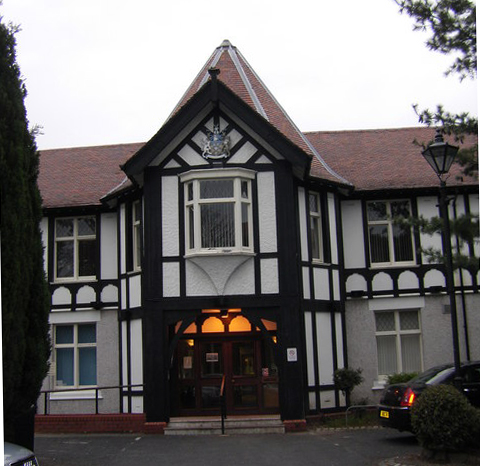
- Civic Centre, Breck Road, Poulton-le-Fylde, FY6 7PU

Website
- www.wyre.gov.uk

Wyre Borough Council, which styles itself "Wyre Council", provides district-level services. County-level services are provided by Lancashire County Council. Much of the borough is covered by civil parishes, which form a third tier of local government.

=== Political control ===
The council has been under Conservative majority control since 1999.

The first election to the council was held in 1973, initially operating as a shadow authority alongside the outgoing authorities until coming into its powers on 1 April 1974. Since 1974 political control of the council has been as follows:

Party in control	Years
Conservative	1974–1995
Labour	1995–1999
Conservative	1999–present

=== Leadership ===
The role of mayor is largely ceremonial in Wyre. Political leadership is instead provided by the leader of the council. The leaders since 2010 have been:

Councillor	Party	From	To
Russ Forsyth	Conservative		Mar 2010
Peter Gibson	Conservative	Mar 2010	28 Sep 2017
David Henderson	Conservative	7 Dec 2017	30 Nov 2022
Michael Vincent	Conservative	1 Dec 2022	

=== Composition ===
Following the 2023 election, and subsequent by-elections and changes of allegiance up to September 2026, the composition of the council was:

Party	Seats
Conservative	27
Labour	15
Reform	4
Independent	4
Total	50

Two of the independent councillors sit together as the "Wyre Independent Group". The next election is due in 2027.

=== Elections ===
Since the last boundary changes in 2015 the council has comprised 50 councillors representing 24 wards, with each ward electing one, two or three councillors. Elections are held every four years.

Wyre straddles three parliamentary constituencies: Lancaster and Wyre, Blackpool North and Fleetwood, and Flyde.

UK Youth Parliament

Although the UK Youth Parliament is an apolitical organisation, the elections are run in a way similar to that of the Local Elections. The votes come from 11 to 18-year olds and are combined to make the decision of the next, 2-year Member of Youth Parliament. The elections are run at different times across the country with Wyre's typically being in early Spring and bi-annually.

=== Premises ===
The council is based at the Civic Centre on Breck Road in Poulton-le-Fylde. The building was originally a large house called Woodlands, later serving as a convalescent hospital and teacher training college before becoming the council's headquarters in 1988.

== Towns and parishes ==
Much of the borough is covered by civil parishes. The parish councils for Fleetwood, Garstang and Preesall have declared their parishes to be towns, allowing them to take the style "town council". The former urban districts of Poulton-le-Fylde and Thornton-Cleveleys form an unparished area.

Civil parishes in the Borough of Wyre

1. Barnacre-with-Bonds
2. Bleasdale
3. Cabus
4. Catterall
5. Claughton
6. Fleetwood (town)
7. Forton
8. Garstang (town)
9. Great Eccleston
10. Hambleton
11. Inskip-with-Sowerby
12. Kirkland
13. Myerscough and Bilsborrow
14. Nateby
15. Nether Wyresdale
16. Out Rawcliffe
17. Pilling
18. Preesall (town)
19. Stalmine-with-Staynall
20. Upper Rawcliffe with Tarnacre
21. Winmarleigh
Towns, villages and hills in the Borough of Wyre Forest of Bowland AONB

== Freedom of the Borough ==
The following people and military units have received the Freedom of the Borough of Wyre.

- Doreen Lofthouse: 13 June 2003.
- The Duke of Lancaster's Regiment: 12 April 2018.
