= Bernasconi (surname) =

Bernasconi or Bernaskoni is an Italian surname. Notable people with the surname include:

- Alfonso Bernasconi, founder of the settlement of Bernasconi, Argentina.
- Andrea Bernasconi (1706–1784), Italian composer
- Antonia Bernasconi (1741–1803), German opera singer
- Antonio Bernasconi (stuccoist) (1726–1805), Swiss-Italian stuccoist in Russia
- Antonio Bernasconi (architect) (1710–1785), Italian architect
- Attilio Bernasconi (1905–1971), Argentine footballer
- Bautista Bernasconi (born 2001), Argentine rugby union player
- Bernardo Bernasconi (1839–1923), the namesake of the Bernasconi Hills in Southern California
- Boris Bernaskoni (1977–), Russian architect
- Daniel Bernasconi (1970–), British America’s Cup yacht designer
- Daniele Bernasconi (1992–), Italian footballer
- Domenico Bernasconi (1902–1978), Italian boxer
- Félix Bernasconi, the namesake of the Bernasconi Institute in Buenos Aires, Argentina
- Francis Bernasconi (1762–1841), English ornamental carver born in Italy
- Gaudenzio Bernasconi (1932–2023), Italian footballer
- George Henry Bernasconi (c. 1842–1916), English artist
- Giovanni Battista Belli-Bernasconi (1770–1827), a Russian architect
- Giuseppe Bernasconi (1778–1839), Russian architect of Swiss-Italian origins
- Humberto Bernasconi (1912–unknown), Uruguayan basketball player
- Irene Bernasconi, (1896–1989), Argentine marine biologist
- Ivan Bernasconi (1974–), Italian high jumper
- Laura Bernasconi, 17th C. Italian painter
- Luciano Bernasconi (1939–), Italian comic book artist
- Luigi Bernasconi (1910–1970), an Italian ski jumper
- Maria Roth-Bernasconi (1955–), Swiss politician
- Mario Bernasconi (sculptor) (1899–1963), Swiss-Italian sculptor
- Mario Bernasconi (general) (1892–1976), Italian aviator and Air Force general
- Michelangelo Bernasconi (1901–1943), an Italian rower
- Patrick Bernasconi (1955–), French business executive
- Robert Bernasconi (1950–), Philosopher
- Socorro Hernandez-Bernasconi (1941–), Mexican-American teacher and activist

== See also ==
- Bernasconi family
