= Bernasconi =

Bernasconi might refer to:

== People ==
- Bernasconi (surname)
- Bernasconi family

== Places ==
- Bernasconi, Argentina, a village
- Bernasconi Hills (and Pass), a mountain range and pass in Southern California, United States
- Bernasconi Institute, a primary school in Buenos Aires, Argentina
- 7848 Bernasconi, a minor planet
