= Antonio Bernasconi =

Antonio Bernasconi may refer to:

- Antonio Bernasconi (stuccoist) (1726–1805), Russian stuccoist born in Switzerland
- Antonio Bernasconi (architect) (1710–1785), Italian archaeologist and architect

== See also ==
- Antonia Bernasconi (1741–1803), German operatic soprano
