= Boris Bernaskoni =

Russian architect

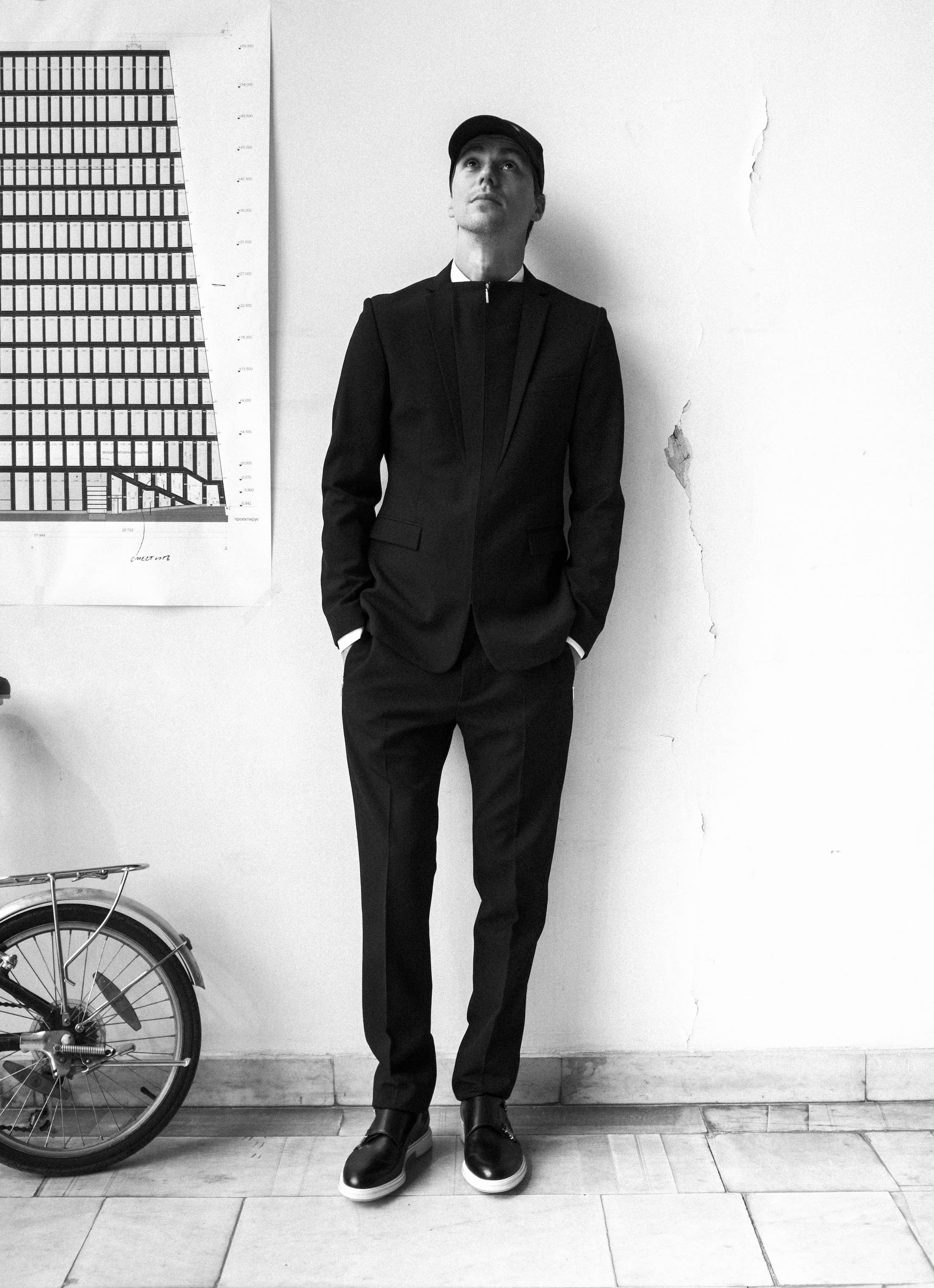
- Born: 26 February 1977 (age 49); Moscow
- Occupation: Architect
- Awards: Architizer A+ Awards, ArchiWood Award
- Practice: BERNASKONI bureau
- Website: www.bernaskoni.com

Boris Bernaskoni (Russian: Борис Бернаскони; born 26 February 1977) is a Russian architect, engineer, and publisher. He is the founder of the BERNASKONI bureau and a founding member of the Urban Council Board at the Skolkovo Innovation Center in Moscow. He first achieved recognition in 2008 for designing Perm Museum of Modern Art. In 2016, he participated in the 15th Venice Biennale of Architecture, and in 2019, he participated in several events at the Davos World Economic Forum discussing flexible architecture in the cities of the future and urban digitalization.

== Background ==
Bernaskoni is Russian and was born in Moscow, but inherits his surname from a family of Swiss-Italian immigrants to Russia in the late eighteenth century. The Bernasconi family of Lugano had produced many baroque and classical artists, stuccoists and architects who were active across Europe. Bernaskoni's ancestors came to Russia work on the palaces of Saint Petersburg and its environs, and include such figures as Antonio and Giuseppe Bernasconi.

== Education ==
Bernaskoni graduated in Architecture from the Moscow Academy of Architecture, having studied in the department of "Housing and Social Design Construction" under the supervision of Professors Belov, Khazanov and Pakhomov.

== Teaching ==
In 2001 he led a "sense analyses" seminar for students of the Moscow Academy of Architecture. Since 2003 he has been a lecturer at the Moscow Academy of Architecture's Urban Planning department. In 2004 he has led a project seminar in New York for students of the Moscow Academy of Architecture invited by the Harvard Design School.

== Architectural works ==
Bernaskoni set up his interdisciplinary practice as soon as he graduated in 2000.

=== Projects ===
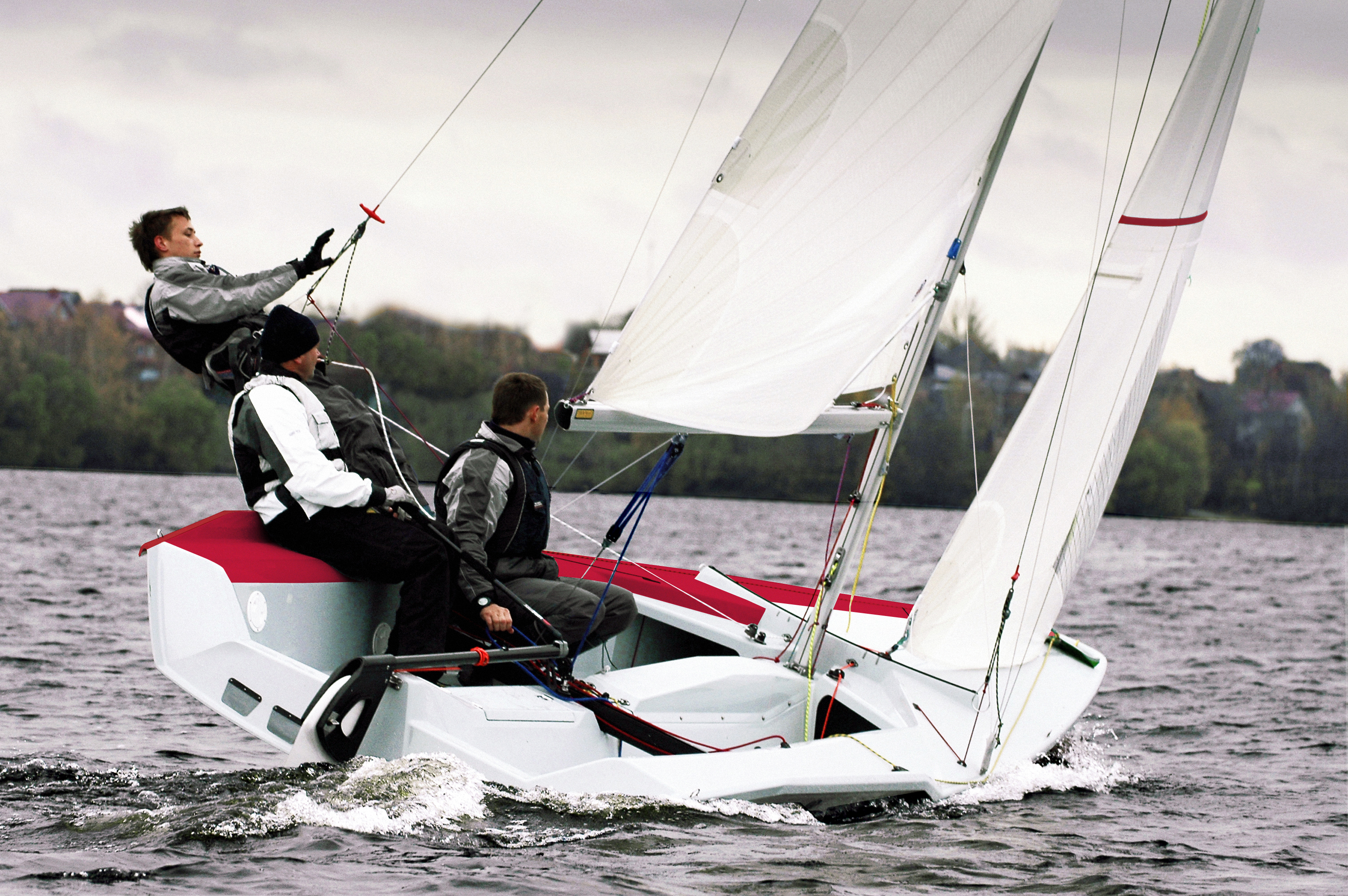
EM KA sailboat

- Place Memorial on Lubyanskaya Square (Moscow, 2000)
- Tetris living towers at Izmailovo (Moscow, 2002)
- Immaterialbox pavilion (Moscow, 2002)
- BBDO Moscow office building (2003)
- Mediacity conversion of factory workshops into new cinema studios (Moscow, 2004)
- Grand Cru, net vine store (Moscow, 2004)
- Krasny Oktyabr territory developing concept (Moscow, 2005)
- Press Center of the Government of Russia (2006)
- OLEGKULIK exhibition (Moscow, 2007)
- Kandinsky Prize exhibition (Moscow in 2007, London in 2010)
- Magazinzing fashion store (2008)
- EM-KA sailing boat (2008)
- PERMMUSEUMXXI, international competition, first prize (2008)
- Russian Pavilion at the Shanghai EXPO-2010, national competition, first prize (2008)
- Museum for Architecture Art and Design in Oslo, competition (2009)
- Ragout, cafe bar interior (Moscow, 2010)
- Paparazzi, restaurant interior (Yekaterinburg, 2010)
- Volgadacha, designer villa (2010)
- Hypercube, innovative building (Skolkovo, 2010)
- New Holland Summer, masterplan (Saint Petersburg, 2011)
- Preobrazhensky masterplan (Yaroslavl Oblast, 2011)
- Mirror Mongayt, designer villa (2012)
- Arc (Nikola-Lenivets, Kaluga Oblast, 2012)
- Boris Yeltsin Presidential Center (2015)
- Matrex (Skolkovo, 2017)

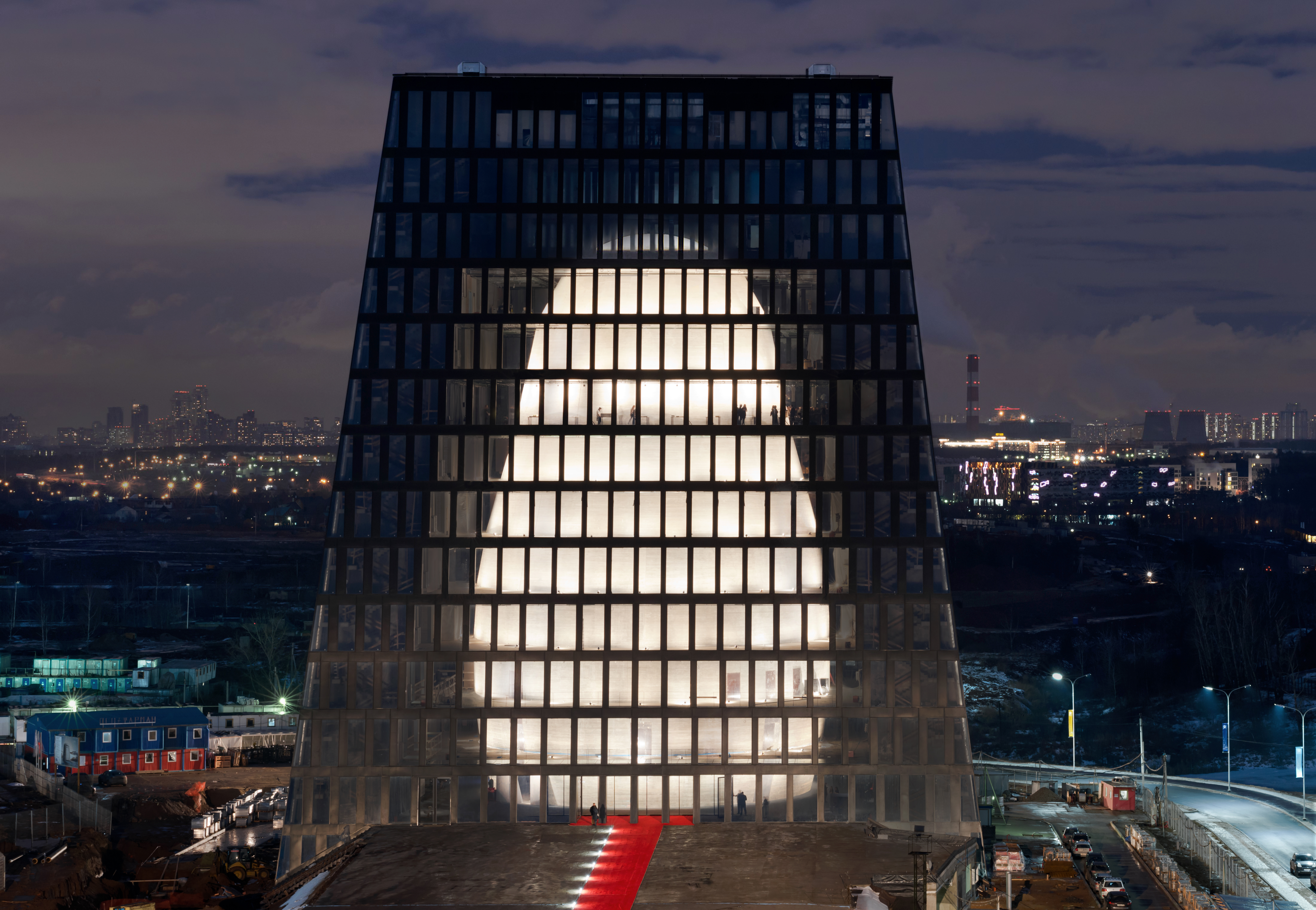
MATREX at Skolkovo.

==== Matrex ====
Matrex was built at the Skolkovo Innovation Center in 2015 near the Skoltech Complex. This project provides a basis for the development of informational and energy efficient technologies, with a special emphasis on transparency of space and work. The mixed-use building combines Class A and startup offices, apartments, the transforming hall, the spiral museum (exhibit spiral), the restaurant. The truncated pyramid contains an internal space in the form of a giant Matryoshka, or Russian nestling doll.

==== Yeltsin Centre ====
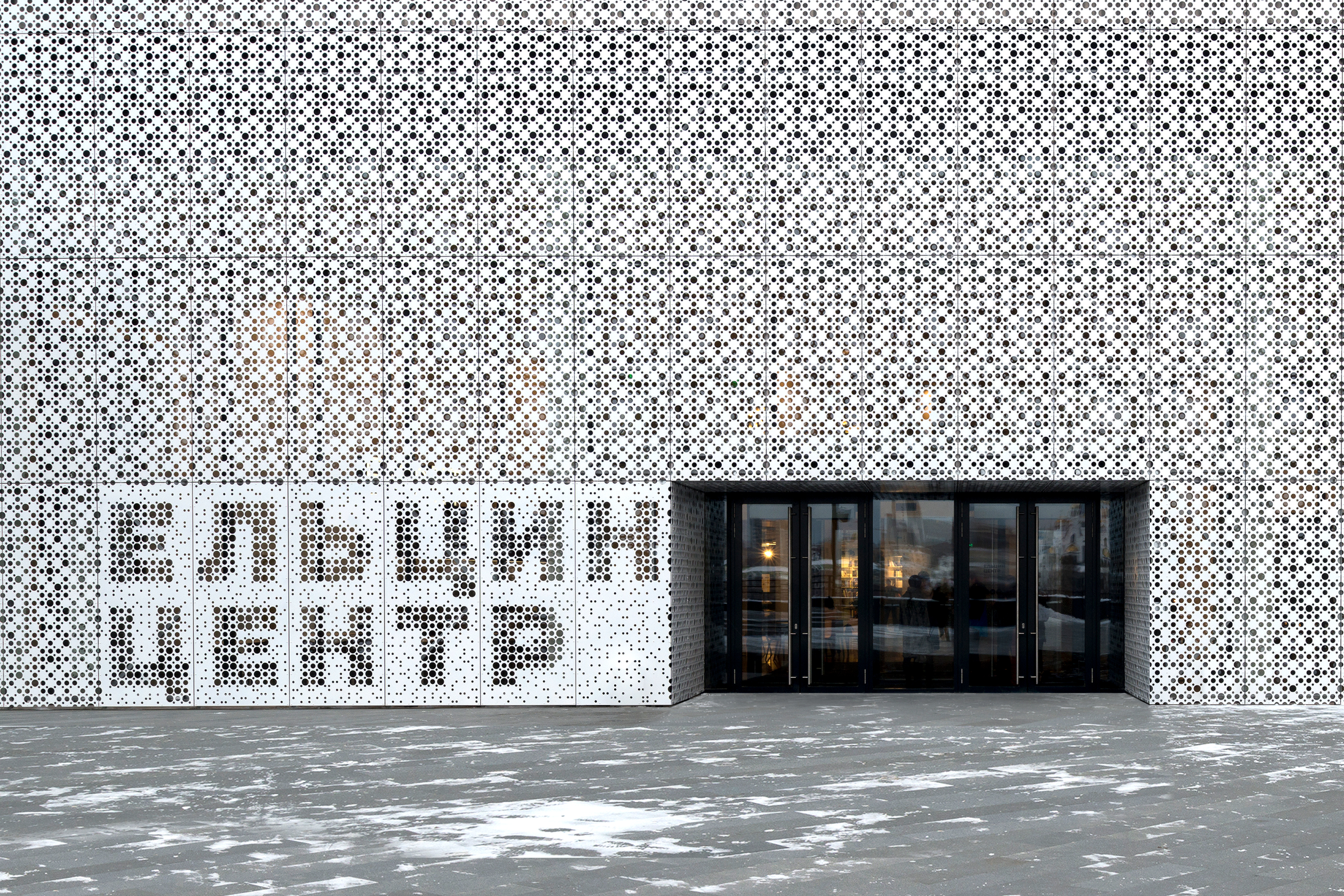
Yeltsin Centre, Yekaterinburg

A first for Russia, the Yeltsin Center is a presidential centre on the model of US presidential libraries. It is a social, cultural and educational institution built in the city of Yekaterinburg, birthplace of President Boris Yeltsin. The centre houses a museum (2016's European Museum of the Year), art gallery, educational centre, documentary film centre, bookshop, café and other public facilities. Due to lack of vacant sites, Bernaskoni redesigned an existing business centre, to which he added a new form. This was achieved mainly through a curtain wall, covering half the premises in a sheet of steel, perforated with a series of openings displaying rotational symmetry. The resultant Center is a modest and neutral structure that nevertheless has a visual identity and silhouette distinct from any other building in Yekaterinburg, which the architect has characterized as its “urban supergraphics”.

==== Hypercube ====
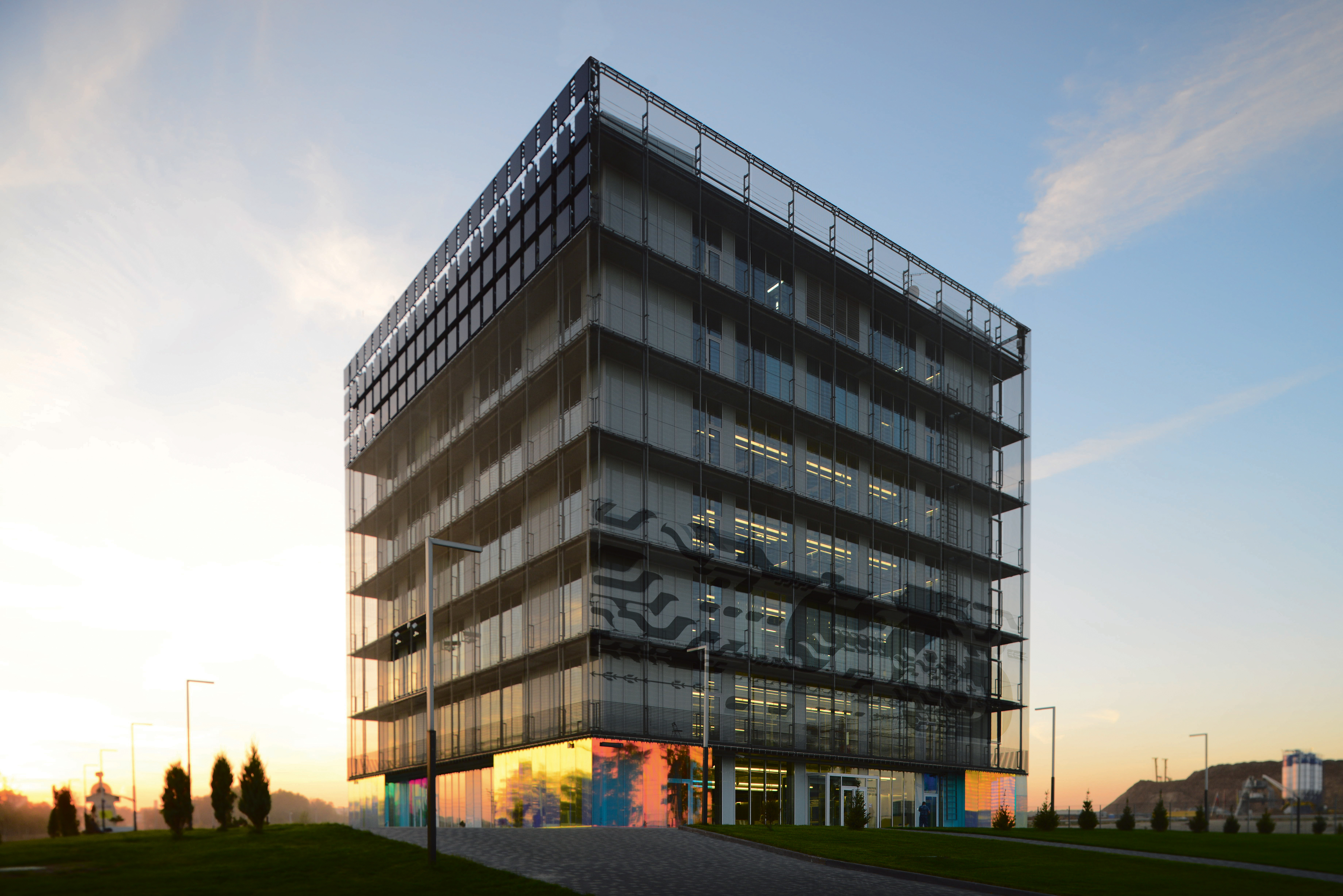
HYPERCUBE / Iliya Ivanov

Hypercube is the first building at the Skolkovo Innovation Center. The decision to erect the Hypercube building was made by Russian president Dmitry Medvedev in 2010. The building is a platform for communication, combining the roles of a public space and generator for new start-up enterprises, and part of a university campus. The building has its own energy and water supplyautonomous systems. Hypercube was built in accordance with the green standard "Leadership in Energy & Environmental Design" (LEED v3).

==== Arc ====
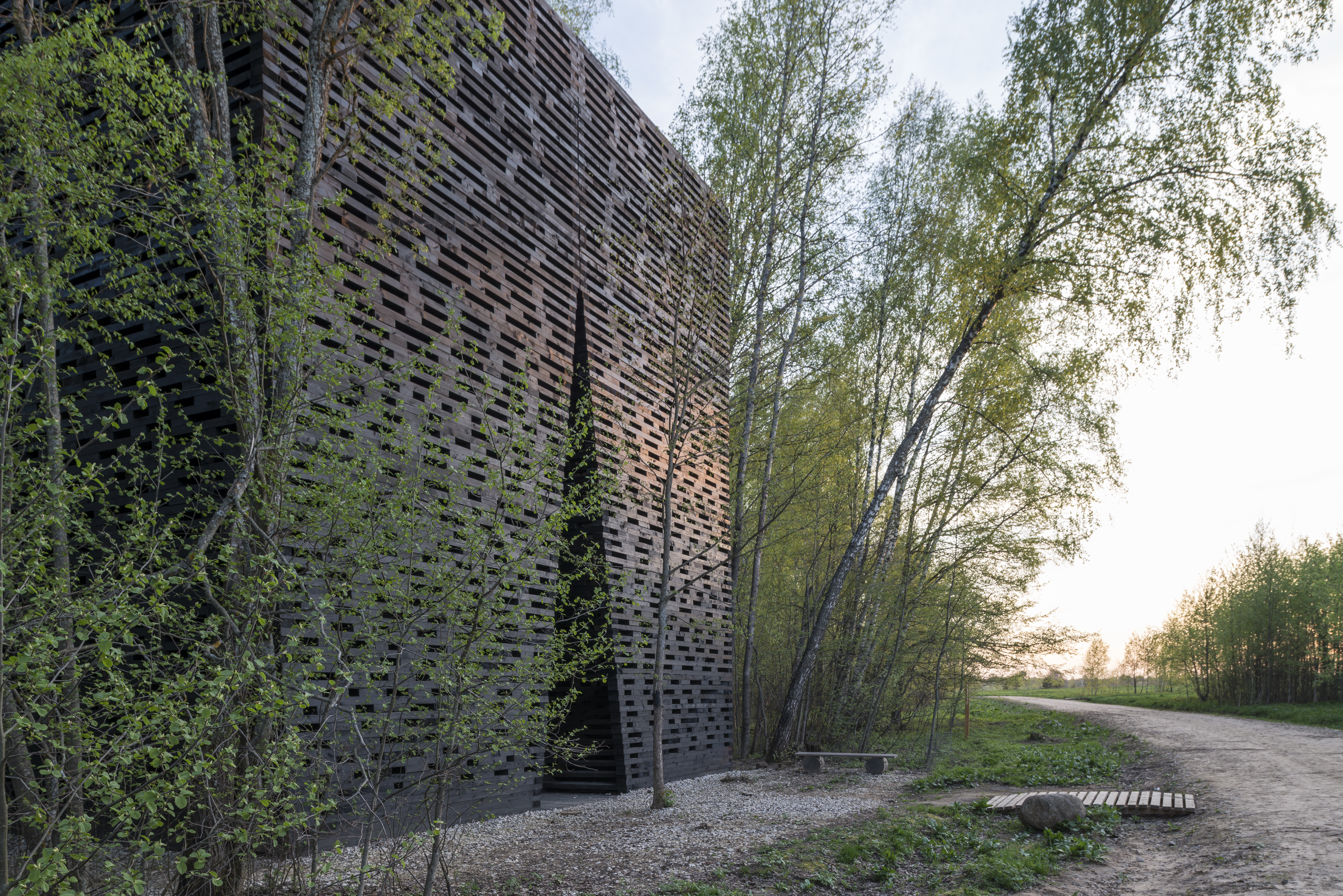
ARC

The Arc pavilion was created especially for Archstoyanie, an architecture festival held in Nikola-Lenivets, Russia. Arc stands on the border between forest and field. Its wooden elements are stacked on top of each other with gaps forming rooms and stairs leading up to a viewpoint. The interior is annually transformed into an art installation. The materials Arc is made of are to be reused for useful construction or fuel for domestic heating purposes.

==== Mirror Mongayt ====
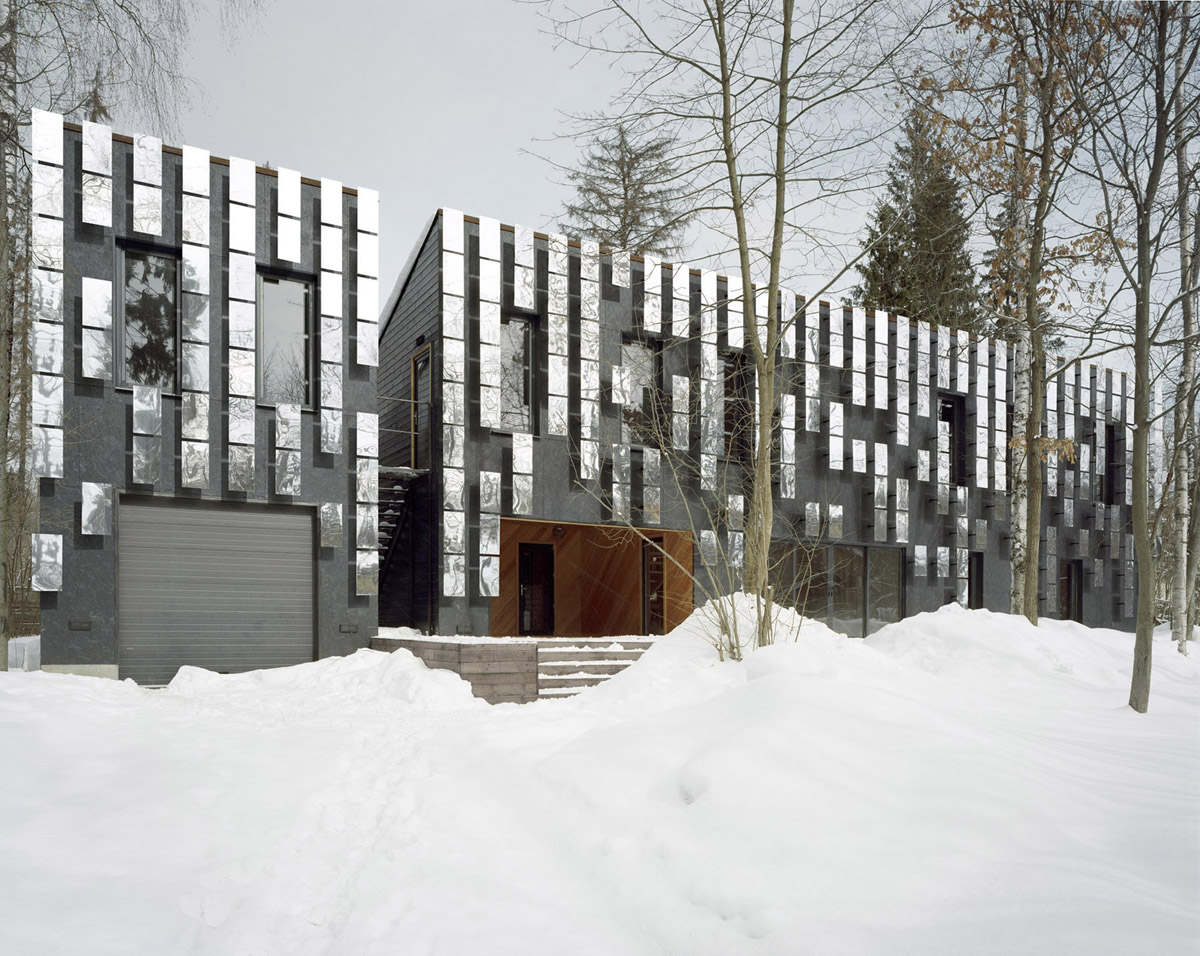
MIRROR MONGAYT

Bernaskoni solves the problem of how to build an eco-friendly designer villa with a small budget. The front facade is designed as a temporary structure made up of mirror panels. It is assumed that the facade will change every eight years. The space inside is vast, with high ceilings, open plan spaces and an abundance of bare wood.

== Books ==
=== MATREX, August 2016 ===
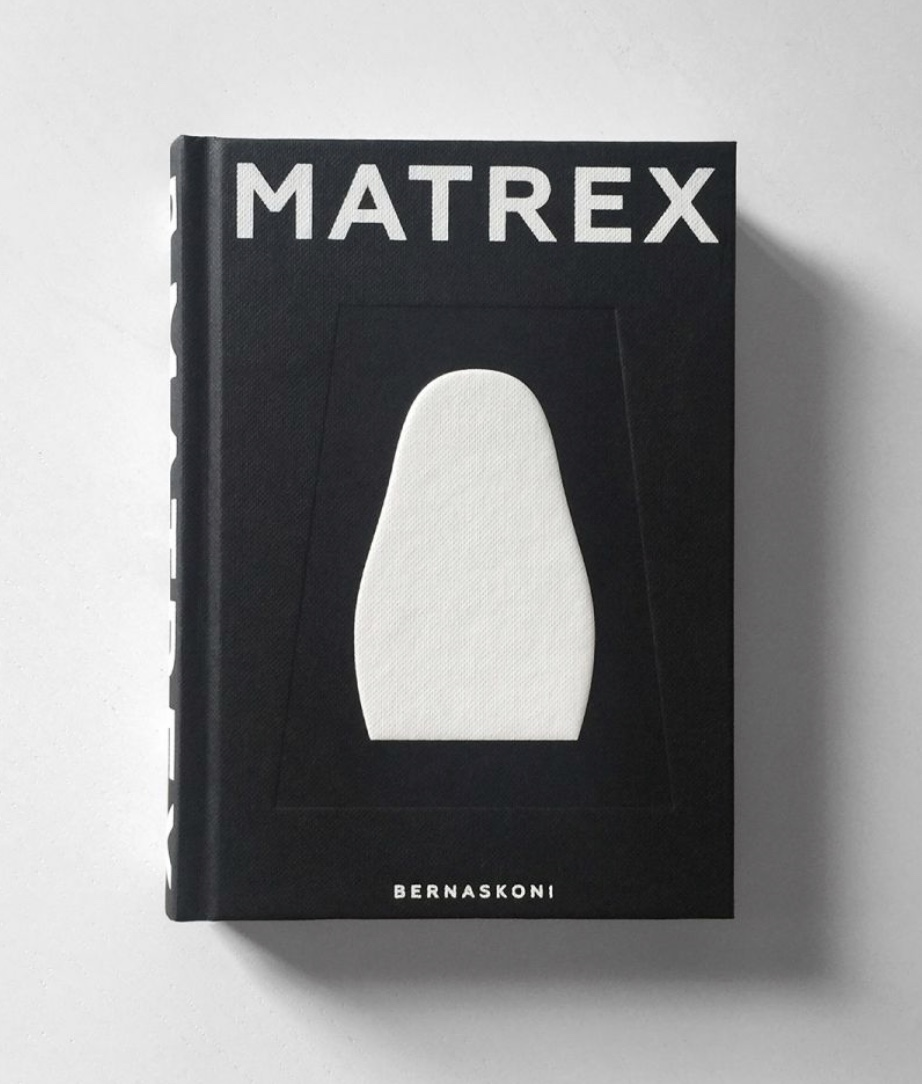
MATREX book

The book forms an integral part of the Matrex exhibition project at the Venice Biennale of Architecture. In tracing the unconventional cultural histories of the Matryoshka and the Pyramid, the book discovers their various interconnections, with the core of the publication covering the concept, architecture and program of the Matrex building at the Skolkovo Innovation Center.

=== Hypercube, May 2015 ===
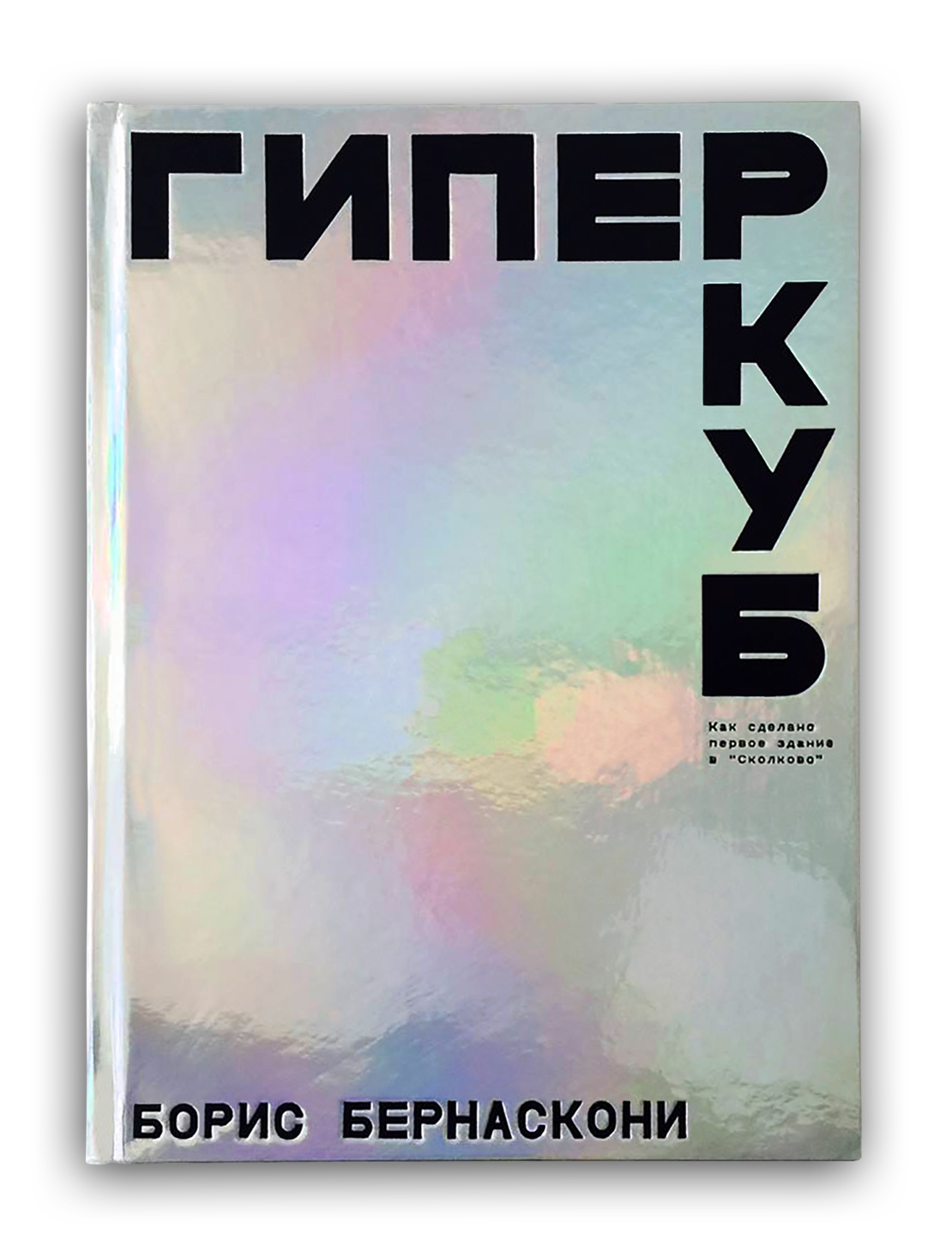
HYPERCUBE book

This book is about the ideology, programme, technologies and aesthetics of the Hypercube. The study will focus on the materials, solutions and technologies that enable the building to respond to global energy, ecological, social and economic challenges.

=== Interface Antifoster, August 2008 ===
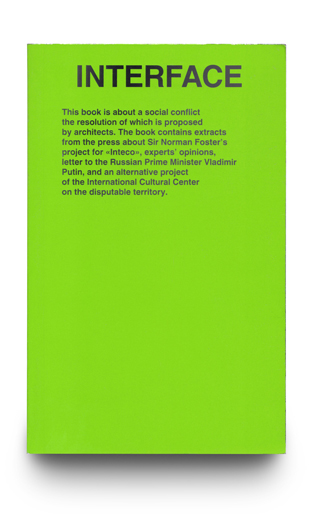
INTERFACE book

This book is about architects' solutions to a social dispute. The book contains extracts from publications on Norman Foster's projects for the "Inteco" development company, the opinions of experts, open letters to the Russian Prime Minister Vladimir Putin and architect Norman Foster, and an alternative project for an International Culture Center on the disputed territory.

=== MUSEЙ, May 2008 ===
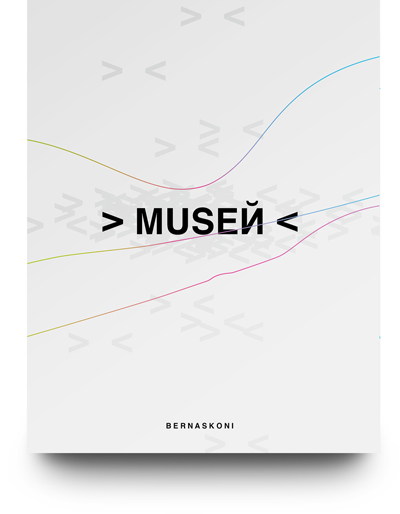
MUSEЙ book

The book includes exhibits, exhibition spaces and museums designed by Bernaskoni bureau in 2000-2008. The projects are arranged in the following order: from exhibition pieces to a building, thereby demonstrating the idea of a gradual transformation of museum space from an introverted object (Message to Kazimir) into a spatial environment (PERMMUSEUMXXI). The book covers 12 projects, each of which reflects a different treatment of the idea of museum space.

== Exhibitions ==
- 2001 – "Underconstruction" pavilion at the Arch Moscow Exhibition
- 2001 – New Russian Flag Project at a private gallery in Moscow
- 2002 – Presentation of the Matrex project at the Arch Moscow Exhibition
- 2002 – "Message to Kazimir" at Art Moscow
- 2002 – Member of the Expert Board at the 7th International Exhibition of Architecture and Design Arch Moscow
- 2003 – Supervisor of the 8th International Exhibition of Architecture and Design Arch Moscow "PresentPerfect"
- 2003 – President's Cabinet, Design Innovation Award finalist Moscow Review of the Best work of Architecture in 2002–2003.
- 2003 – Winner of the year at Golden Section 2003
- 2004 – Supervisor of the 9th International Exhibition of Architecture and Design Arch Moscow "Dead End"
- 2006 – "Moscow 4" at the Mendrisio Academy, Switzerland
- 2008 – 11th Venice Biennale of Architecture. Bernaskoni used his space in the Russian pavilion to campaign against Norman Foster's controversial redevelopment plans for Moscow's Central House of Artists
- 2011 – Hypercube Skolkovo, at the Arch Moscow Exhibition
- 2012 – "Identity" project at the 3rd Moscow Biennale of Architecture
- 2012 – 13th Venice Biennale of Architecture
- 2013 – "Black" Exhibition of Nikolay Nasedkin, Moscow Museum of Modern Art, со-curator
- 2014 – Matrex preview at the Skolkovo Innovation Center, Moscow, curator
- 2016 – 15th Venice Biennale of Architecture. Bernaskoni showcased a model of the Matrex building, combining a pyramid with a Matryoshka-shaped open space

== Awards and recognition ==
- 2010 – Volgadacha awarded Best Russian Design of 2010.
- 2011 – Volgadacha won the Archiwood Award for the Country House category.
- 2012 – Hypercube won the Gold award at the Zodchestvo – 2012 International Festival of Architecture and Design.
- 2015 – Hypercube book won the Gold award at the Zhar-Kniga Russian National Book Design Competition.
