= Martha Salotti =

Argentine educator and writer

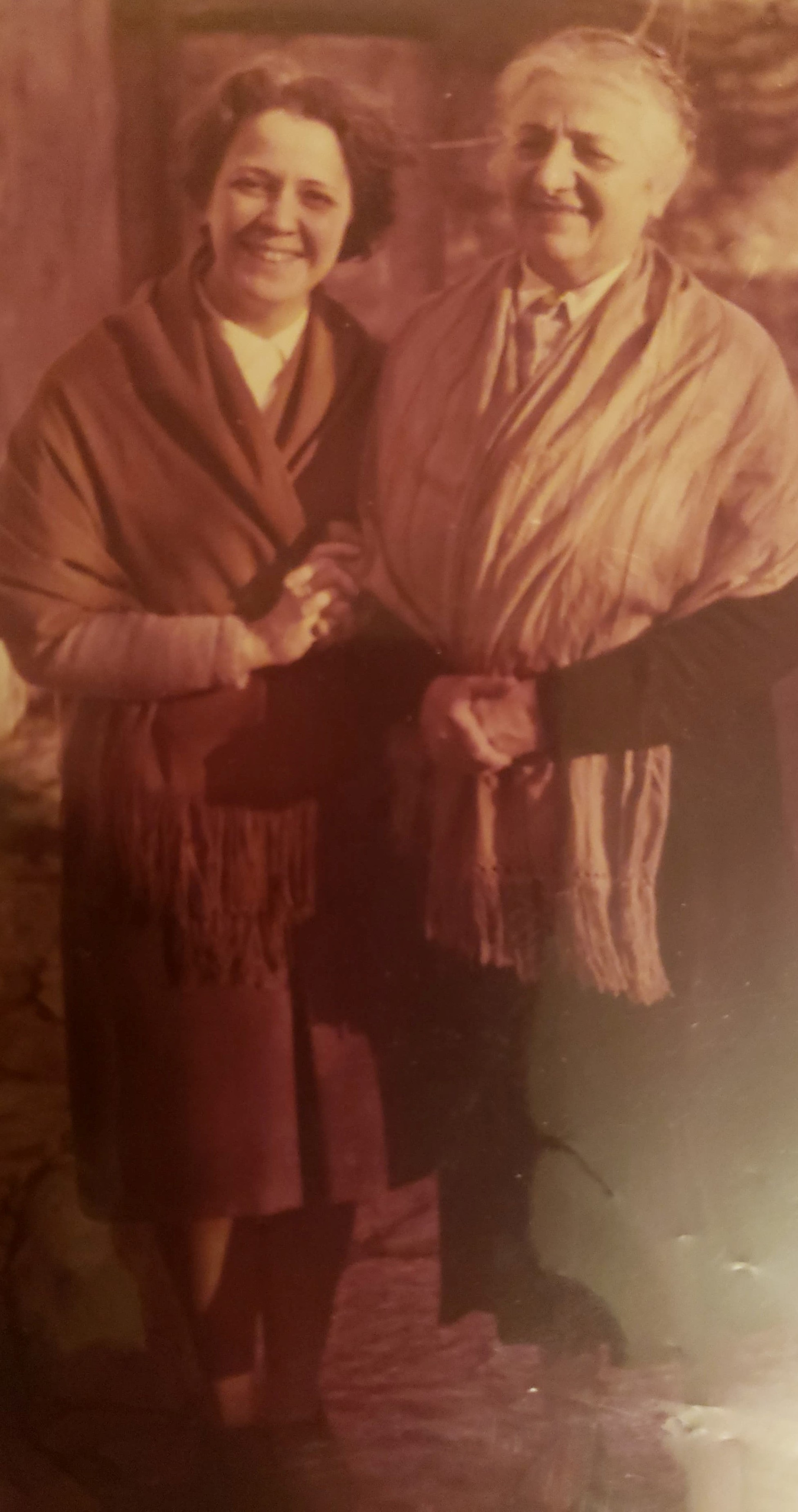
- Born: Martha Alcira Salotti; 10 April 1899; Buenos Aires, Argentina
- Died: 26 October 1980 (aged 81); Buenos Aires, Argentina
- Occupation(s): Writer, educator

Martha Alcira Salotti (10 April 1899 – 26 October 1980) was an Argentine educator and writer. A specialist in children's literature, she was considered the protégé and inheritor of the pedagogical work of Rosario Vera Peñaloza.

== Early life and career ==
Martha Salotti was born in Buenos Aires on 10 April 1899. She was a National Normal Teacher and a Higher Professor of Natural Sciences, who worked as a kindergarten teacher and then as a grade school teacher for 24 years. From 1957 to 1964, she was director of the prestigious Bernasconi Institute, located in the Parque Patricios neighborhood. It was home to a museum created by Rosario Vera Peñaloza, which Salotti worked to restructure and enhance.

She continued her educational work by organizing teacher improvement courses. Oral narration enjoyed a resurgence in Argentina when she created the Storytellers' Club. She instilled in teachers and students the practice of reading aloud, and oral narration as a contribution to the teaching of language.

== Pedagogy ==
On 10 May 1965, Salotti founded the SUMMA Institute in the Buenos Aires neighborhood of Caballito, together with Dora Pastoriza de Etchebarne. From a kindergarten with six students, it grew to include primary, secondary, and tertiary education. Starting in 1971, the Institute began a teacher training program for Spanish and literature, with a specialization in children's and young adult literature, the first of its kind in Latin America. This followed Salotti's educational philosophy:

From my mouth to your heart, and from your heart to your head.

Martha Salotti was the student, "spiritual daughter", and inheritor of the pedagogical work of Rosario Vera Peñaloza. After the latter's death, she edited twelve of her scientific texts. The San Martín National Institute presented her its top prize for her work on Credo Patriótico, and an award for a version of Vida del General San Martín adapted for children.

She was dedicated to the production of children's stories, reading books, and pedagogical texts on language teaching. She was also the founding president of the Argentine chapter of the International Board on Books for Young People (IBBY), and a numerary of the American Cultural Union.

She maintained a close friendship with the Chilean poet Gabriela Mistral, and became her representative in Buenos Aires.

Martha Salotti died in Buenos Aires on 26 October 1980.

== Legacy ==
A street is named for her in the Buenos Aires neighborhood of Puerto Madero.

Salotti's educational work is recognized throughout Argentina; sixteen educational establishments in the city of Buenos Aires and in the interior of the country bear her name, and a significant number of classrooms and libraries were named in her honor.

== Publications ==
- Enseñanza de la lengua: contribución experimental [Language Teaching: Experimental Contribution] (in Spanish). Buenos Aires: Kapelusz. 1938. OCLC 651249683.
- "Alas en libertad: Cuento patriótico para los niños" [Wings in Freedom: Patriotic Story for Children]. El Monitor de la Educación Común (in Spanish). 60 (825). 1941.
- Juguemos en el bosque [Let's Play in the Forest] (in Spanish). Buenos Aires: Estrada. 1948. OCLC 78936609.
- Fiesta: libro de lectura para segundo grado [Party: Reading Book for Second Grade] (in Spanish). Buenos Aires: Kapelusz. 1957. OCLC 1037562672.
- La lengua viva: contribución experimental a la enseñanza de la lectura [The Living Language: Experimental Contribution to the Teaching of Reading] (in Spanish). Buenos Aires: Kapelusz. 1959. ISBN 9789501369304. OCLC 641440966.
- El árbol que canta: libro de lectura para tercer grado [The Singing Tree: Reading Book for Third Grade] (in Spanish). Buenos Aires: Kapelusz. 1967. ISBN 9789501300130. OCLC 20206547.
- Reloj de sol: libro de lectura para cuarto grado [Sundial: Reading Book for Fourth Grade] (in Spanish). Buenos Aires: Kapelusz. 1967. ISBN 9789501300178. OCLC 5233083.
- El jardín de infantes: contribución experimental [Kindergarten: Experimental Contribution] (in Spanish). Buenos Aires: Kapelusz. 1969. ISBN 9789501369281. OCLC 5730236.
- Guaquimina: crónica de una aventura temeraria [Guaquimina: Chronicle of a Reckless Adventure] (in Spanish). Buenos Aires: Guadalupe. 1973. OCLC 1869041.
- Salotti, Martha A.; Loréfice de Passalia, Kitty (1974). Un viaje a la luna: y otros cuentos [A Trip to the Moon and Other Stories] (in Spanish). Buenos Aires: Guadalupe. ISBN 9789505000173. OCLC 3982300.
- El patito coletón: 50 cuentos para Jardín de Infantes [The Burlap Duckling: 50 Stories for Kindergarten] (in Spanish). Buenos Aires: Guadalupe. 1975. ISBN 9789505001743. OCLC 3992459.
