= List of California bouldering sites =

This List of California bouldering sites, includes locations within the state of California, United States, that are known for the rock climbing style of bouldering.

== List of sites ==
Name	Nearest city	County	Coordinates	Comments
Bishop	Bishop	Inyo	37°21′49″N 117°23′42″W	Numerous locations with over 2000 boulder problems.
Mount Rubidoux	Riverside	Riverside	33°59′02″N 117°23′35″W	A good site for beginners to practice a large variety of boulder problems and top-rope routes.
Bernasconi Ridge	Perris	Riverside	33°50′47″N 117°09′16″W	The Bernasconi Wall provides a quality top-roping opportunity.
Deer Creek Park	Rocklin	Placer	38°47′13″N 121°14′22″W	East of Sacramento, just a few minutes from I-80 on the side of Pacific street in the town of Rocklin, is an old granite quarry called Deer Creek Park. It sports about 50 fun and challenging vertical to slightly overhanging problems. A small grove of trees gives shade in the summer and clean flat landings with pieces of carpet straight out of the old school keep the feet dry in between tries. The granite from this quarry was used to build the State Capitol as well as parts of the Central Pacific Railway. About 10-20 good lines from VB to V-hard are concentrated into the main area with more on the surrounding boulders. Bouldering and even a little toprope climbing has been enjoyed here since at least the 1970s.
Santee Boulders	Santee	San Diego	32°50′48″N 117°01′17″W	"Easy access makes Santee Boulders a popular after work hangout. While several rocks are tall enough so that toproping is recommended (bolts on top), most of the climbing in this compact area requires only shoes and chalk bag. Over 100 problems are crammed onto 30 or so granite boulders. Thin, crimpy face climbing, and difficult mantles dominate the climbing at Santee, so bring a good fitting pair of shoes if you want to master the many micro edge problems."
Castle Rock	Santa Cruz	Santa Cruz	37°13′50″N 122°05′44″W	"The highest concentration of boulder problems in the Bay Area is side by side with great sport and trad crags. All this combined with legitimate access from one easily located parking area makes it the most popular all around rock climbing venue in the Bay Area."
