= Bernasconi family =

Swiss-Italian family

The Bernasconi family is a Swiss Italian family from Ticino which produced numerous stuccoists, architects and sculptors active in Italy, Spain, Germany and Russia. The Lugano region also produced many other internationally successful people in these fields, often closely related with the Bernasconis, such as the Vassallis (Francesco and Giovanni) of Riva San Vitale and Giovanni Pietro Magni of Bruzella.

== Prominent members ==
- Alessandro Bernasconi (c.1660 Riva San Vitale - 1720), stuccoist. Worked in Germany. Son of Constantino.
- Antonio Bernasconi "Brascon" (c.1560 Riva San Vitale - 1614), stuccoist and sculptor. Worked in Austria. Brother of Filiberto, Giovanni Battista and Pietro.
- Antonio Bernasconi (1726 Castel San Pietro - 1805), stuccoist. Worked in Russia. Father of Giuseppe.
- Bernato Bernasconi (active 1770s-1820?), stuccoist. Worked in England.
- Boris Bernaskoni (1977 Moscow, Russia), architect.
- Carlo Antonio Bernasconi (1714 Massagno - 1767), engineer and architect. Worked in Spain.
- Federico Bernasconi (c.1760, Mendrisio?), sculptor. Worked in Russia.
- Francis Bernasconi aka Francisco (1762-1841), stuccoist. Worked in England. Son of Bartolomeo.
- George Henry Bernasconi (1842 London - 1916), artist. Worked in England. Son of George Vincent.
- George Vincent Bernasconi (1805), stuccoist. Worked in England. Nephew of Francis.
- Giovanni Battista Belli-Bernasconi (1770 Camignolo-1827 Saint Petersburg), architect. Worked in Russia.
- Giuseppe Bernasconi (1778 Saint Petersburg - 1839 Saint Petersburg), decorative painter. Worked in Russia. Son of Antonio.
- Giuseppe Bernasconi (1600 Riva San Vitale), stuccoist. Worked in Italy.
- Pietro Bernasconi (1705 Riva San Vitale - 1767), architect. Worked in Italy.
- Pietro Bernasconi (1733 Castel San Pietro - 1811), sculptor. Worked in Russia. Son of Giuseppe, brother of Antonio.
- Pietro Bernasconi (1826 Castel San Pietro - 1912), sculptor. Worked in Italy.

== Bibliography ==
Antonov, V.: ''I Bernasconi a Pietroburgo'', in "Bollettino Storico della Svizzera Italiana", Fasc. III, 1990
