= Lake Perris =

Artificial lake in California, U.S.

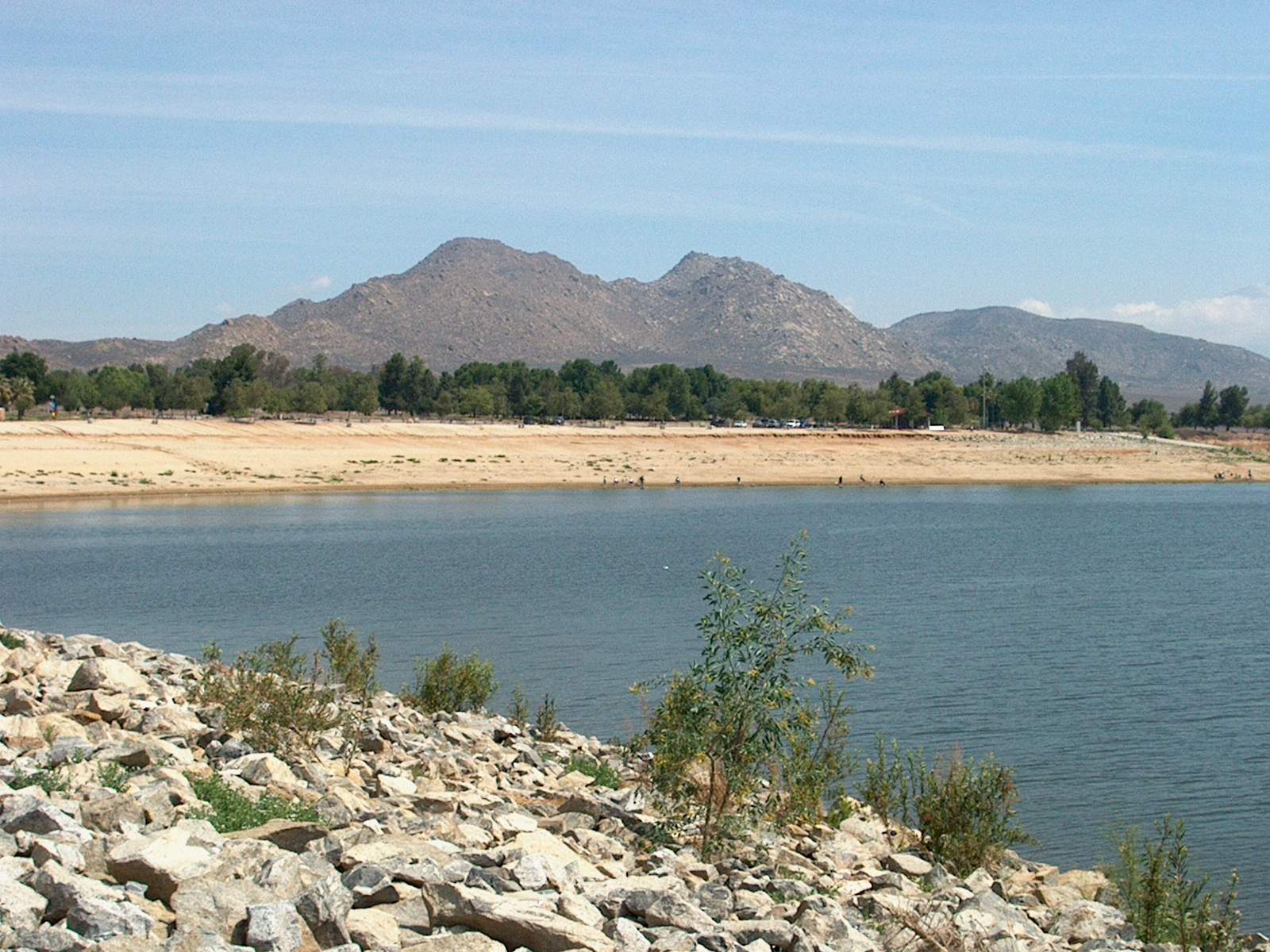
- Lake Perris State Recreation Area

- Location within California
- Location: Lake Perris State Recreation Area; Riverside County, California
- Coordinates: 33.857°N 117.175°W
- Type: Reservoir
- Basin countries: United States
- Max. depth: 100 ft (30 m)
- Surface elevation: 1,595 ft (486 m)
- Islands: Alessandro Island
- References: U.S. Geological Survey Geographic Names Information System: Perris Reservoir

Lake Perris is an artificial lake completed in 1973. It is the southern terminus of the California State Water Project, situated in a mountain-rimmed valley between Moreno Valley and Perris, in what is now the Lake Perris State Recreation Area. The park offers a variety of recreational activities. Because of this and the lake's proximity to major population centers, it is very crowded during the summer months.

The California Office of Environmental Health Hazard Assessment has issued a safe eating advisory for any fish caught in the Lake Perris due to elevated levels of mercury and PCBs.

== Ya'i Heki' Regional Indian Museum ==
The Ya'i Heki' Regional Indian Museum tells the story of the monumental State Water Project and focuses on the culture and history of the native peoples of the southern California desert region.

== Geography ==
Lake Perris is 1,560 feet (480 m) above sea level and is ringed by hills and small mountains. It impounds 131,400 acre-feet (162,100,000 m^{3}) of water behind a 2-mile (3 km) long, 128 foot (39 m) tall, chevron-shaped earthfill dam. The untended areas of Lake Perris are somewhat rocky and barren.

An artificial reef exists on the lake floor made of old tires. The reef was created to provide a habitat for fish.

The Juan Bautista de Anza National Historic Trail travels by Lake Perris.

== Flora and fauna ==
The predominant plant community, coastal sage scrub, is host to a variety of birds and wildlife. Mule deer, roadrunners, bobcats, coyotes, rabbits, quail, gopher snakes and rattlesnakes may sometimes be seen by day, though they tend to shy away from people. More frequently seen are a wide variety of lizards, rodents, water fowl, and birds of prey. Beautiful displays of wildflowers occur during the rainy season, generally November through April.

The coastal sage scrub community is predominant on the south-facing slopes of the Russell mountains and Bernasconi hills and is characterized by shrubby plants including desert encelia, brittlebush, sagebrush, Californian black sage, Californian white sage, buckwheat, and cacti. Conditions are somewhat shadier on hillsides that face north or northwest so that chaparral plants such as chamise, penstemon, and poison oak are found.

Remnants of the original perennial grasses that once flourished in this region can still be found in the flat interior of the park surrounding the lake, but the majority of plants that now make up the valley grassland community (including Russian thistle) were imported from Europe by early settlers. Riparian areas near springs and seeps, and on east and south lakes include willows, cattails, elderberry and nettles.

More than a hundred species of birds have been spotted at Lake Perris. Many are migratory, and stop at the park briefly during their travels, while others make their permanent residence here. Meadowlarks, loggerhead shrikes, roadrunners, California thrashers, quail, wrens, sparrows, hummingbirds, golden eagles, several varieties of hawks, ospreys, and even bald eagles may be seen. Many varieties of waterfowl use the lake including pintails, American wigeons, green-winged teals, mallards, shovelers, various geese, and sometimes tundra swans and pelicans. black-necked stilts, avocets, killdeer, willets, kingfishers, egrets, and herons are attracted to the water's edge.

The lake has become a hotspot for freshwater game fishing. Largemouth bass, spotted bass, bluegill, rainbow trout, channel catfish, black crappie, red ear sunfish and carp are all present in the lake. As the climate is a warm one, the California Department of Fish and Game make regular plants of rainbow trout throughout the winter months. The lake records for each of the species are noted here:

- Alabama spotted bass – 9 pounds, 6 ounces
- Florida largemouth bass – 17 pounds, 6 ounces
- Bluegill – 3 pounds, 15 ounces
- Rainbow trout – 7 pounds
- Channel catfish – 30 pounds

Largemouth bass, bluegill, rainbow trout, channel catfish, black crappie, redear sunfish tend to be the primary focus of anglers. The trout usually only bite in the cooler months after the DFG plants.

Day and night, hawks and owls are frequently seen hunting for prey. The bike trail offers an easy and convenient way to see some of the birds and other wildlife of Lake Perris. Early morning or dusk are the best times. Ranger-led hikes are conducted during the spring and early summer months.

Most plants and animals at Lake Perris are well adapted to the hot, dry environment. Chamise leaves are tiny and waxy to minimize water loss due to evaporation. Some grasses and wildflowers rush from bloom to seed in just a few short weeks and are able to complete their life cycle within the brief wet season. Kangaroo rats are so well adapted to dry environments that they seldom drink water, and manage to extract the moisture they need directly from their food.

The plants and animals of Perris Valley have changed considerably over the last two hundred years due to human activity, but its natural history can be intriguing.

== Recreation ==
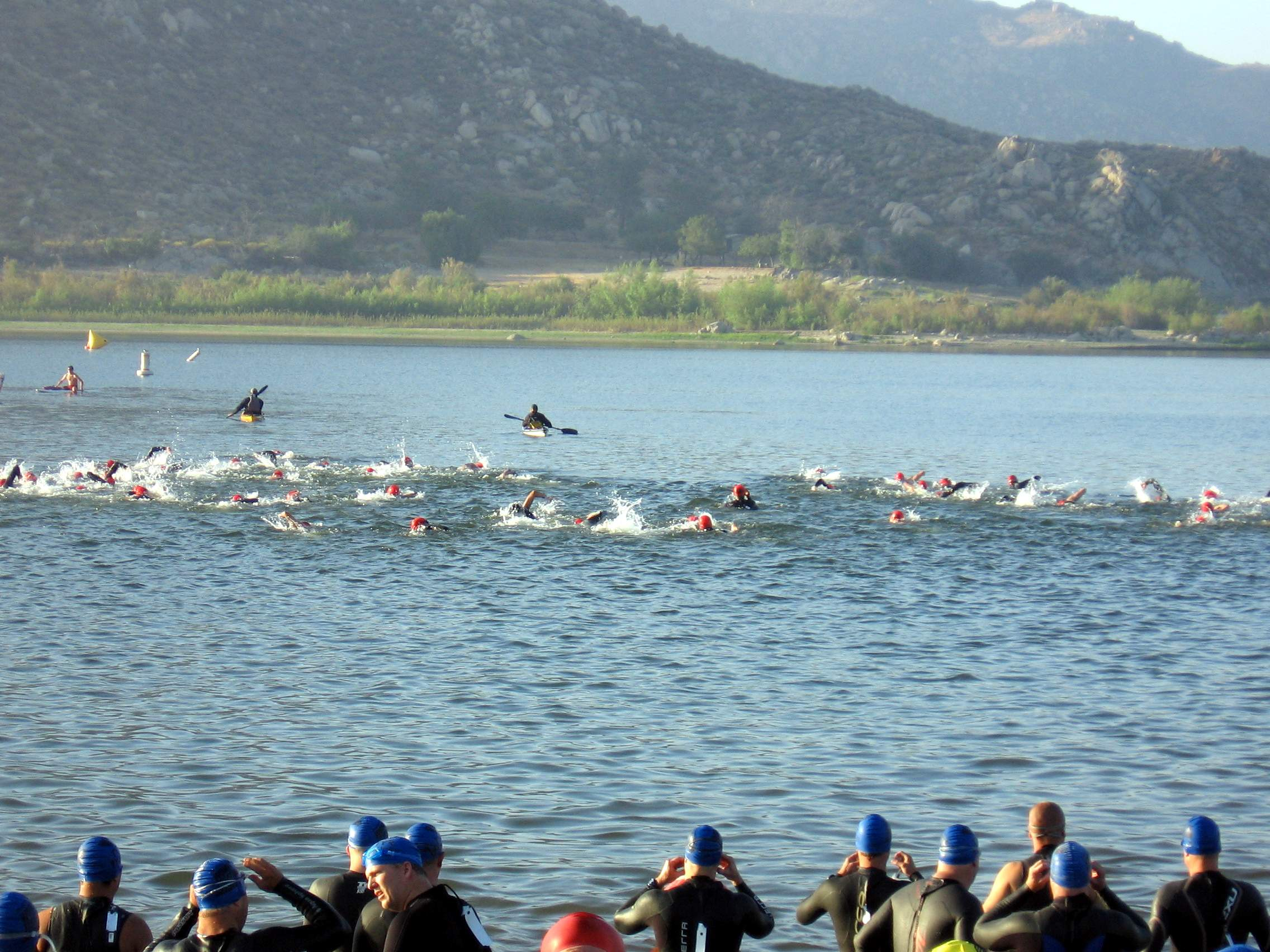
The Big Rock Triathlon at Lake Perris, 2009

There are many recreational activities allowed on, in, and around Lake Perris and in the State Recreation Park. Guided hikes are offered on the trail around the lake, and several camping sites are located near the lake side. The lake is open for boating from 6:00 am to 6:00 pm daily during the summer. Other activities include fishing, picnicking, horse-back riding, swimming (in designated areas), and rock climbing. The park also hosts the annual Big Rock Triathlon at sprint and Olympic distances. There is also a museum on the park grounds. Additionally, the city of Moreno Valley operates a recreational stretch of the Juan Bautista de Anza Trail northwest from Lake Perris for 8 miles along a DWR pipeline.

A nine-mile (14 km) paved road loops around the lake which is used to access the different areas of the lake (although the portion that runs along the top of the Perris Dam is unavailable for vehicles) and is also used by hikers, runners, and cyclists. The northwest side of the lake has beaches and swimming areas, picnic grounds with tables and grills, camp grounds including RV camp grounds, a launch ramp, a marina, a small pier, and various peninsulas. The southwest side is the Perris Dam, and allows for rock fishing. The southeast side has picnic grounds, camp grounds, and a rock climbing area. The northeast side is largely left undeveloped in order to preserve the natural flora and fauna, although it is accessible to the public. Furthermore, the paved road strays away from the lake shore thus discouraging people to disturb this section of the lake. Fishing is allowed almost anywhere. Lake Perris has one lake island called Alessandro Island, and it has picnic grounds with tables, grills, and permanent restroom facilities. The island also has a trail that goes halfway around it. The island can only be reached by boat. There are various hiking trails to be found in the park such as those that lead to Terri Peak, the highest point in the park accessible by trail at 2,569 ft. The highest point in the park is Mt. Russell at 2,704 ft., but no trail leads to the mountain or to its summit.

== Weather ==
Lake Perris and the surrounding area has hot, dry summers and cool, moist winters. Rain is almost limited to the six months between November and April. The area lies at a crossroads of weather influences. Coastal fog and smog comes from the west, while "Santa Anas"—strong, hot, dry winds—come from the deserts to the east and northeast. The average water temperature is 70 °F (21 °C); during the summer months, it is bathwater-warm and very pleasant to swim in.

== Lake Perris water withdrawal ==
For several months following July 2005, the water in Lake Perris was drawn down by about 20 percent (about 24 feet) due to safety concerns with the dam. An extensive modern study concluded that the dam could be partially breached if a 7.5 magnitude or higher earthquake were to strike in the area. Heightening the engineers' fears was that the San Jacinto Fault, easily capable of creating a 7.5 tremor, passes just a few miles north of the lake. The Perris Dam Modernization Project is split into three projects: the Perris Dam Remediation Project, the Outlet Tower Improvements Project, and the Emergency Release Facility Project.

The Perris Dam Remediation Project was completed in April 2018. The project included a strengthened dam foundation with 320,000 cubic yards (about 245,000 cubic meters) of cement deep soil mixing and 1.4 million cubic yards added to support the downstream of the dam. After completion, the dam control refilled, finishing July 2019.

The Outlet Tower Improvements Project includes the tower bridge seismic retrofit project and the Outlet Works Modification project. The aim of the project is to provide the safe release of water during normal and emergency operations and is expected to be completed in 2026. Parts of the project completed include:

- The tower gantry crane and fish screens repair was completed in 2018. Workers upgraded components of the crane controls and cleaned and repaired fish screens.
- The tower bridge retrofit project was completed in 2020 with modifications to bridge supports that provides access to the tower for operations
- The tower penstock liner repair was completed in 2021 which included in an inspection of damage to the penstock liner and repairs.

"Future work planned for the outlet tower and the downstream release and delivery facilities includes the installation of a new automated flow control gate, hydraulic controls equipment, seismic and security monitoring equipment, and the construction of a control building and an energy dissipation structure."

The Emergency Release Facility Project started in 2023 and is planned to be completed by 2026. This project will route water in the event of an earthquake away from a community of over 6,000 residents. The project will include new roadside construction, levees, bridges, and relocation of utilities.

== 2028 Summer Olympics proposal ==
The Los Angeles Olympic Bid for the 2028 Summer Olympic Games made an agreement with the Department of Parks and Recreation for the Lake to be host for competitive Canoe-Sprint and rowing competition when Los Angeles hosts the 2028 Summer Olympics. The bid committee preferred Lake Perris to Lake Casitas as Lake Perris is near a larger population base and is in close proximity to UCR for athletes’ accommodations. In February 2019 the International Rowing Federation announced that they had been asked to look at the possibility of using Long Beach Marine Stadium (the 1932 Olympic rowing venue) instead of Lake Perris. In 2022 World Rowing decided to use Long Beach Marine Stadium instead.

== See also ==
- List of dams and reservoirs in California
- List of lakes in California
