= Boris Yeltsin Presidential Center =

Coordinates: 56°50′42″N 60°35′27″E

Yeltsin Center
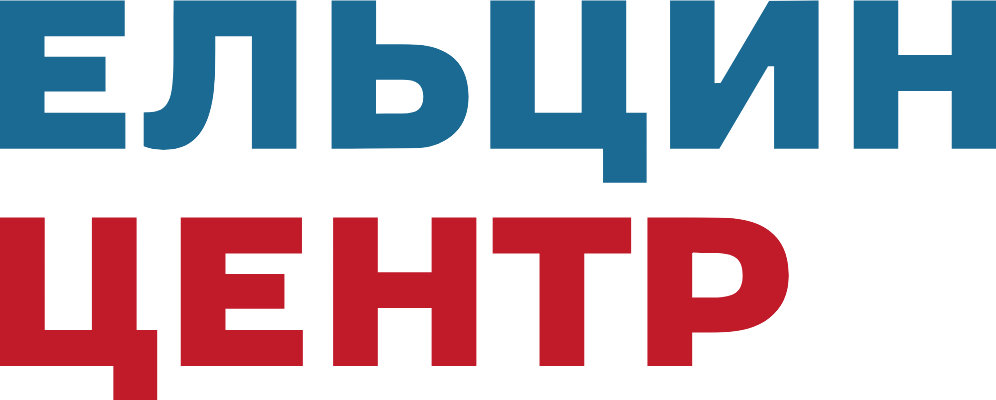

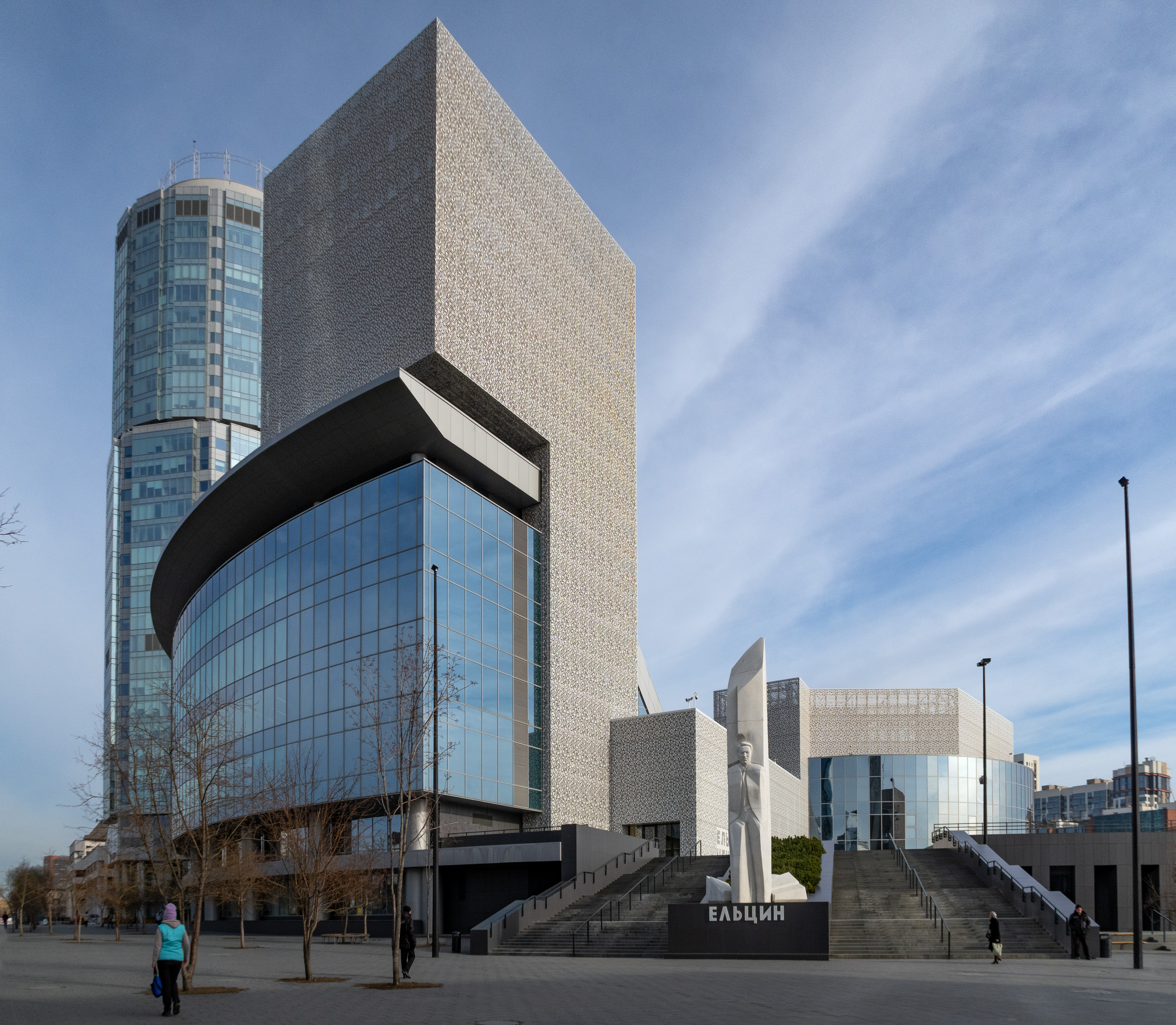
- Interactive map of the Yeltsin Center area

General information
- Location: Yekaterinburg, Sverdlovsk Oblast, Russia
- Named for: Boris Yeltsin
- Completed: November 25, 2015

Website
- Yeltsin Center

Boris Yeltsin Presidential Center, also known simply as the Yeltsin Center, is a social, cultural and educational center, which opened in Yekaterinburg in 2015. The architect of the project is Boris Bernaskoni, the founder of BERNASKONI interdisciplinary bureau that works on intersection of architecture, communication, art and industrial design.

One of the main objects of the center is Boris Yeltsin's Museum, dedicated to the contemporary political history of Russia and Boris Yeltsin, its first president.

In 2017, the Yeltsin Center was recognized as the best museum in Europe by the Council of Europe, the first of the museums in Russia.

== History and activities ==
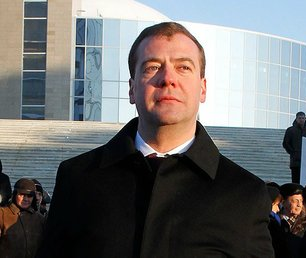
President Dmitry Medvedev at the opening of the Yeltsin Monument in February 2011

The Yeltsin Center was established in accordance with the 2008 law "On centers of historical heritage of presidents of the Russian Federation ceased to carry out its powers" for the preservation, study and public presentation of the heritage of the first President of the Russian Federation "in the context of the recent history of the Fatherland, the development of democratic institutions and the rule of law".

The Center was unveiled on 25 November 2015. The opening was attended by about 500 people including President Vladimir Putin, Prime Minister Dmitry Medvedev, Yeltsin's widow Naina, Yeltsin's daughter Tatyana, representatives of the leadership of the country, cultural figures, and others.

For the first year of operation, the museum was visited by over 250,000 people. Visitors also attended various events at the Yeltsin Center: concerts of Russian and foreign artists, the festival "Island of the '90s," "Old New Rock," the First Ural open Russian film festival, Comic-Con E-Con and others.

In December 2015 started a lecture series, "Piotrowski", which are the cultural and public figures. Lectures are held periodically in other areas of the Yeltsin Center, for example the lecture of the former Minister of Interior of Germany Gerhart Baum. By the fall of 2016 in the cinema-conference hall of the center conduct lectures in the framework of the project "Intellecture", dedicated to the technologies of the future.

The center also periodically hosts various film festivals: Russian documentary film festival "Artdocfest". The first Ural open Russian film festival, American documentary film festival, a festival of films about music and new culture "Beat Weekend", the Jewish film festival and others.

In June 2023, Russia began an investigation into the Yeltsin Center on grounds of potential "foreign agent activity".

== Boris Yeltsin's Museum ==
The museum consists of 9 rooms:

- Labyrinth of Russian History - the history of Russia from 1914 to 1987 and the history of the Yeltsin family.
- Day One: "We Are Waiting for Changes!"
- Day Two: August Coup d'État
- Day Three: Unpopular Measures
- Day Four: Birth of a Constitution
- Day Five: "Vote or Lose"
- Day Six: Presidential Marathon
- Day Seven: Farewell to the Kremlin
- The Hall of Freedom
Photos

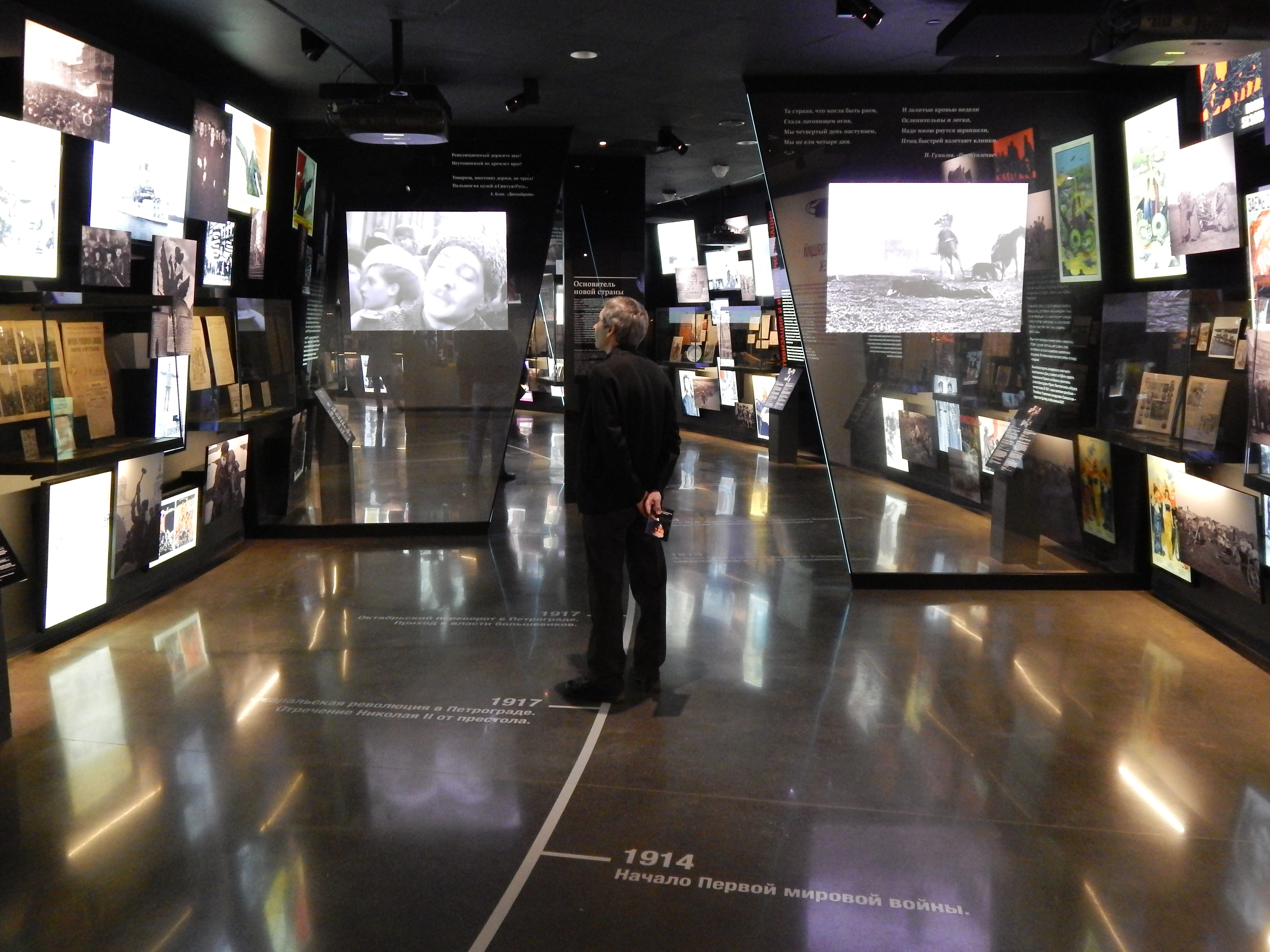
Labyrinth of Russian History

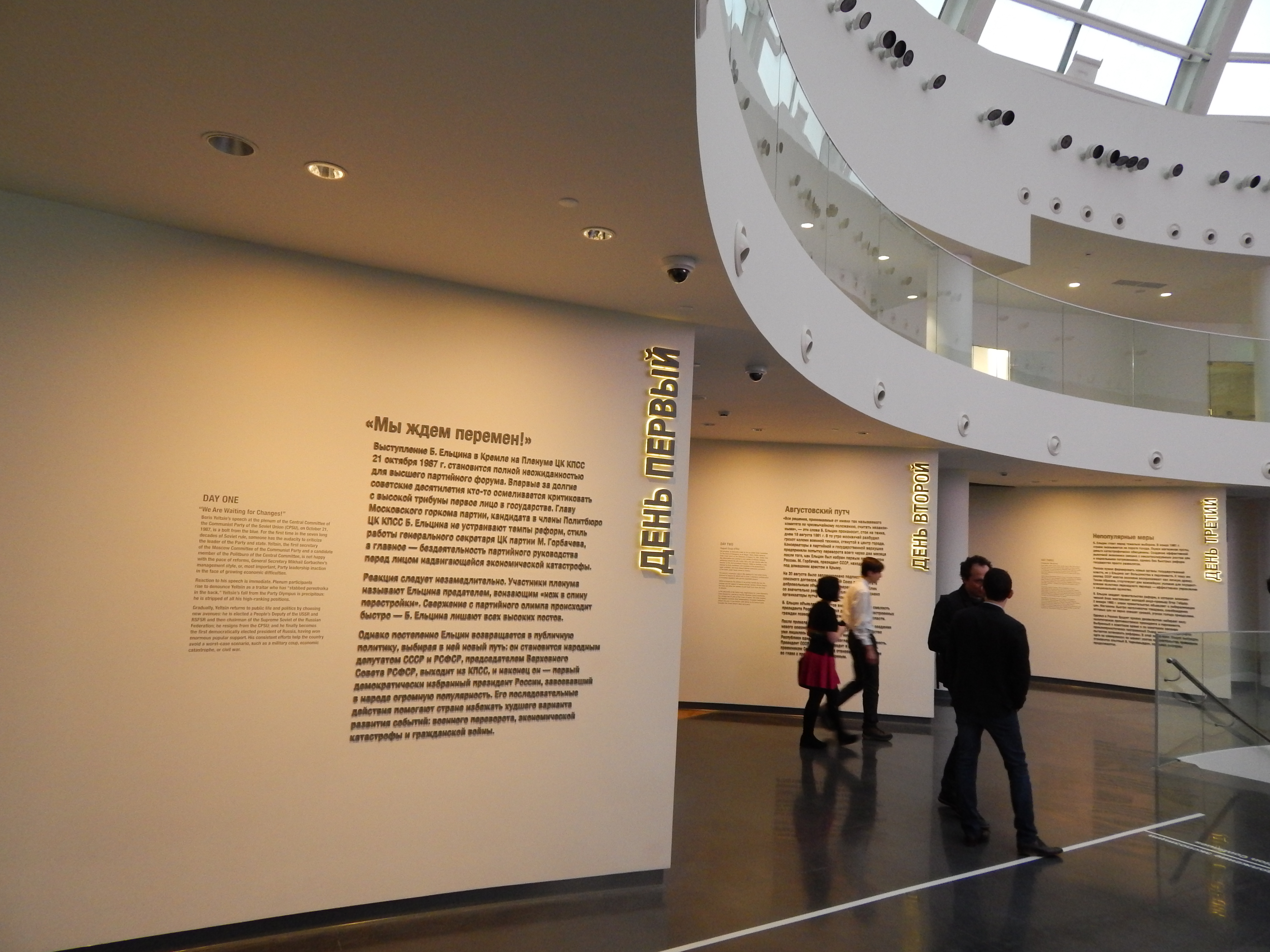
Main hall of the museum

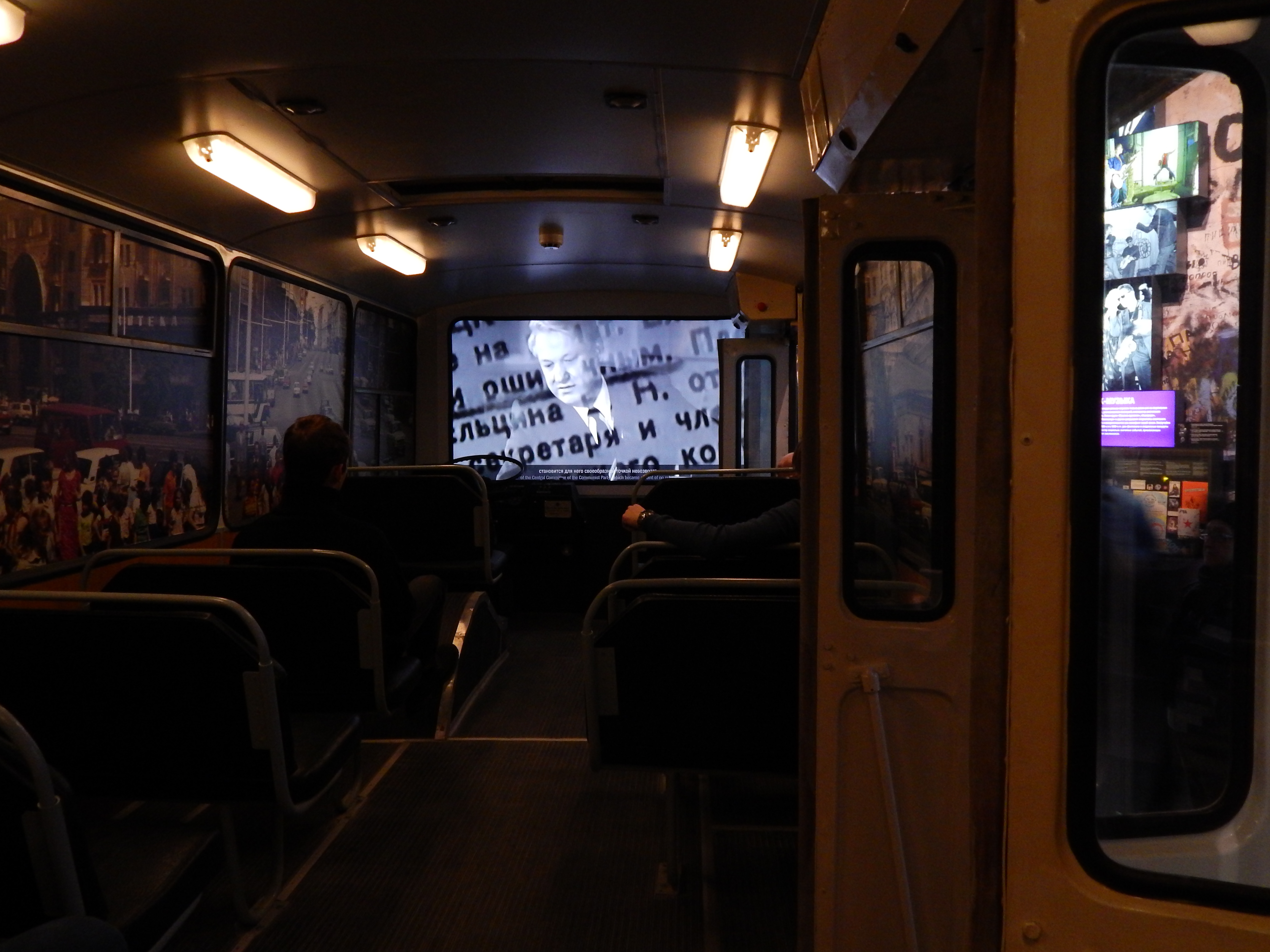
Hall "Day One: "We Are Waiting for Changes!""

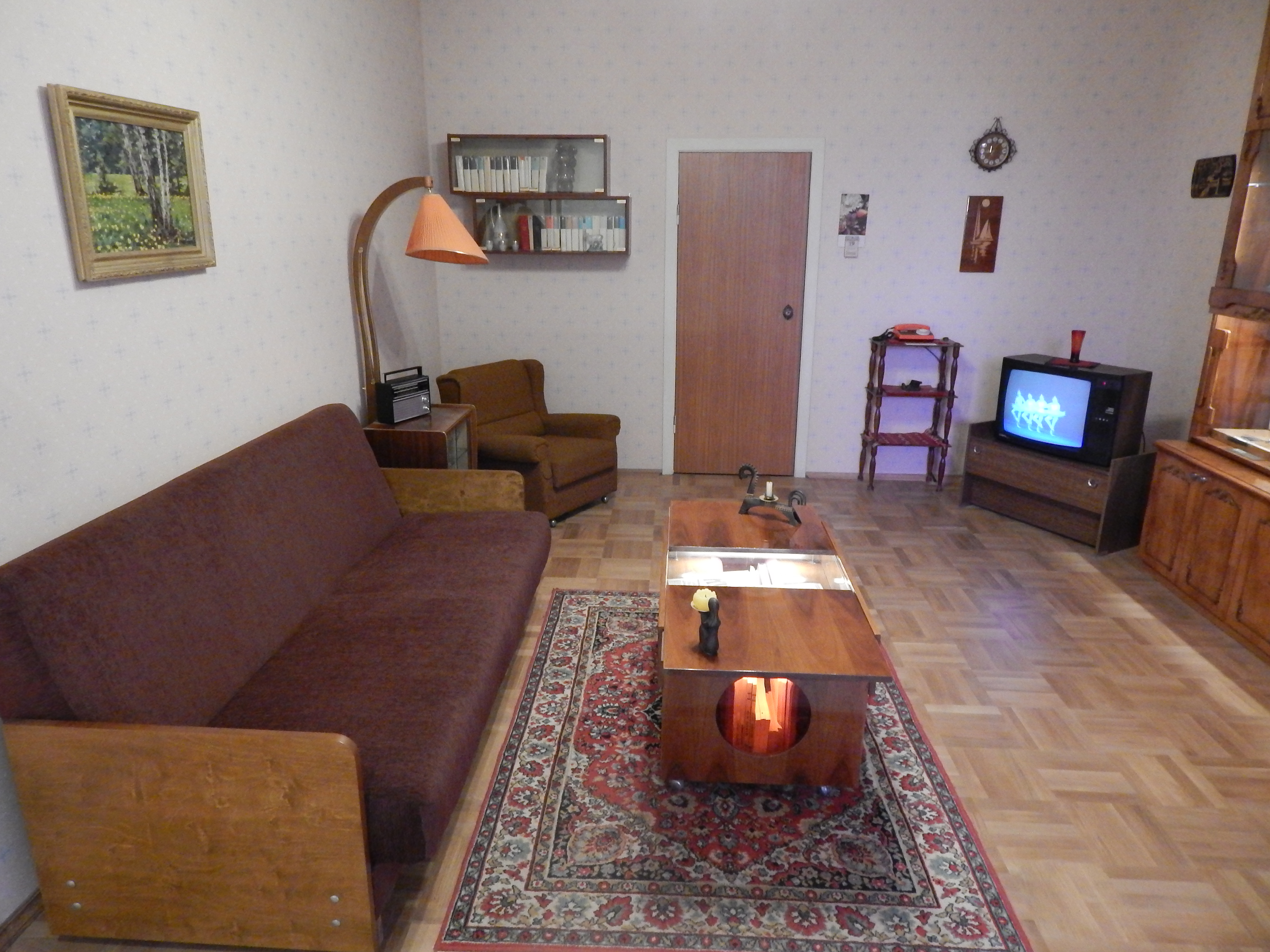
Hall "Day Two: August Coup d'État"

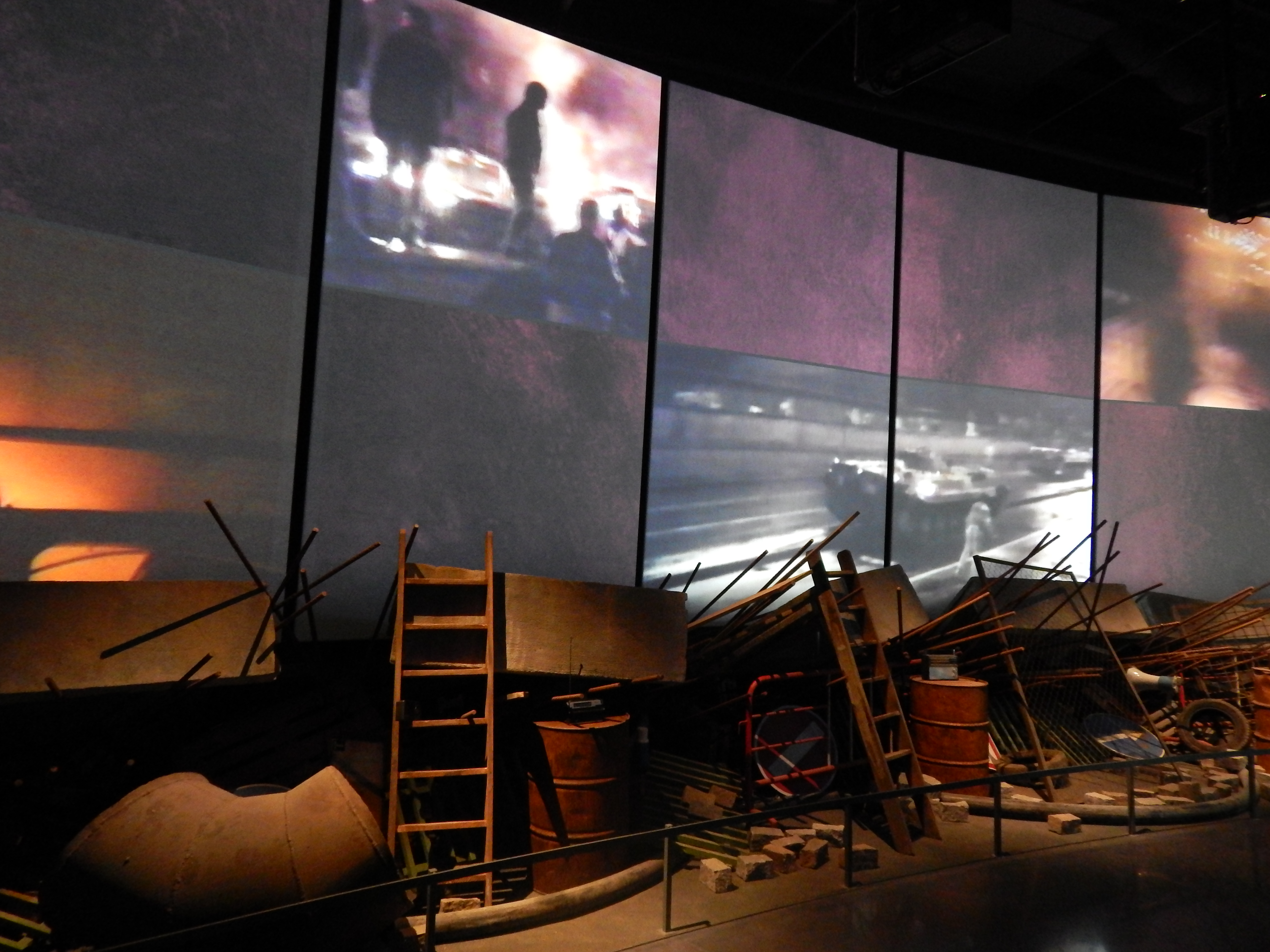
Hall "Day Two: August Coup d'État"

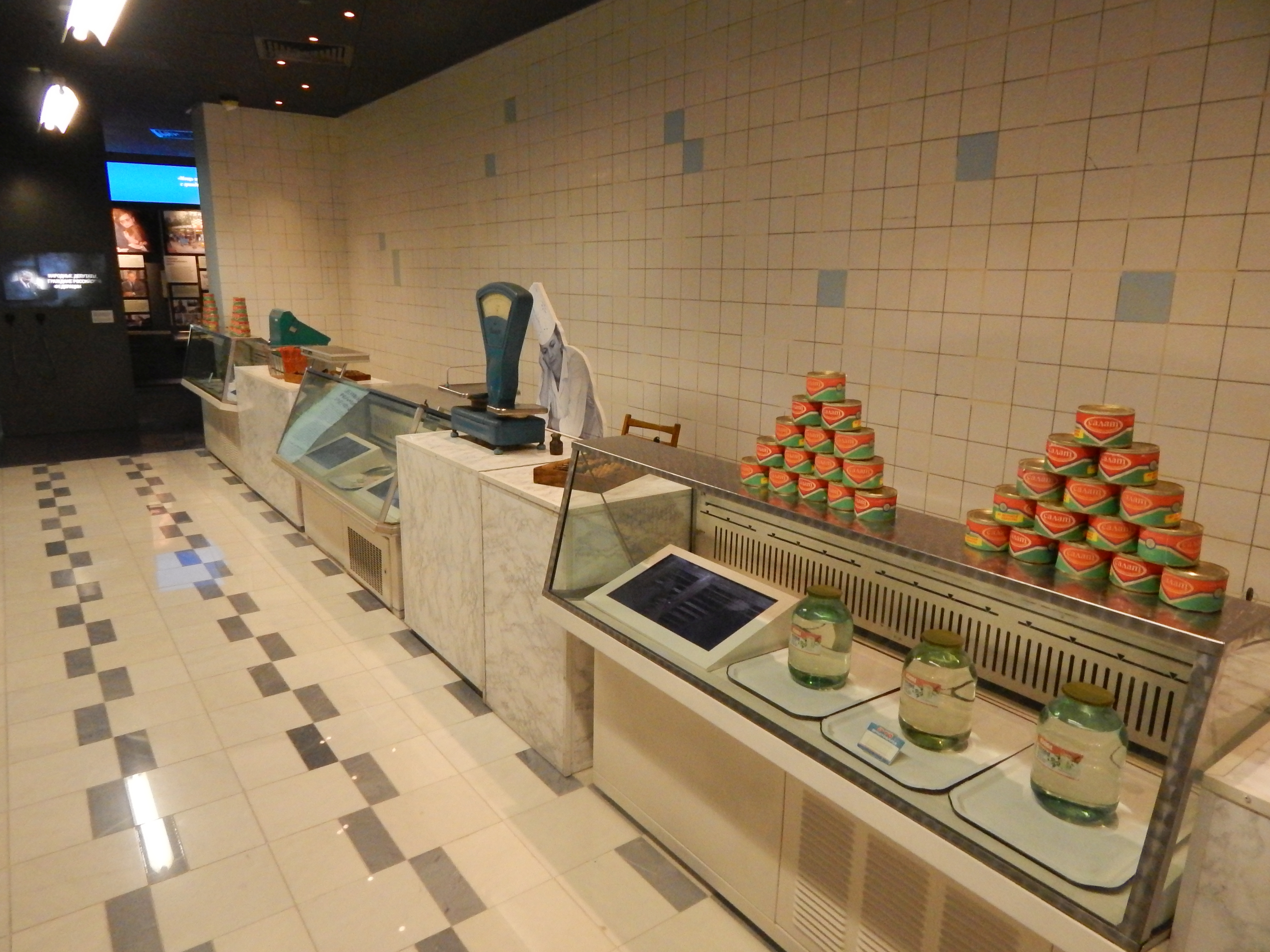
Hall "Day Three: Unpopular Measures"

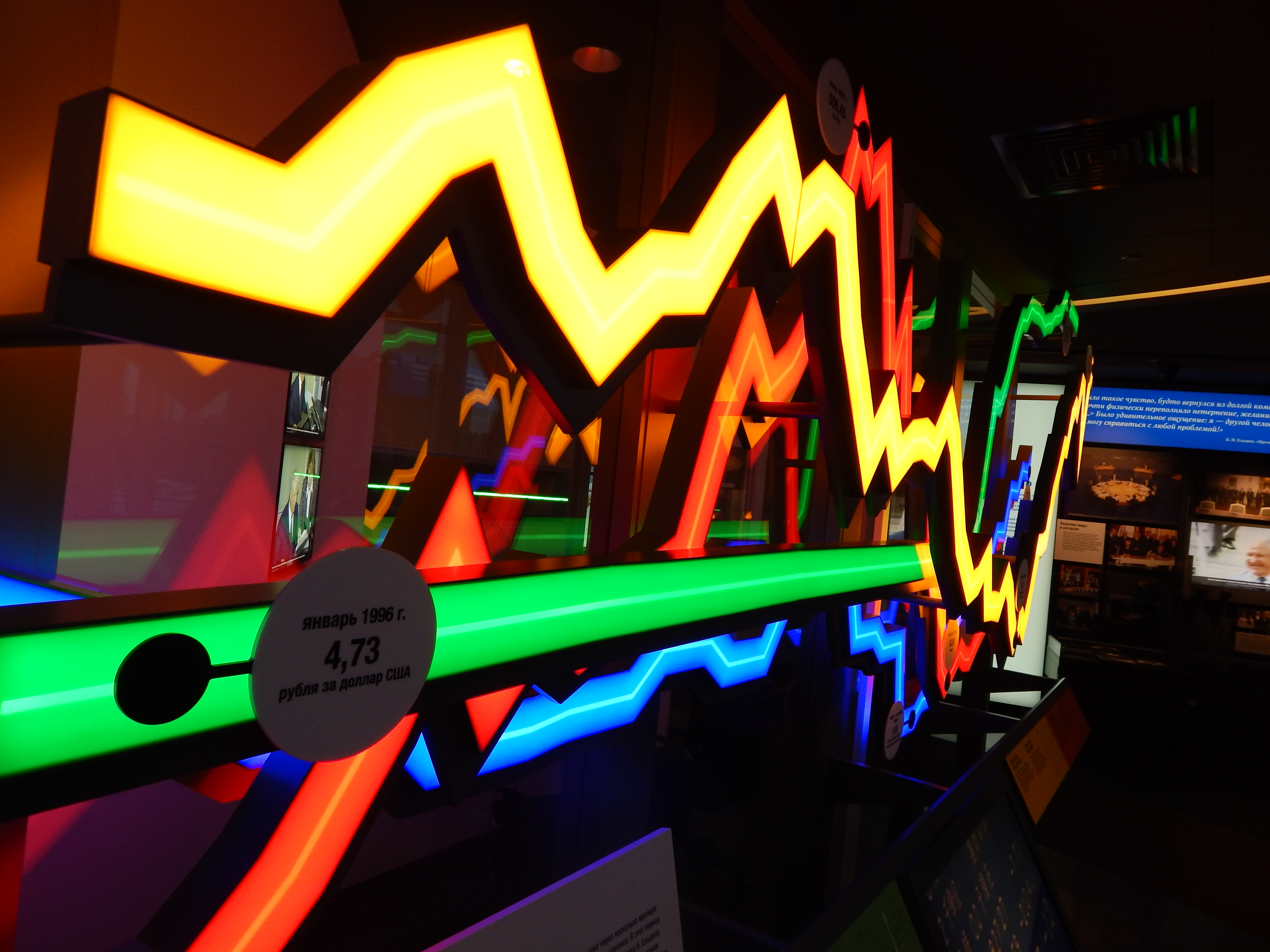
Hall "Day Six: Presidential Marathon"

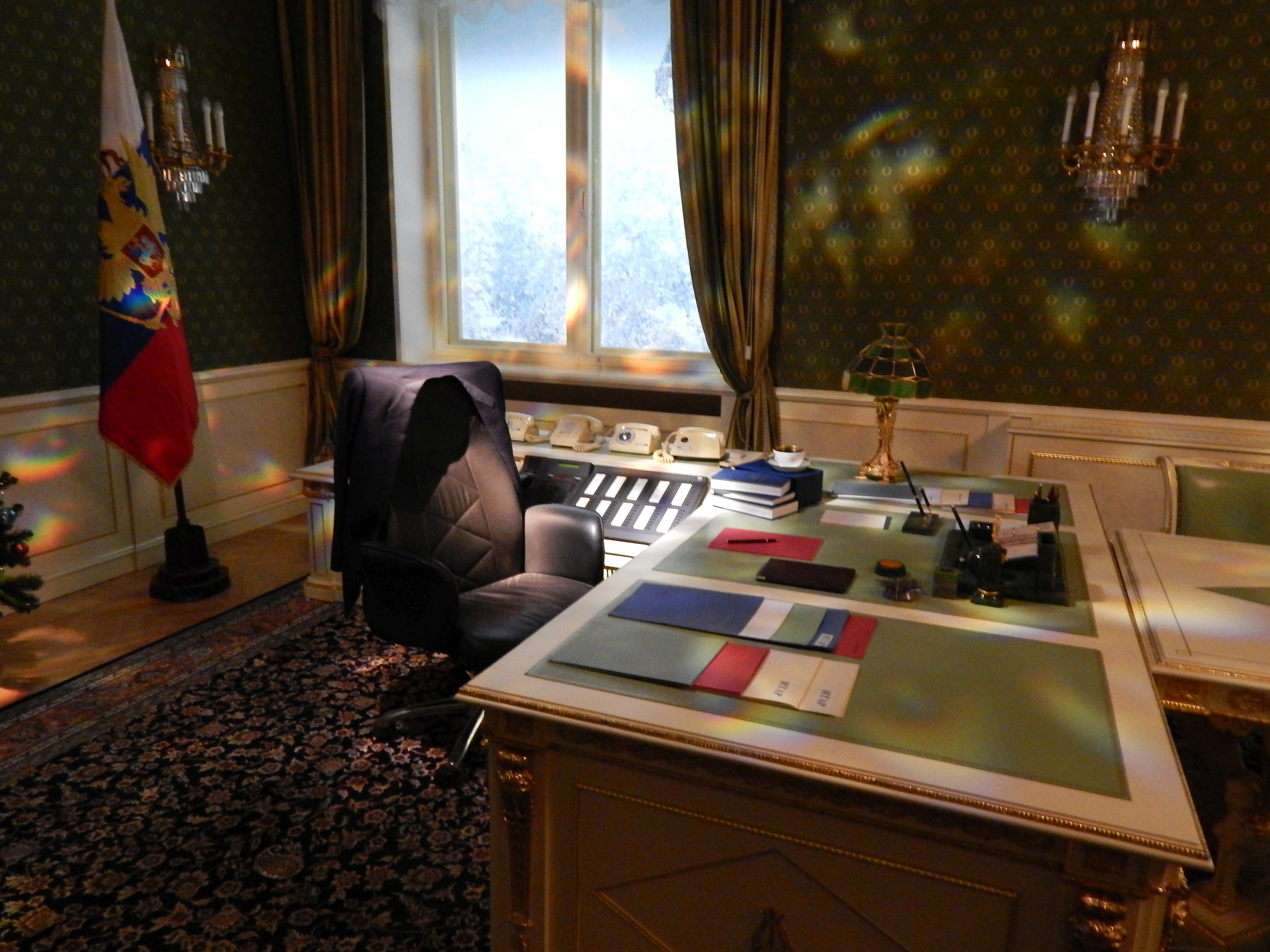
Hall "Day Seven: Farewell to the Kremlin"

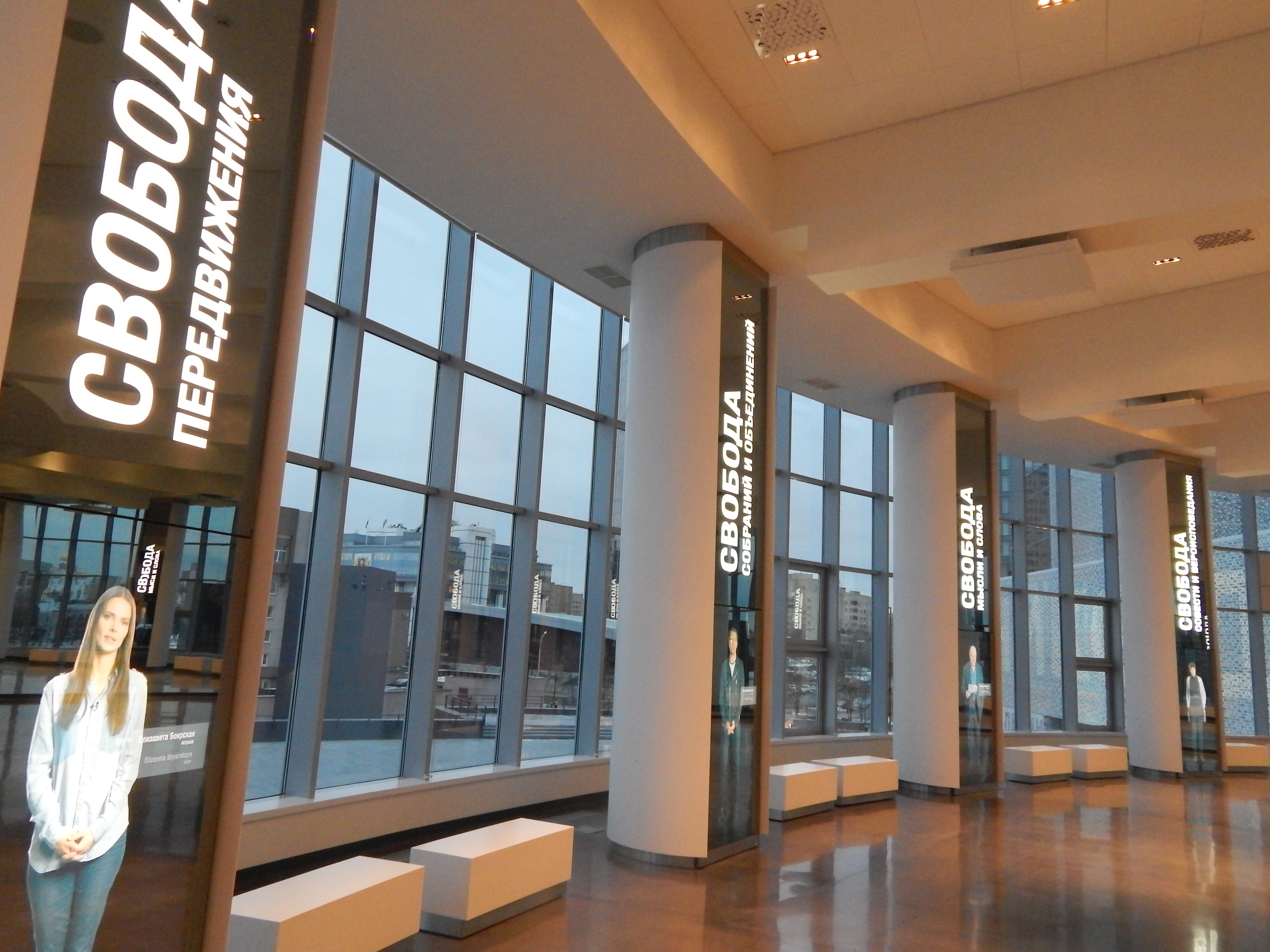
The Hall of Freedom

== Public reaction ==
The Yeltsin Center has many times been criticized for "distortion of historical events" and "propaganda." Russian film director Nikita Mikhalkov accused the Center of deliberate manipulation of history and destruction of the consciousness of the people. The Yeltsin Center is accused by representatives of various organizations (e.g. the National Liberation Movement) of the distortion of information about events during the administration of Boris Yeltsin. The public has held several protests in front of the building, demanding the closure of the Center. In January 2018, Pavel Grudinin, presidential candidate from the Communist Party, proposed to close the Yeltsin Center and to give the building to a children's educational club.

== Events ==
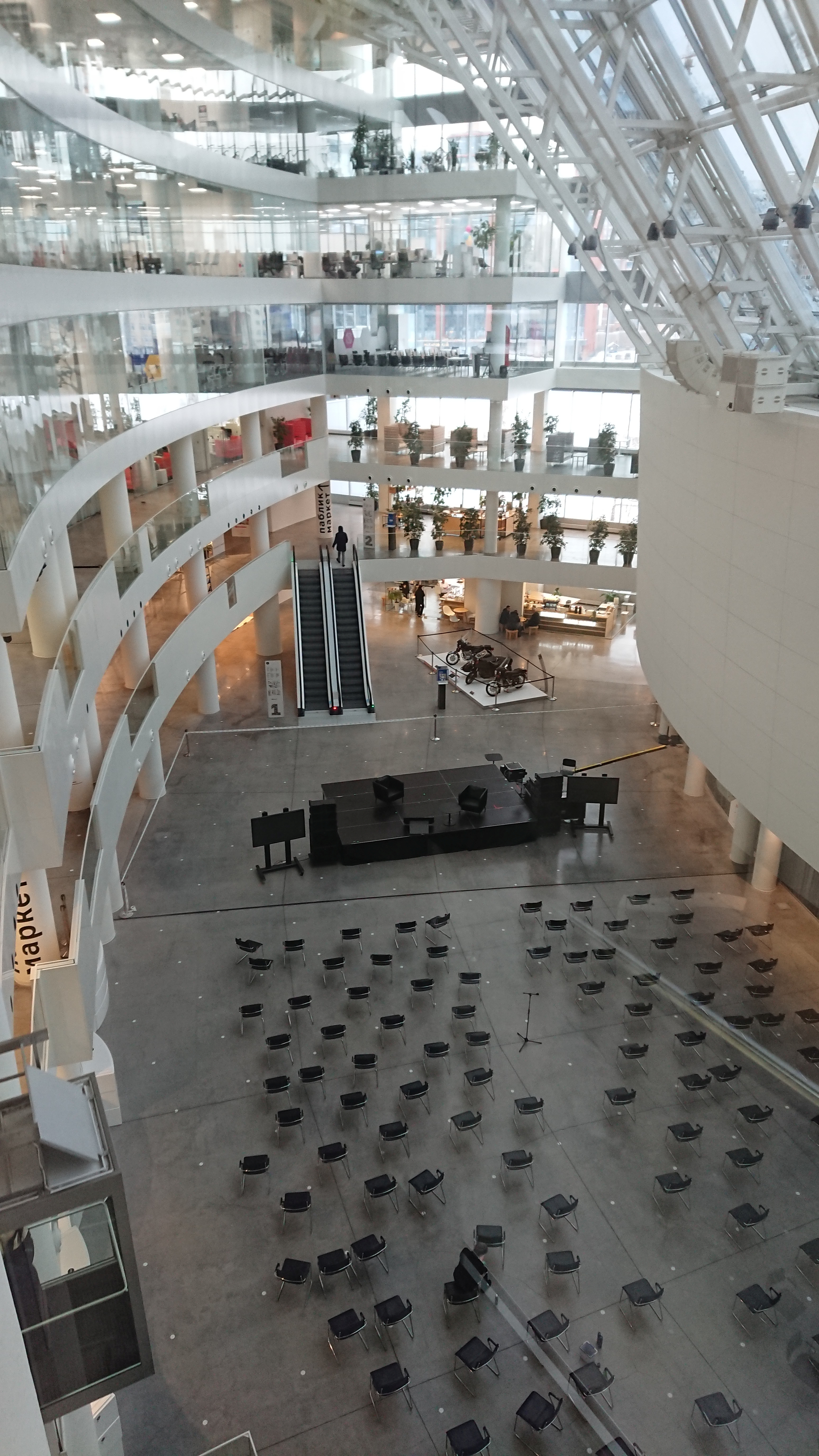
Interior

The complex has hosted events such as the Ekaterinburg Jewish Film Festival.
