= Bernasconi Institute =

Architecturally-significant primary school in Buenos Aires

Coordinates: 34°38′03″S 58°24′07″W

Location
- Parque Patricios, Buenos Aires; Argentina

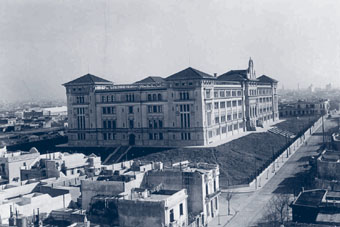
The Bernasconi Institute (1929)

The Bernasconi Institute is an architecturally-significant primary school in the Parque Patricios section of Buenos Aires, Argentina. It sits on an eight-hectare (20 acre) property in the city's southside.

== History ==
The property became the site of a homemade museum in 1866, when 14-year-old Francisco Moreno and his father classified and mounted their extensive collection of fossils and artifacts, gathered in excursions.

Following his landmark exploration of Patagonia during the 1870s and 1880s, Moreno established a charitable school at the estate. This soon became a magnet for the largely underprivileged children of the Nueva Pompeya area. He sold the property to Swiss Italian shoe manufacturer Félix Bernasconi, who included the school in his will. Bernasconi's death in 1914 was followed by lobbying for federal contributions to the project by Moreno, who leveraged the prestige he earned in his role in the Boundary treaty of 1881 between Chile and Argentina and as Assistant Director of the National Education Council to secure funding.

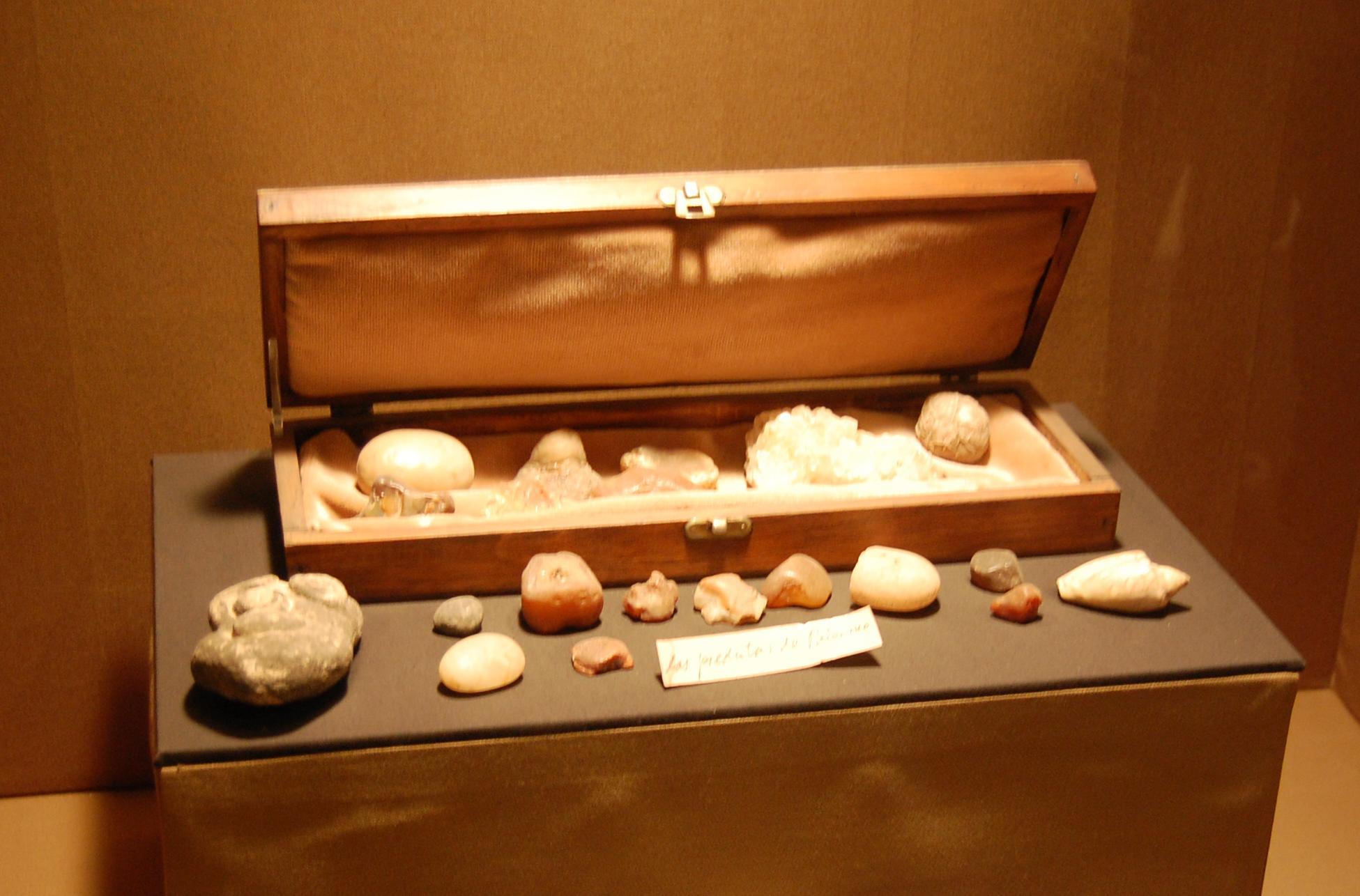
A display of part of explorer and educator Francisco Moreno's vast collections – the basis for the institute's creation

Passed the Argentine Congress in 1918, Law 1420 provided the needed appropriations, and on 26 September 1921, the cornerstone was laid in a ceremony led by President Hipólito Yrigoyen. Designed by local architect Juan Waldrorp, the eclectic, Italianate-influenced building was the largest school built in Buenos Aires to that point, and measured 140 m (460 ft) in length. The school opened in April 1929.

Heading an establishment which initially included separate boys' and girls' schools, its first director, Rosario Vera Peñaloza (1873–1950), created the Argentine Primary School Museum, which includes an antiquarian library, landscape art exhibits and botanical gardens. She and one of her successors, Martha Salotti (1899–1980) were recognized during the late 1990s when two streets in the new, Puerto Madero district were named in their honor.

== Design ==
The Bernasconi Institute featured a carillon tower, two, 1,200 m^{2} (13,000 ft^{2}) patios, two heated indoor pools, an auditorium seating 370. It included archaeological and natural science museums – the Museo Geográfico Dr. Juan B. Terán and the Museo de Ciencias Naturales Dr. Ángel Gallardo – created largely with exhibits drawn from Moreno's vast collections (housed mainly in the La Plata Museum).

== Enrollment ==
Remaining among the largest in Buenos Aires, the institute's four primary schools enroll around 3,600 students yearly, and its kindergarten, around 580, as well as an adult education facility.

== References and external links ==
- Buenos Aires.gov: Instituto Bernasconi (in Spanish)
