= Bernasconi Hills =

Mountain range in Riverside County, California, U.S.

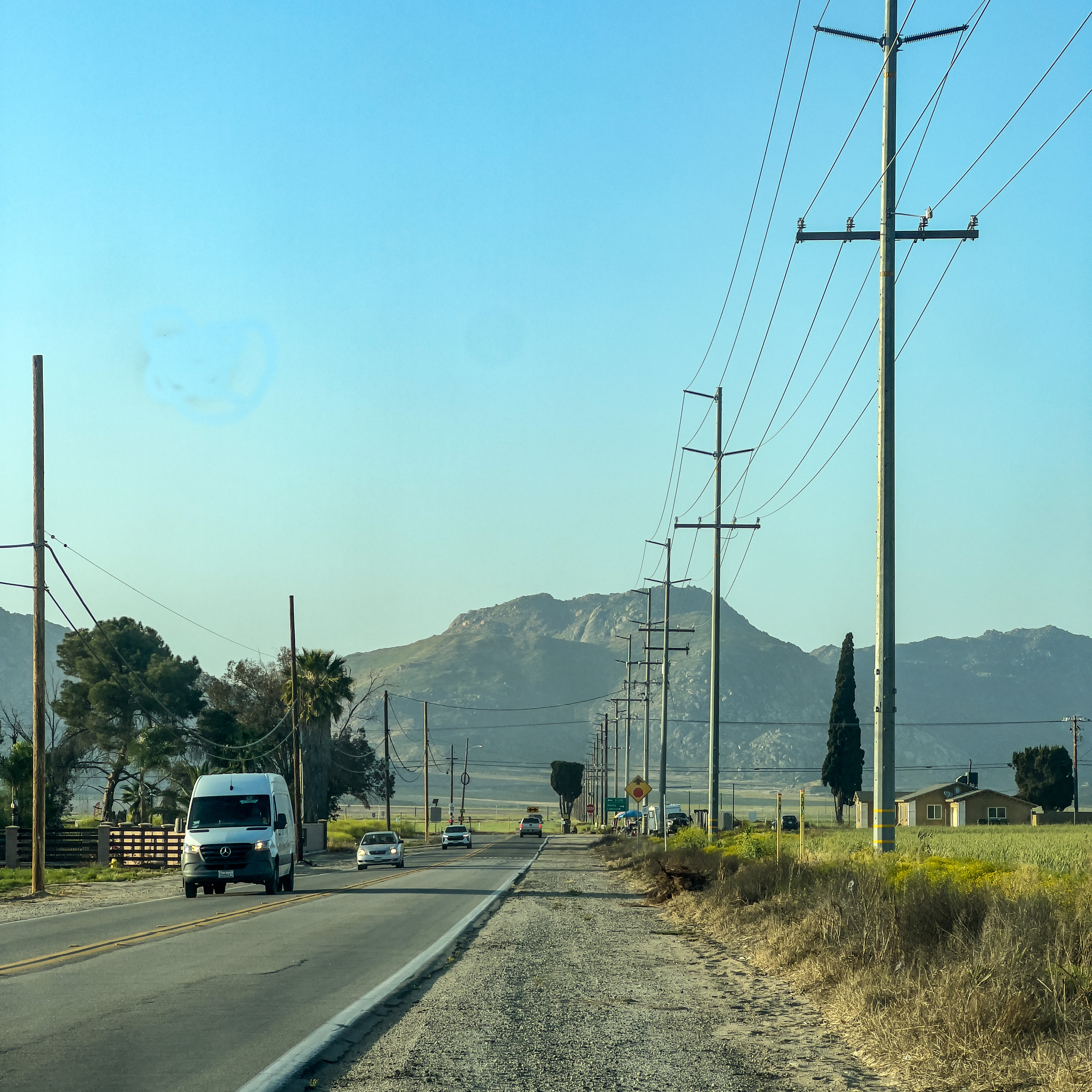
- Bernasconi Hills viewed from the south in Nuevo, California by Menifee Road

Highest point
- Elevation: 776 m (2,546 ft)

Geography
- Location within California
- Country: United States
- State: California
- Region: Peninsular Ranges
- District: Riverside County
- Range coordinates: 33°50′47.066″N 117°9′16.121″W
- Topo map: USGS Perris

The Bernasconi Hills are a low mountain range of the Peninsular Ranges, located in Riverside County, California, United States.

== Location ==
The range forms the eastern flank of the Lake Perris reservoir. Bernasconi Pass separates the range into two parts: the Bernasconi Hills North and the Bernasconi Hills South. A monument in the pass recognizes that Juan Bautista de Anza and his expedition, the first Europeans to visit the area, traveled through the pass in March 1774. With the damming and formation of Lake Perris in 1973, the western side of the pass was flooded, but the pass can still be used to access Bernasconi Beach and Bernasconi Cove on the southeast end of the lake.

Parts of the range are within the Lake Perris State Recreation Area. The rocky terrain is a recognized site for the sport of bouldering. Enthusiasts of the sport refer to the area as the Bernasconi Ridge.

== Bernardo Bernasconi ==
The hills and the pass were named for Bernardo Bernasconi (1839-1923), a native of Switzerland, who purchased 284 acres (1.15 km^{2}) of land around the hills from Joseph Wolfskill and established a sheep ranch named Sulpher Springs Ranch.

== See also ==
- List of California bouldering sites
- Media related to Bernasconi Hills at Wikimedia Commons
