= Giuseppe Bernasconi =

Russian painter

Giuseppe Bernasconi (Iosif Ivanovich Bernaskoni; Russian: Джузеппе/Иосиф Иванович Бернаскони; 1778 – 18 March 1839) was a Russian decorative painter of Swiss-Italian origins. He worked on decorations in many palaces and other buildings in and around Saint Petersburg.

== Biography ==
Giuseppe Bernasconi was born in 1778 (other sources give the date as 1796) in Saint Petersburg, in the family of Antonio Bernasconi, who had come to work as a stuccoist in the Russian capital from Castel San Pietro, a settlement near Lugano in Switzerland’s Italian-speaking Ticino canton. The area, and the Bernasconi family in particular, had produced numerous artists and architects, active across Europe, in England, Spain, Italy and Germany, as well as several distant cousins who had also come to work in Russia.

Bernasconi trained in Italy and came to the Russian capital Saint Petersburg in 1820, where he was engaged to redorate the interiors of the Winter Palace after damages caused in a fire. He executed the work in a new, more rigorous, classical style than before. In 1825, having impressed Emperor Alexander I, he was made decorative painter to the Imperial court, and granted the sum of 3,000 rubles.

The accession of Nicholas I saw marked reduction in expenditure, and Bernasconi was reduced to near poverty and compelled to seek official recognition from the Russian Imperial Academy of Arts in order to earn a living as a drawing teacher. On presenting his portfolio to the Academy, with the support of his associate Stasov, he was made professor of interior decoration and painting in 1833, with an annual salary of 1,500 rubles.

He died 18 March 1839 in Saint Petersburg. Bernasconi never married, and was buried by his friend Andrea Staffieri of Bioggio. His books and drawings were then auctioned off.

== Works ==
- At the Winter Palace, Saint Petersburg. Classical interiors.
- At the Catherine Palace, Tsarskoye Selo. 80 medallions depicting mythological figures, painted decoration of the study of Princess Yelizaveta Alekseyevna, painted flowers on the doors and furniture of Empress Maria Feodorovna's private chambers (1825).
- At the Pavlovsk Palace. Decorated the library built by Carlo Rossi. Paid 3,000 rubles.
- Interiors of the Military Medical Academy, Saint Petersburg. Painted panels and decorated the main rooms, particularly the conference hall.
- Paintings in the Church of Saint Nicholas the Miracle-Worker at the Saint Nicholas Hospital, Saint Petersburg.

== Bibliography ==
Antonov V.: I Bernasconi a Pietroburgo, in "Bollettino Storico della Svizzera Italiana", Fasc. III, 1990
