= George Henry Bernasconi =

British painter

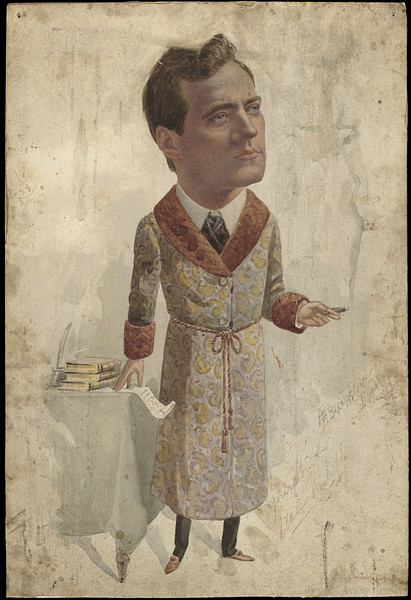
A watercolour of the actor Walter Melville by Bernasconi, circa 1910.

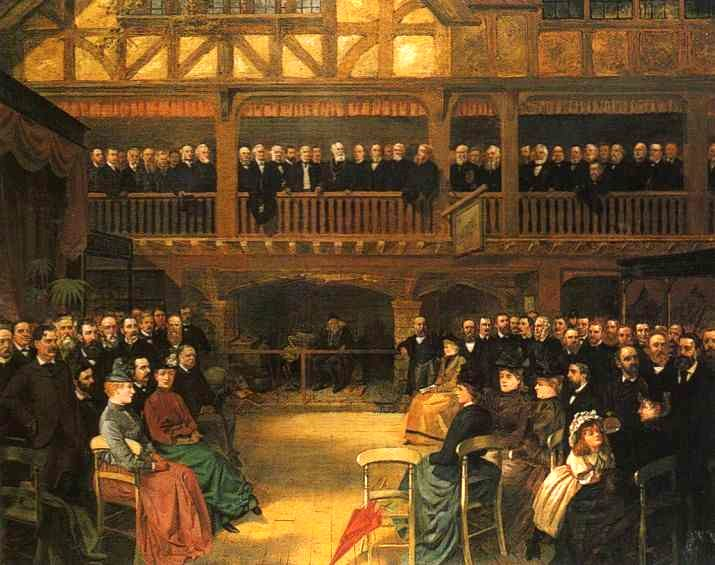
Meeting of the City of Birmingham Pharmaceuticals 1888 by George Bernasconi. Oil.

George Henry Bernasconi (c. 1842–1916) was a Birmingham artist, the son of George Vincent Bernasconi, and of the same family as Francis Bernasconi.

Bernasconi exhibited at the Royal Academy twice, in 1861 and 1863. In the 1860s he moved to the Birmingham area and he is listed in the 1871 census as an artist in watercolours. There he contributed cartoons to the long-running Birmingham journal, the Town Crier, edited by his friend Wilmot Corfield. Later, he had a business in modelling and design. In 1885 he inherited almost £7,000 from his father.

His 1884 painting Merchant Shipping Bill Banner is in the People's History Museum, Manchester.

== Personal life ==
In 1911, Bernasconi was living at 31 Breck Road in Poulton-le-Fylde, Lancashire.
