= Antonio Bernasconi (architect) =

Italian architect

Antonio Bernasconi (1710, Italy–1785, Guatemala) was an Italian archaeologist and architect working for the service of the Crown of Spain during the XVIIth century. Sometimes confused with architect Luis Bernasconi, he collaborated with the architectural reform agenda of Francesco Sabatini at several Spanish royal sites. After 1777, he supervised the building of Guatemala City after the devastating 1773 earthquake which had ravaged the previous capital city. In 1785 he explored Mayan ancient city of Palenque, providing some of the first scientific cartography of the area.

== Archaeological works ==
- Informe de don Antonio Bernasconi sobre la ciudad arruinada en la provincia de Chiapa, a 3 leguas del pueblo del Palenque, Guatemala, 13 de junio de 1785, in Real Academia de la Historia, Colección Juan Bautista Muñoz, sig. 9/4853, pp. 182–184
