= Francis Bernasconi =

English ornamental carver and plasterer

- Born: Francis Bernasconi; 1762; Kingdom of Great Britain
- Died: 1 January 1841 (aged 78–79); Bloomsbury, London U.K.
- Occupations: ornamental carver and plasterer
- Parent: Bartholomew (Bartolomeo) Bernasconi (father)
- Relatives: Bartholomew (son) and Frances (daughter); George Vincent Bernasconi (nephew)

Francis Bernasconi (1762 – 1 January 1841), aka Francisco Bernasconi, was an English ornamental carver and plasterer of Italian descent. He became one of the most successful ornamental carvers and plasterers in Georgian Britain.

== Early life ==
Francis Bernasconi was the son of Bartholomew (Bartolomeo) Bernasconi (died 1786), who hailed from a family of architects and stuccoists from the environs of Lugano, Switzerland. He is likely to have been related to the ornamental plasterer Bernardo or Bernato Bernasconi, "a poor man with a large fameley in the town of Buckingham". His more distant cousins of the same Lugano dynasty included various architects, sculptors and stuccatore active in Italy, Germany, Spain and Russia.

== Works ==
- Gothic stucco work for Cobham Hall, Kent (1800–1809)
- Stucco work in the Great Tower of Westminster Abbey (1803)
- Mouldings, angels and heraldic shields in Windsor Castle (1805)
- Interior plasterwork in Laurieston House, 51-2 Carlton Place, Glasgow (1806). In this he worked for architect Peter Nicholson. His work here was of the Neo-Classical Adam Style and he collaborated with a team of Italian craftsmen. The recent excavations at Herculaneum and Pompeii provided inspiration for the design of the figurative mouldings, reliefs and other decorative plasterwork. There are also references to classical mythology such as Castor and Pollux, Hector and Andromache, Aeneas carrying Anchises and The Temptations of Hercules. This is the finest intact Georgian house in the city and listed category A, however it is boarded up and inaccessible. There is a statue of Minerva in this house, but it is not known if this is Bernasconi's work.
- Plasterwork at Grosvenor House, London (1807). He was paid £2,097.
- 1809-11 the plasterwork of the grand staircase hall at Taymouth Castle for the Marquis of Breadalbane
- Repairs to Trinity College in Cambridge, using Roman cement to cover the east side of the great court (1810).
- Repairs to the choir screen in York Minster (1814–1818).
- Gothic ornaments at Chicksands Priory, Bedfordshire (1816).
- Carving of the canopy of the Cardinal Wolsley statue, Christ Church, Oxford (1819).
- The grand staircase in Buckingham Palace, for which he was employed by the Prince Regent to model four sculpture groups from designs by Alfred Joseph Stothard. (1820).
- Gothic decoration at Blithfield Hall (1822). The patron, Lord Bagot, described his work on the Great Hall as being "as perfect a specimen ... as has ever been executed in modern times."
- Altarpiece, Westminster Abbey (1825).

== Family ==
He had two children, a son Bartholomew and a daughter Frances, both of whom survived him. His nephew, George Vincent Bernasconi (b. 25 December 1805), was employed in Francis Bernasconi's company. George Henry Bernasconi (24 November 1841 – 1916), (son of George Vincent Bernasconi) was a successful Birmingham illustrator and photographer.

== Death ==
He died on 1 January 1841 from asthma at his home of 19 Alfred Place in Bloomsbury, London.
