= Antonio Bernasconi (stuccoist) =

Stuccoist

Antonio Bernasconi (Antonio Bernaskoni; Russian: Антонио Бернаскони; 1726–1805) was a Russian stuccoist born in Switzerland. He worked on decorations in many palaces and other buildings in and around Saint Petersburg, particularly under the architect Antonio Rinaldi.

== Biography ==
Bernasconi was born in 1726 in Castel San Pietro, a settlement near Lugano in Switzerland's Italian-speaking Ticino canton. The area, and the Bernasconi family in particular, had produced numerous artists and architects, active across Europe, in England, Spain, Italy and Germany, as well as several distant cousins who had also come to work in Russia. Antonio was a descendant of the prominent stuccoist Pietro Magno, who decorated many palaces and ecclesiastical buildings in central Germany.

Bernasconi trained under his uncle Francesco Pozzi and in 1751 went to work in Rieti, in Latium, Italy. He then followed many other Italian and Swiss-Italian artisans of the day in going to work in the Russian Empire, where he first worked on the palace of the Ukrainian Hetman Kirill Razumovsky, in a team led by the architect Antonio Rinaldi, with whom he would continue to work on several projects in and around the Russian capital Saint Petersburg. Here he was awarded a five-year contract in 1777 to decorate the state chambers at the Tsarskoye Selo palaces, specifying that he "make all the ornaments in plaster, as well as the stuccos in imitation marble for the decoration of the living areas", being paid the sum of 850 rubles and assigned five assistants.

He later worked at the Pavlovsk Palaces, but in 1785, was forced to resign from his position due to ill health occasioned by the damp conditions by the Gulf of Finland. He recommended his countryman Felice Lamoni of Muzzano for his replacement, and returned to his homeland, accompanied by his wife Elisabetta Fritz and son Giuseppe Bernasconi (born 1778). Giuseppe would later return to Saint Petersburg as an architect. Bernasconi died in 1805.

== Works ==
- Stucco work for two palaces in Ukraine belonging to Hetman Razumovsky (1760s). Worked under the Italian architect Antonio Rinaldi.
- Interior decoration at the Peterhof palace (1770s), including several compositions that have merited particular praise: "The architecture and décor of the White Banqueting Hall, restored in 1965, are marked by that harmonious clarity and elegance which distinguish the best among the Russian interiors decorated in the Classical style."
- Stucco at the Marble Palace, Saint Petersburg, under Antonio Rinaldi.
- Decoration at the Pavlovsk Palace, under the Scottish architect Charles Cameron, particularly the banqueting hall, ballroom and billiards room.
- Stucco work at the Tsarskoye Selo palace complex. Of particular note here is his internal and external marble imitation work on the garden pavilion (1785).

== Bibliography ==
Antonov V.: I Bernasconi a Pietroburgo, in "Bollettino Storico della Svizzera Italiana", Fasc. III, 1990
