= Breck Road =

Road in Lancashire, England

Coordinates: 53.852020°N 2.986905°W

- Breck Street (formerly)
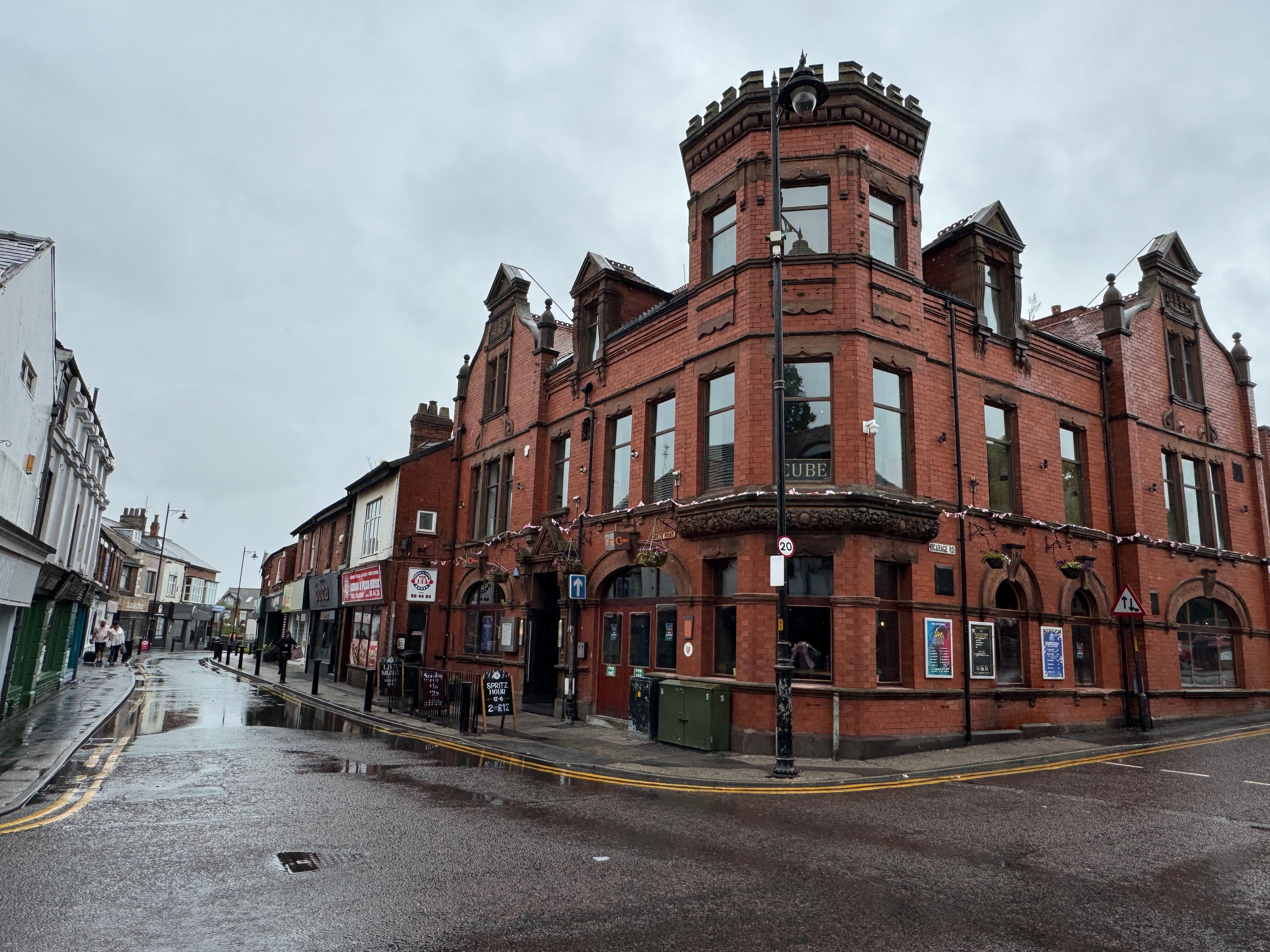
- Looking south along Breck Road (left of centre) from beside the Thatched House at the junction of Ball Street (left) and Vicarage Road (right) in 2024
- Interactive map of Breck Road
- Part of: A588
- Length: 0.79 mi (1.27 km)
- Location: Poulton-le-Fylde, Lancashire
- North end: Amounderness Way
- South end: Chapel Street, Ball Street and Vicarage Road

Breck Road (formerly Breck Street; colloquially known as The Breck) is a road in Poulton-le-Fylde, Lancashire, England. Originally known as Breck Street, it runs for about 0.79 miles (1.27 km) from Chapel Street, Ball Street and Vicarage Road in the south to Amounderness Way (the A585) in the north.

The road is one-way northbound between its Chapel Street/Ball Street/Vicarage Road junction and Victoria Road, just beyond Poulton-le-Fylde railway station.

It is part of the A588, a designation it picks up from Chapel Street. Amounderness Way eastbound inherits the A588 designation.

Sources differ as to whether Breck Street was the former name of Breck Road or Station Road. An October 1926 edition of The London Gazette lists all three streets.

== Notable landmarks ==
- 31 Breck Road (formerly the home of George Henry Bernasconi)
- Poulton-le-Fylde railway station (built in 1896)
- Wyre Civic Centre (formerly Cotton Industry Convalescent Home and the Mary MacArthur Home)

A Jubilee Arch stood in front of today's Civic Centre until 1980.

The Ship Inn once stood at today's 2 Breck Road, a space now occupied by The Cube restaurant. The Ship was popular with Fleetwood seamen, travelling labourers and locals.

The Royal Oak Hotel stood at the corner of Breck Road and Station Road between 1842 and 2018, when it was demolished. Across Breck Road stood the Railway & Station Hotel, built in 1838.

Breck House, across from today's Breck Lodge, was the home of James Sykes, a wine merchant from Liverpool. It is now a housing estate, while the public swimming pool stands on part of its former gardens.

In 1876, a chapel and presbytery, along with "elegant Gothic schools" connected thereto, were mentioned. This is St John's Chapel, at the corner of Moorland Road, which was built in 1813 and is Grade II listed.

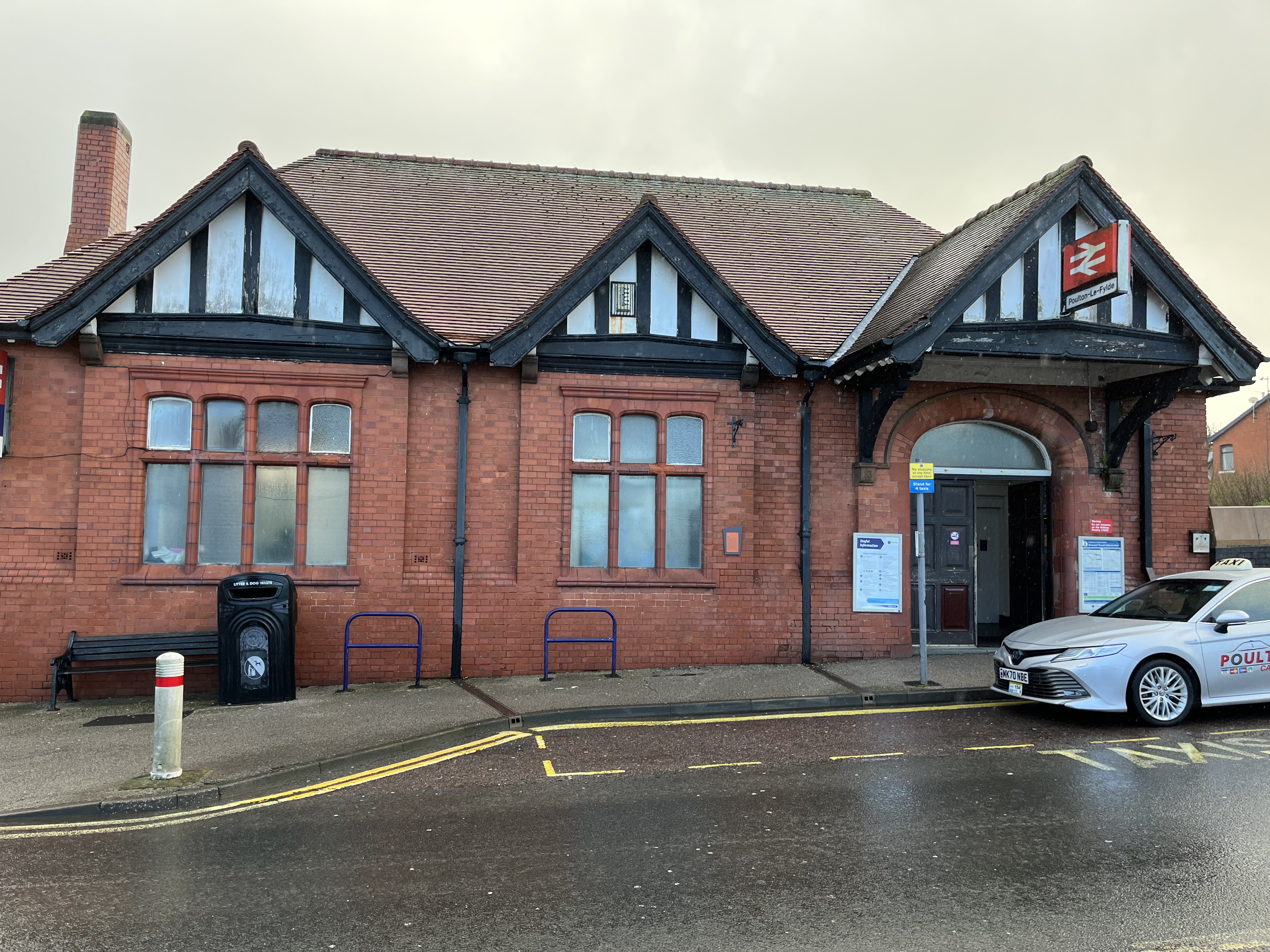
Poulton-le-Fylde railway station

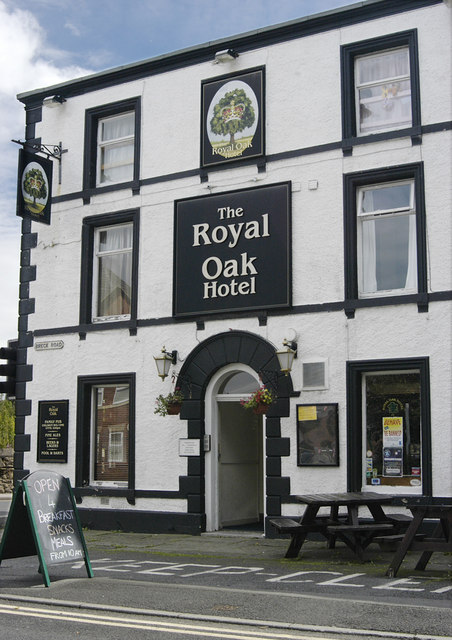
The now-demolished Royal Oak Hotel

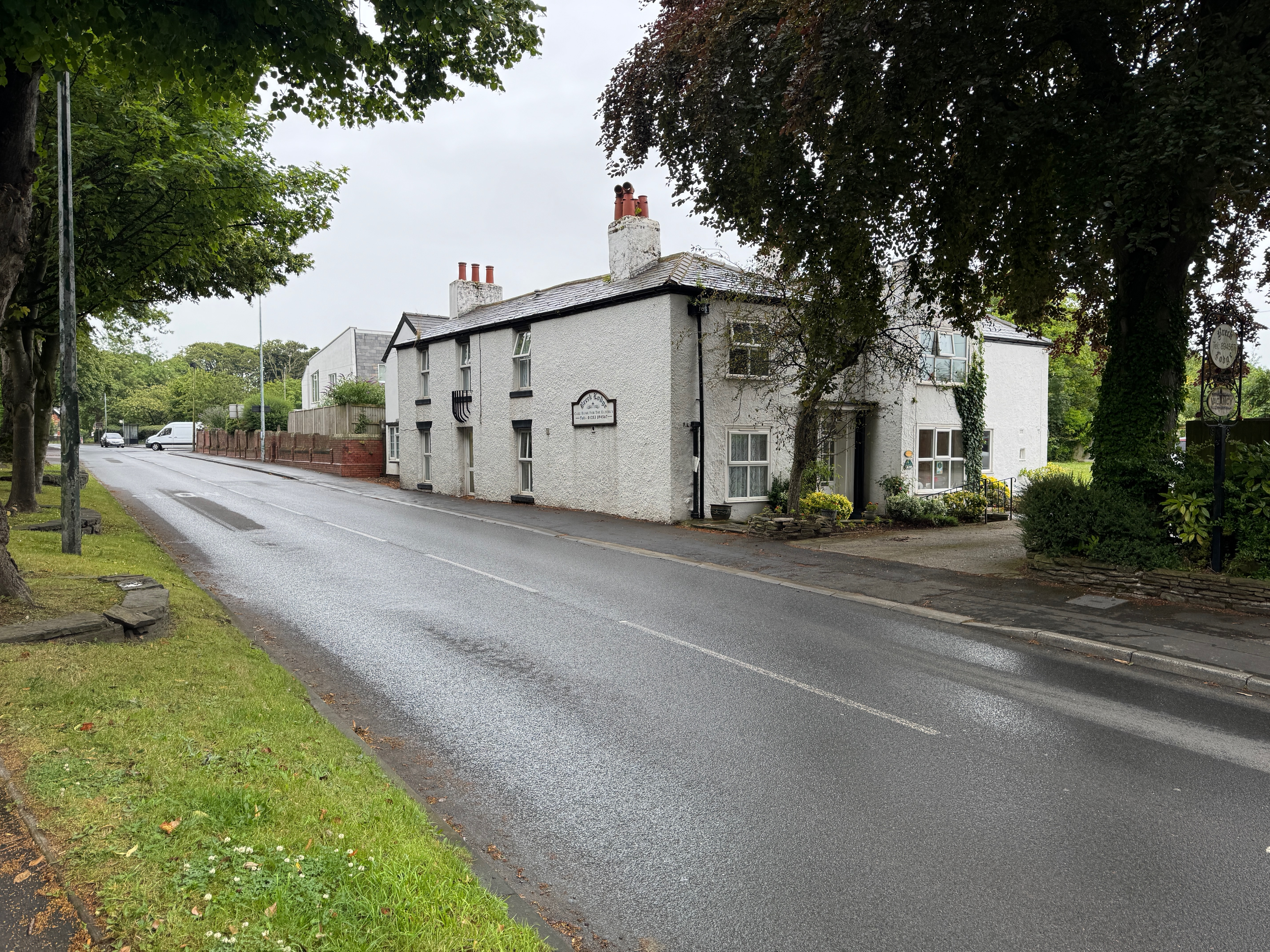
Breck Lodge

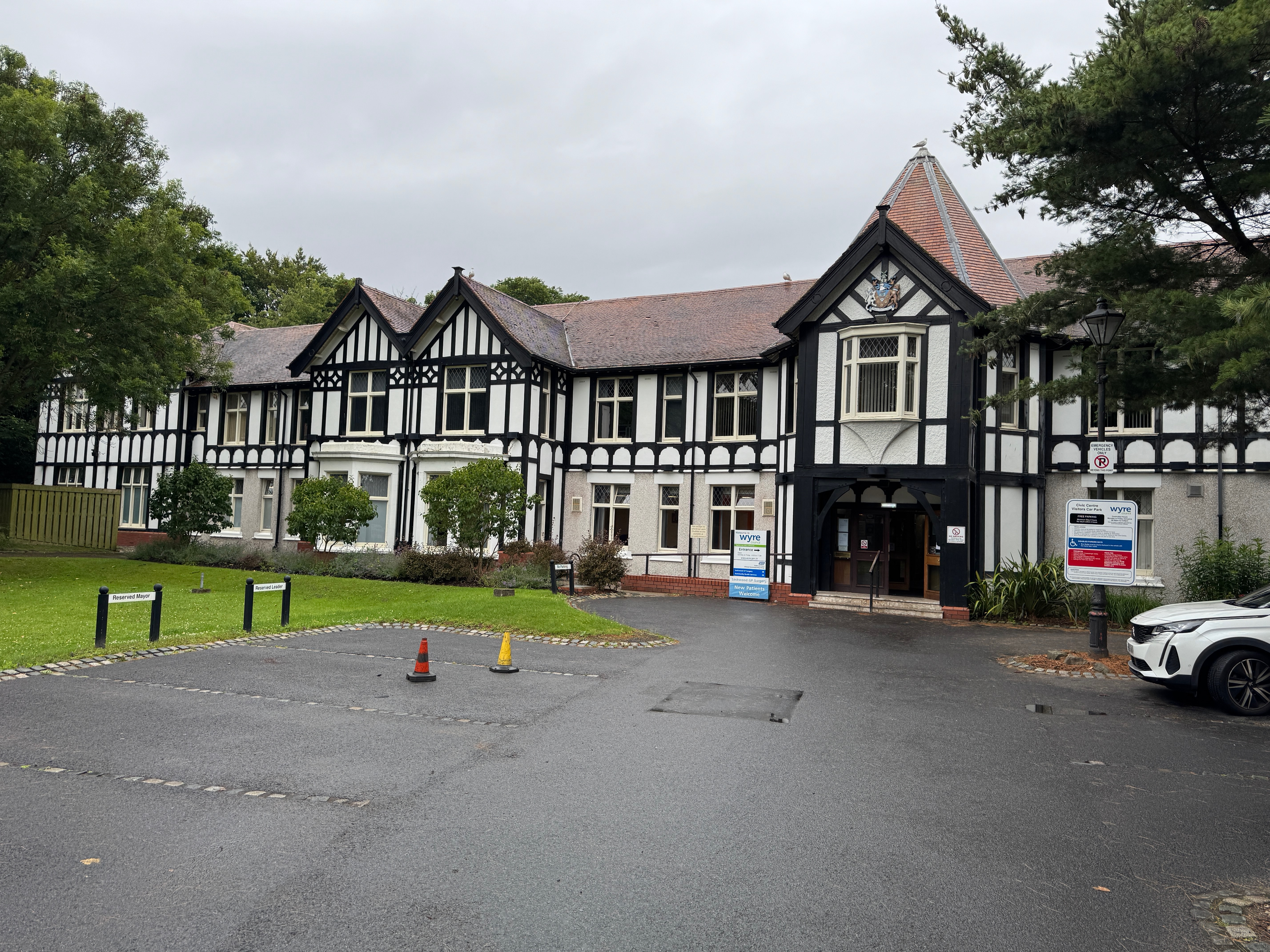
Wyre Civic Centre

== History ==
In 1940, during World War II, Breck Road was chosen by the Royal Air Force as one of two sites for personnel with minor infectious diseases to regain health. It was named "Emergency Hospital"; the other site was the Convalescent Home at Lytham Hall.

== Public transportation ==
Breck Road is served by Blackpool Transport's routes 5C, 74 and 75 and Transpora's route 523.
