= Tithebarn Street, Poulton-le-Fylde =

Street in Poulton-le-Fylde, England

Tithebarn Street
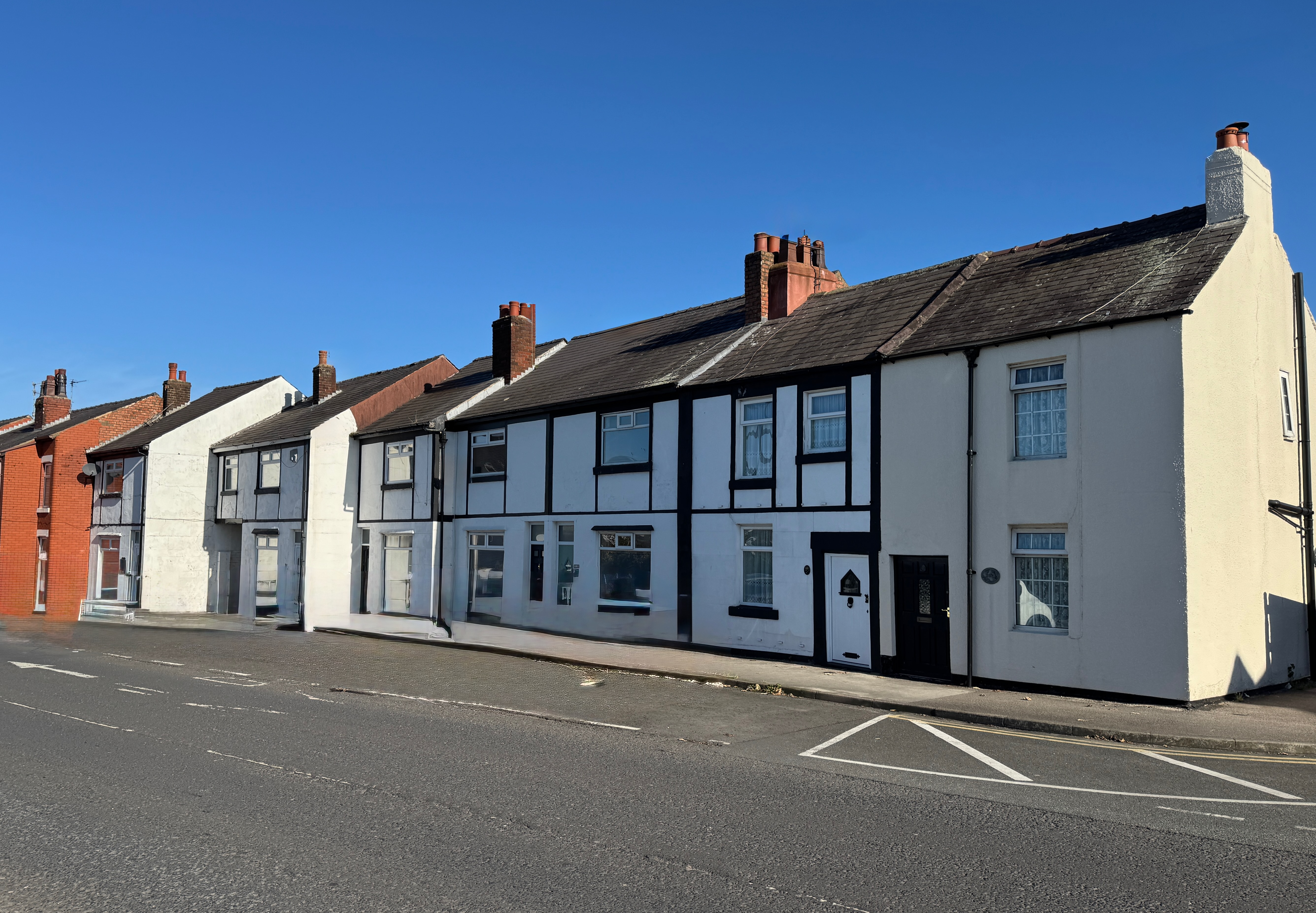
- Half-timbered homes along Tithebarn Street, near its junction with Queensway
- Interactive map of Tithebarn Street
- Namesake: Tythe Barn (now demolished)
- Location: Poulton-le-Fylde, Lancashire, England
- East end: Ball Street
- West end: Poulton Road

Tithebarn Street is a historic street in the market town of Poulton-le-Fylde, Lancashire, England. It runs for about 0.34 miles (0.55 km), from a convergence with Ball Street in the east to a convergence with Poulton Road in the west. Part of the B5267, it is one-way westbound from Ball Street to Queensway.

The street is named for an "ancient" Tythe Barn which used to stand where the Tithebarn Street entrance and exit to the Teanlowe Centre car park is today. It was demolished around 1970.

The home at 26 Tithebarn Street is a former farrier's cottage, dating to 1844.

Tithebarn Street is part of Wyre Council's Poulton-le-Fylde Conservation Area Appraisal.

== Public transport ==
Nearby Ball Street's bus stop stand one is served by Blackpool Transport routes 5, 5C and 12, while stand two is served by Transpora routes 24 and 523, Blackpool Transport's 74 and 75, Preston Bus's 76 and Stagecoach's 42. The two stands are to make up for there being no opposing bus stops, given that Ball Street and Tithebarn Street (in this section) are one-way.
