= Church Street, Poulton-le-Fylde =

Street in Poulton-le-Fylde, England

Church Street
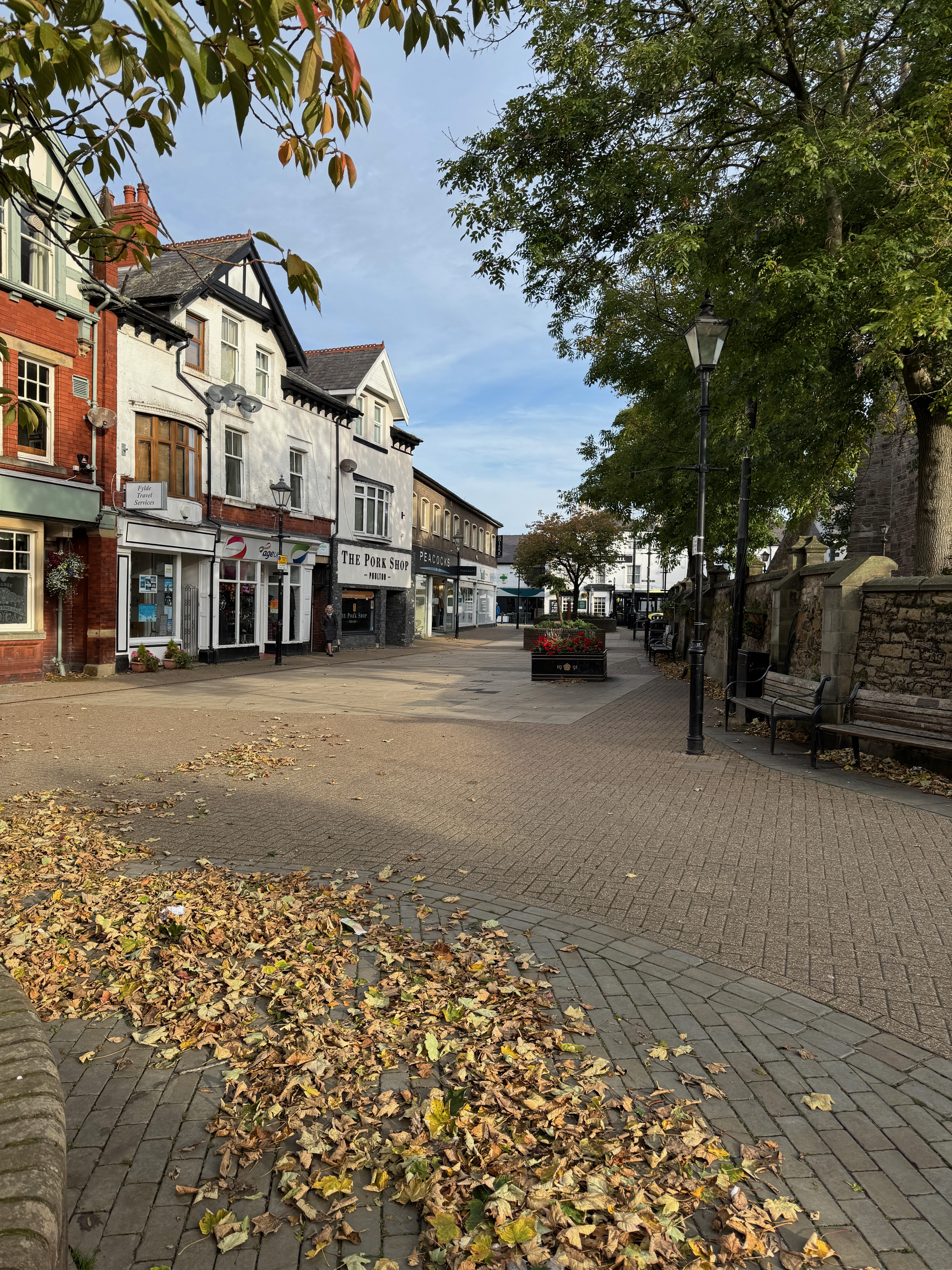
- Looking north along Church Street (2024)
- Interactive map of Church Street
- Namesake: St Chad's Church
- Length: 0.040 mi (0.064 km)
- Location: Poulton-le-Fylde, Lancashire, England
- North end: Ball Street
- South end: Market Place

Church Street is a historic street in the market town of Poulton-le-Fylde, Lancashire, England. It runs for about 210 feet (70 yards), from Ball Street in the north to Market Place in the south. An entrance to the Teanlowe Centre shopping precinct is located where Church Street merges into Market Place. The street was pedestrianised in 1983.

The eastern side of the street forms the western boundary of the raised graveyard of St Chad's Church, for which Church Street is named. Around 1910, the row of buildings lining the southern side of Ball Street, and those on the eastern side of Church Street (including one known as the Twenty Steps), were demolished, resulting in today's unobstructed view of St Chad's. Now, between the northern end of the pedestrianised Church Street to the west and the Thatched House (built in 1907) in the east, there are two bus stops along the paved area.

Where The Pork Shop stands today was the Plough Inn in the 18th century, one of around a dozen public houses in the town at the time.

The Old Town Hall public house, built in 1910, stands on Church Street. The Bay Horse Inn stood on the site from 1869.

In 1926, Church Street was listed in The London Gazette as one of the streets of Poulton under which a mains electricity supply was to be installed within a two-year period.

Church Street is part of Wyre Council's Poulton-le-Fylde Conservation Area Appraisal.

== Gallery ==
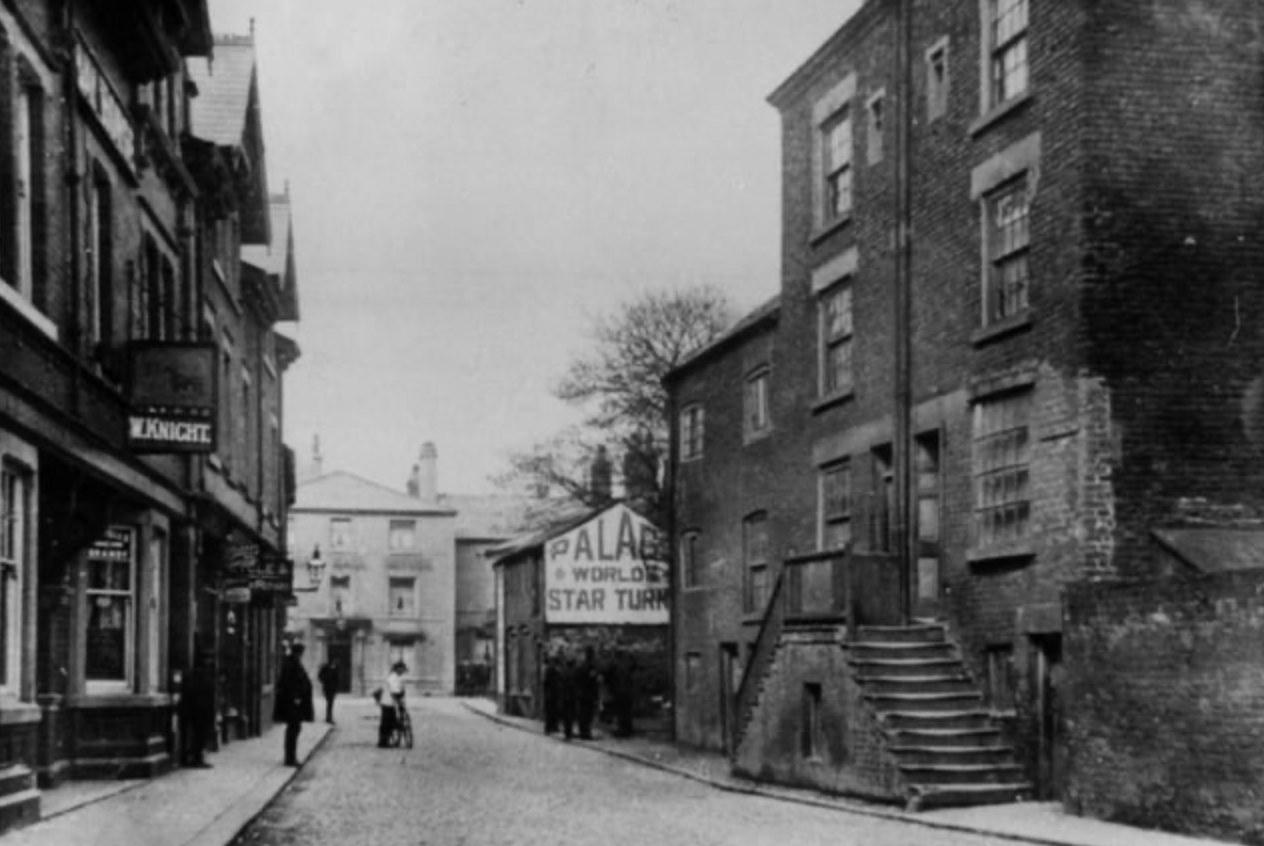
Church Street in the early 1900s, looking north to the Golden Ball on Ball Street

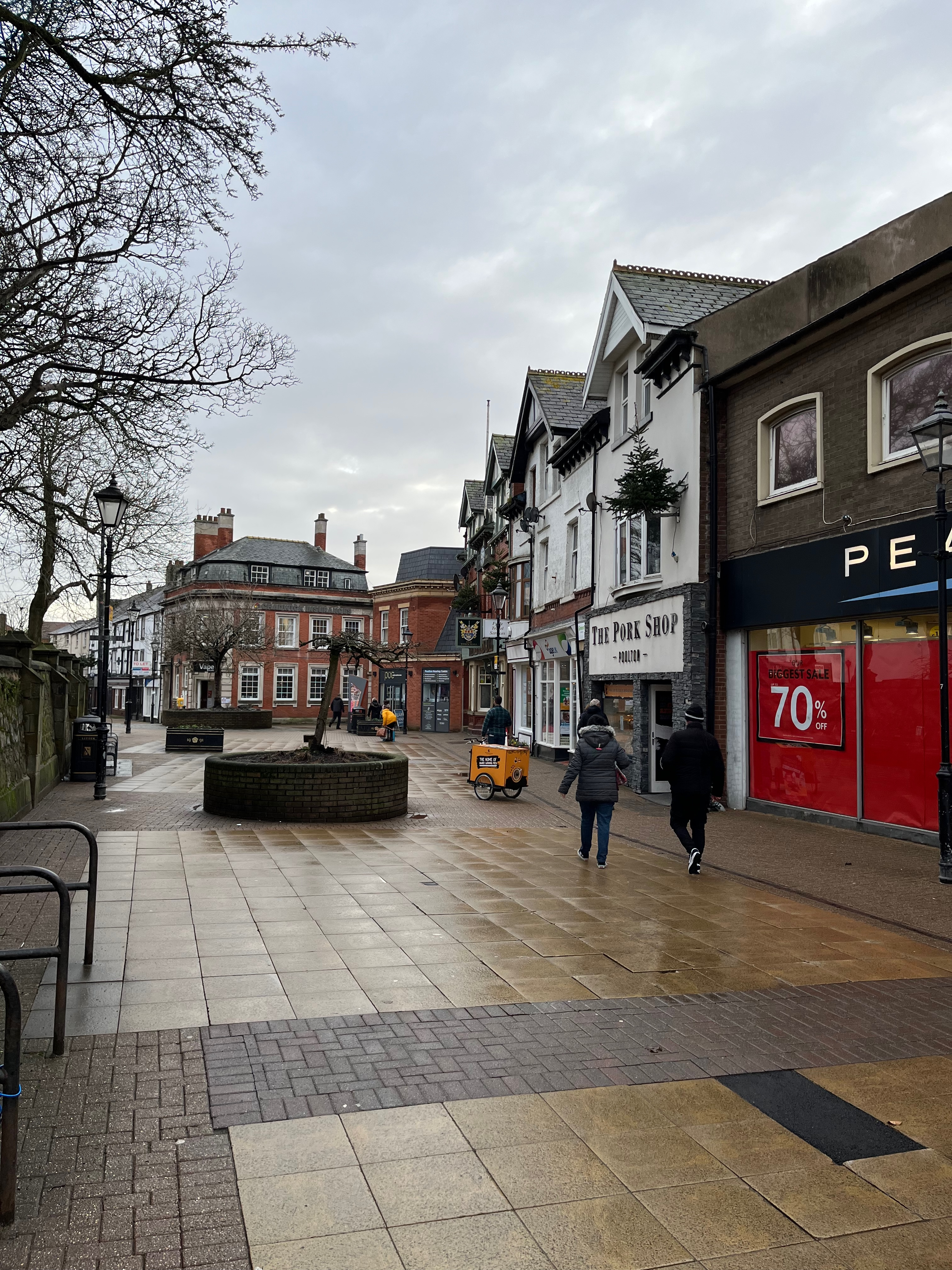
Looking south (2023)

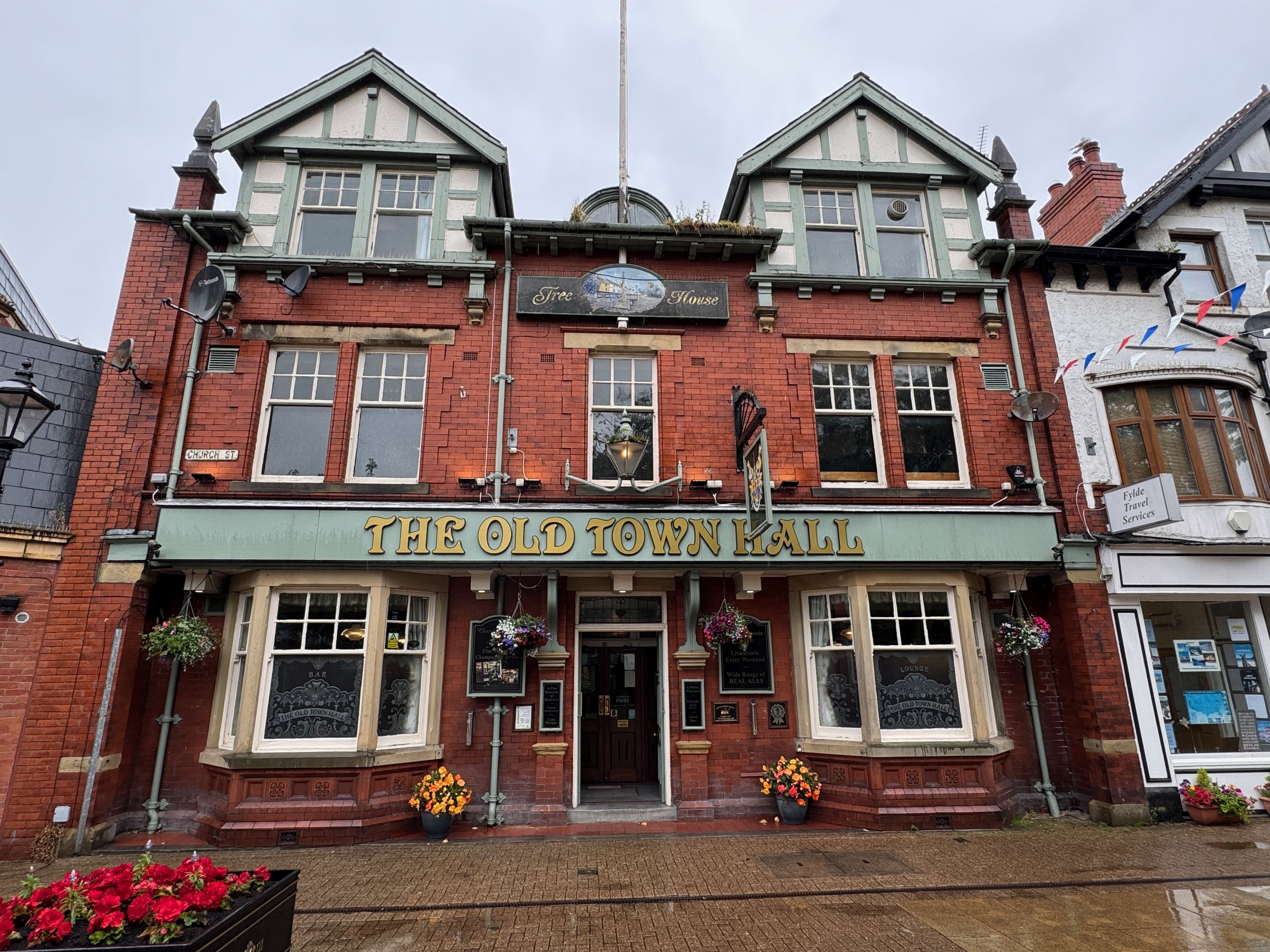
The Old Town Hall stands on Church Street

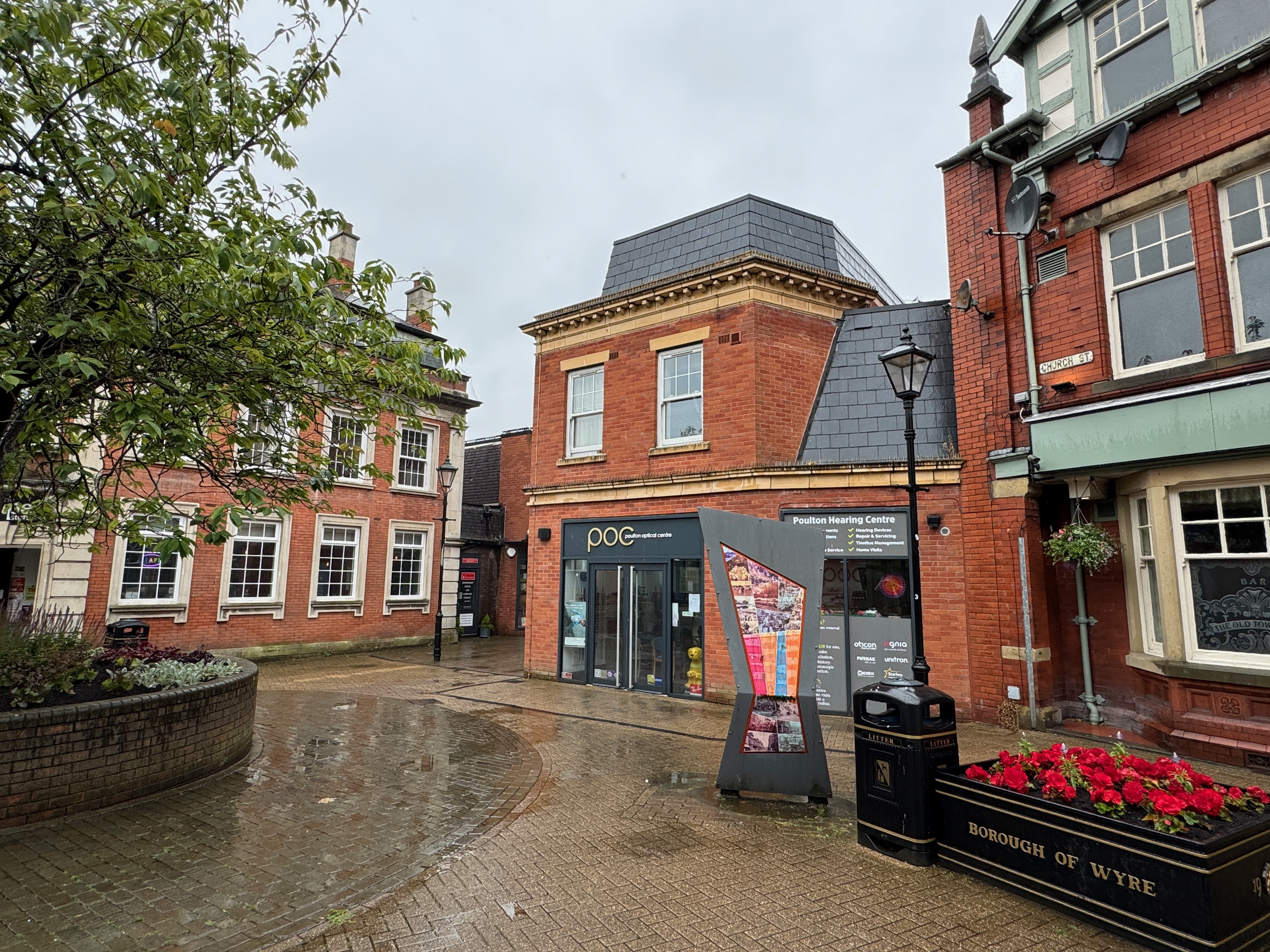
The former location of Burlington Street, which abutted the southern edge of the Old Town Hall, today occupied by part of the Teanlowe Centre
