= Ball Street =

Prominent street in Poulton-le-Fylde, England

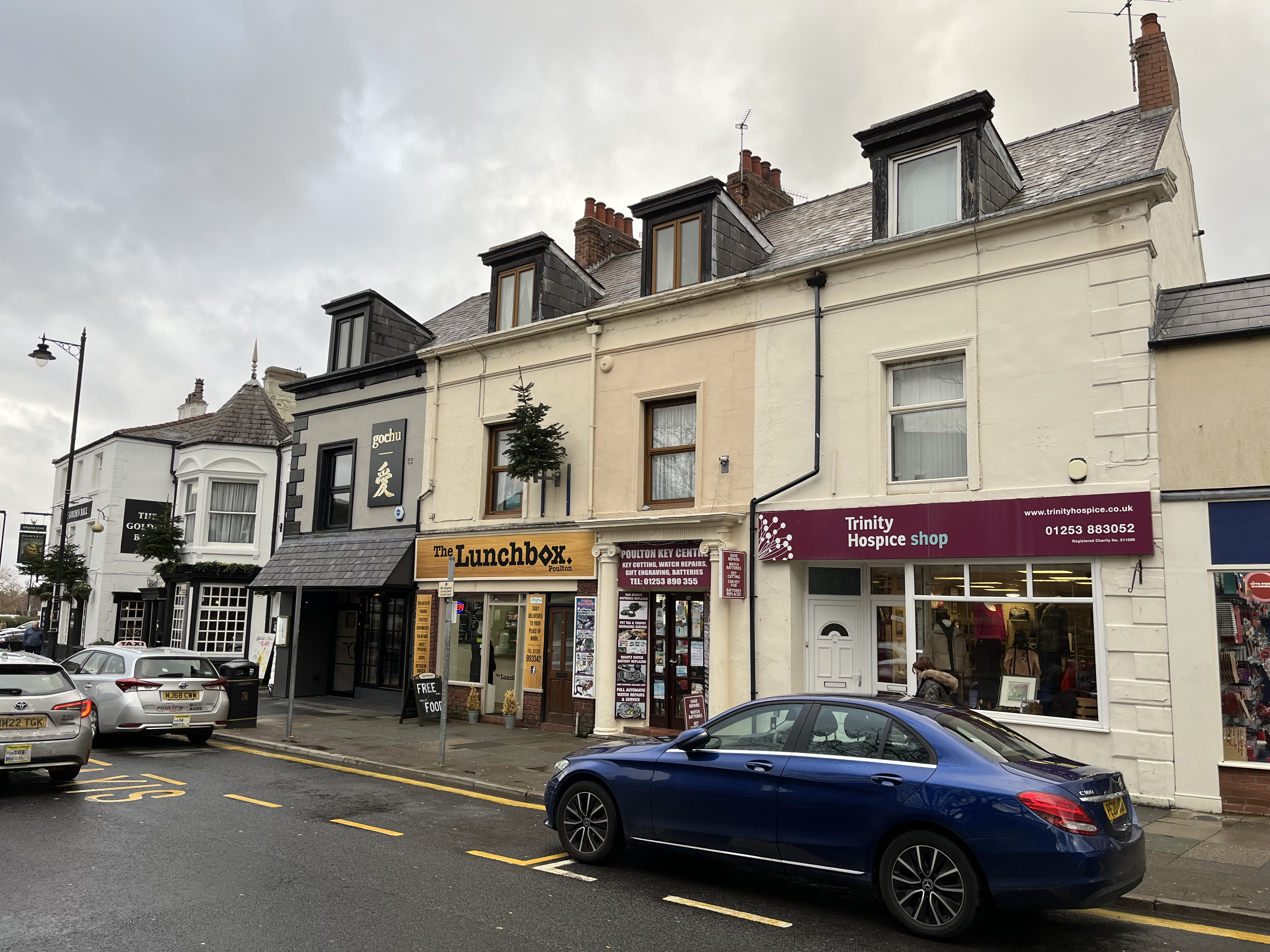
- Properties on the northern side of Ball Street, with the Golden Ball on the left
- Interactive map of Ball Street
- Namesake: Golden Ball
- Length: 0.057 mi (0.092 km)
- Location: Poulton-le-Fylde, Lancashire, England
- East end: Chapel Street, Vicarage Road and Breck Road
- West end: Tithebarn Street

Ball Street is a historic street in the market town of Poulton-le-Fylde, Lancashire, England. It runs for about 300 feet (100 yd), from the junction of Chapel Street, Vicarage Road and Breck Road in the east to its convergence with Tithebarn Street in the west. It is one-way westbound. The street, which is the start or end of today's B5267, has existed since at least the 19th century, which is when the Golden Ball public house (from which the street takes its name) was built. To the right of the Golden Ball once stood two houses. The shop at 5A Ball Street occupies the former entrance to one of the houses. One of them became a small private school.

The southern side of the street forms the northern boundary of the raised graveyard of St Chad's Church. In the early 20th century, the row of buildings lining this side of the street were demolished, resulting in today's unobstructed view of St Chad's. Now, between the northern end of the pedestrianised Church Street to the west and the Thatched House in the east, there are two bus stops along the paved area. The Thatched House, built in 1907, replaced a tavern believed to have been called the Green Man, which was on the site in 1793, and may have been built in the Middle Ages.

Ball Street, and the adjoining Tithebarn Street, are part of Wyre Council's Poulton-le-Fylde Conservation Area Appraisal.

Ball Street in the early 20th century, looking east towards where the Thatched House public house now stands

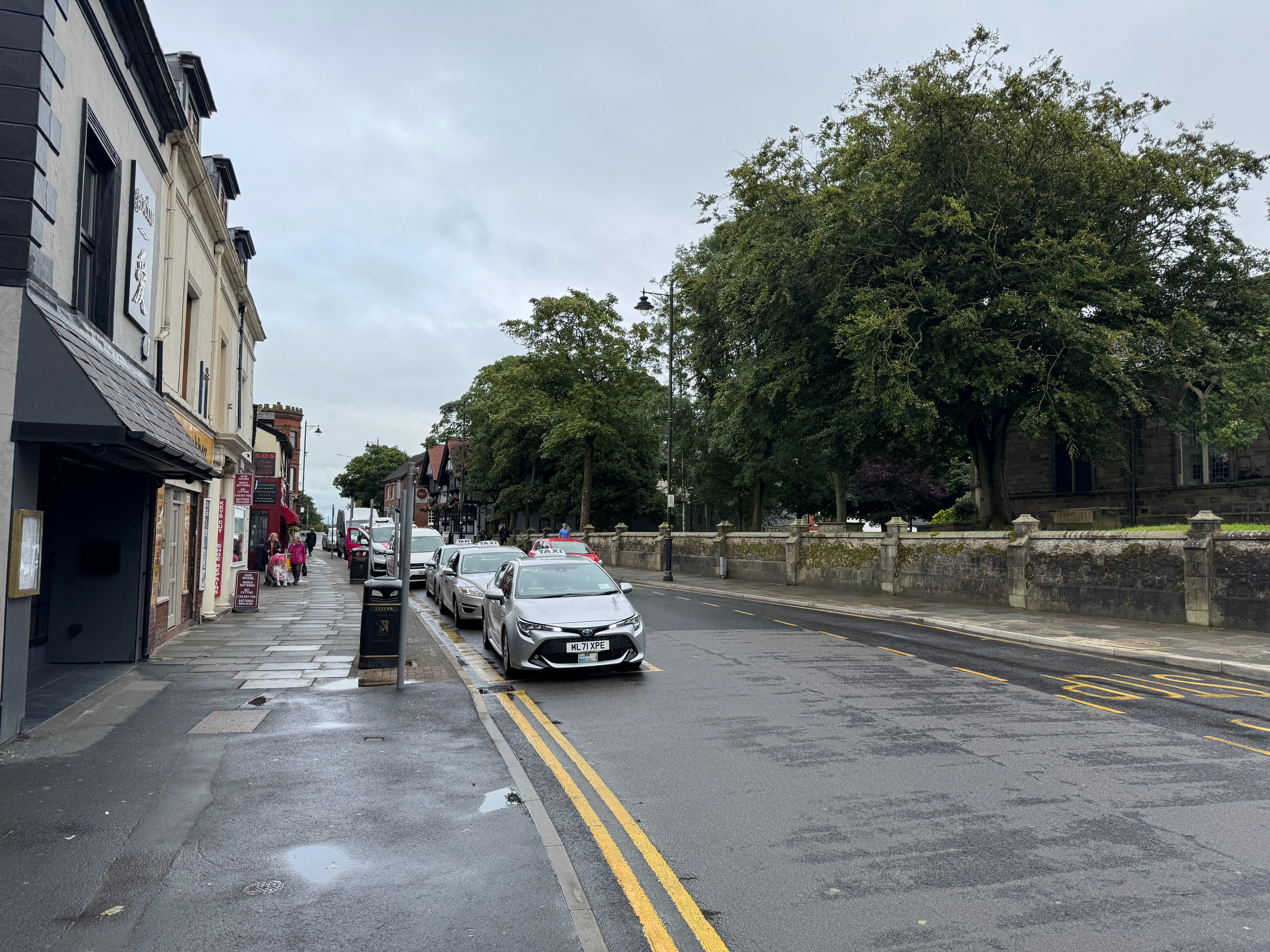
The same view in 2024

== Public transport ==
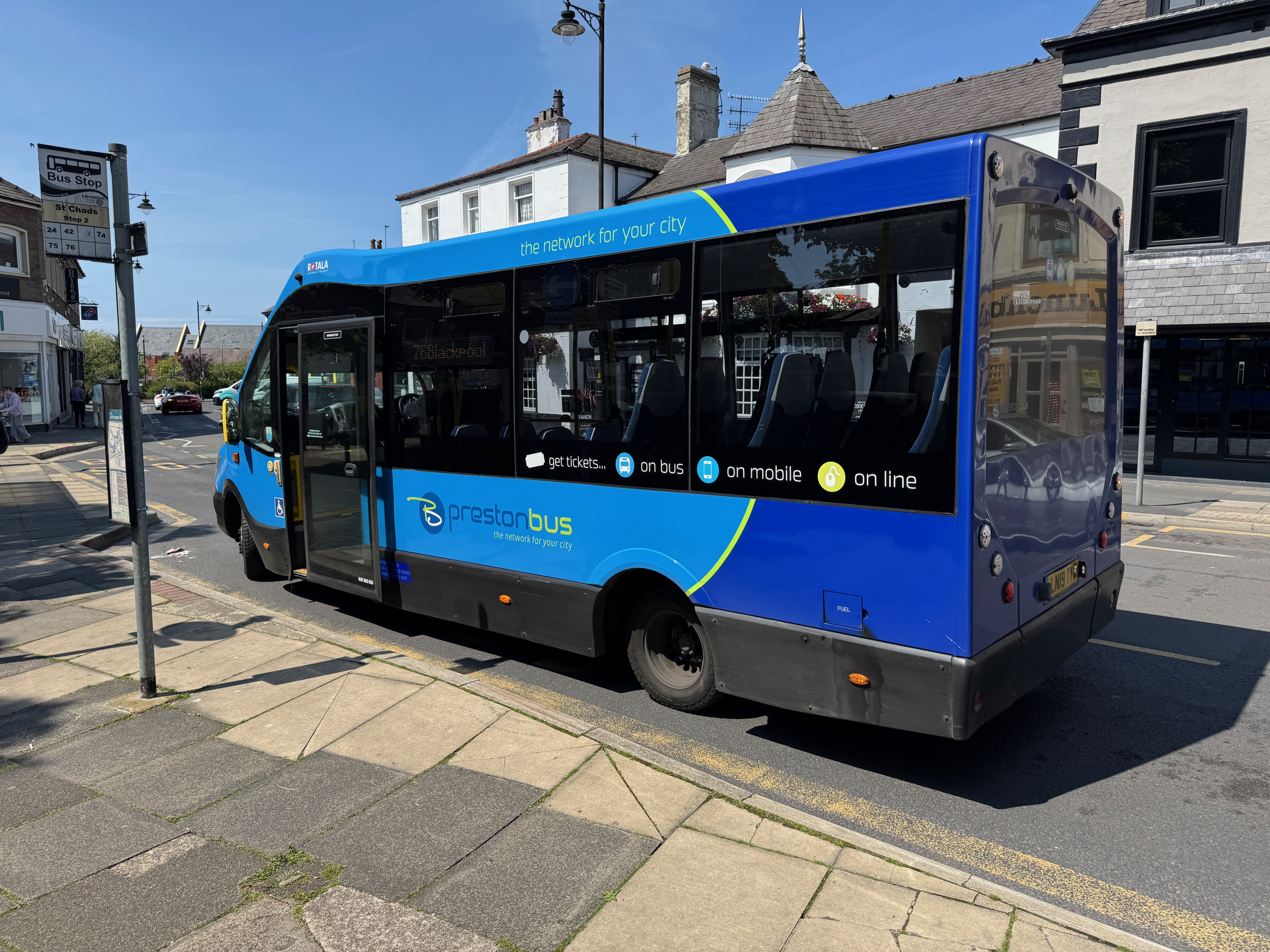
Preston Bus's route 76 on Ball Street in 2024

Ball Street bus stop's stand one is served by Blackpool Transport routes 5, 5C and 12, while stand two is served by Transpora routes 24 and 523, Blackpool Transport's 74 and 75, Preston Bus's 76 and Stagecoach's 42. The two stands are to make up for there being no opposing bus stops, given that Ball Street is one-way.
