= Golden Ball, Poulton-le-Fylde =

Pub in Lancashire, England

The Golden Ball
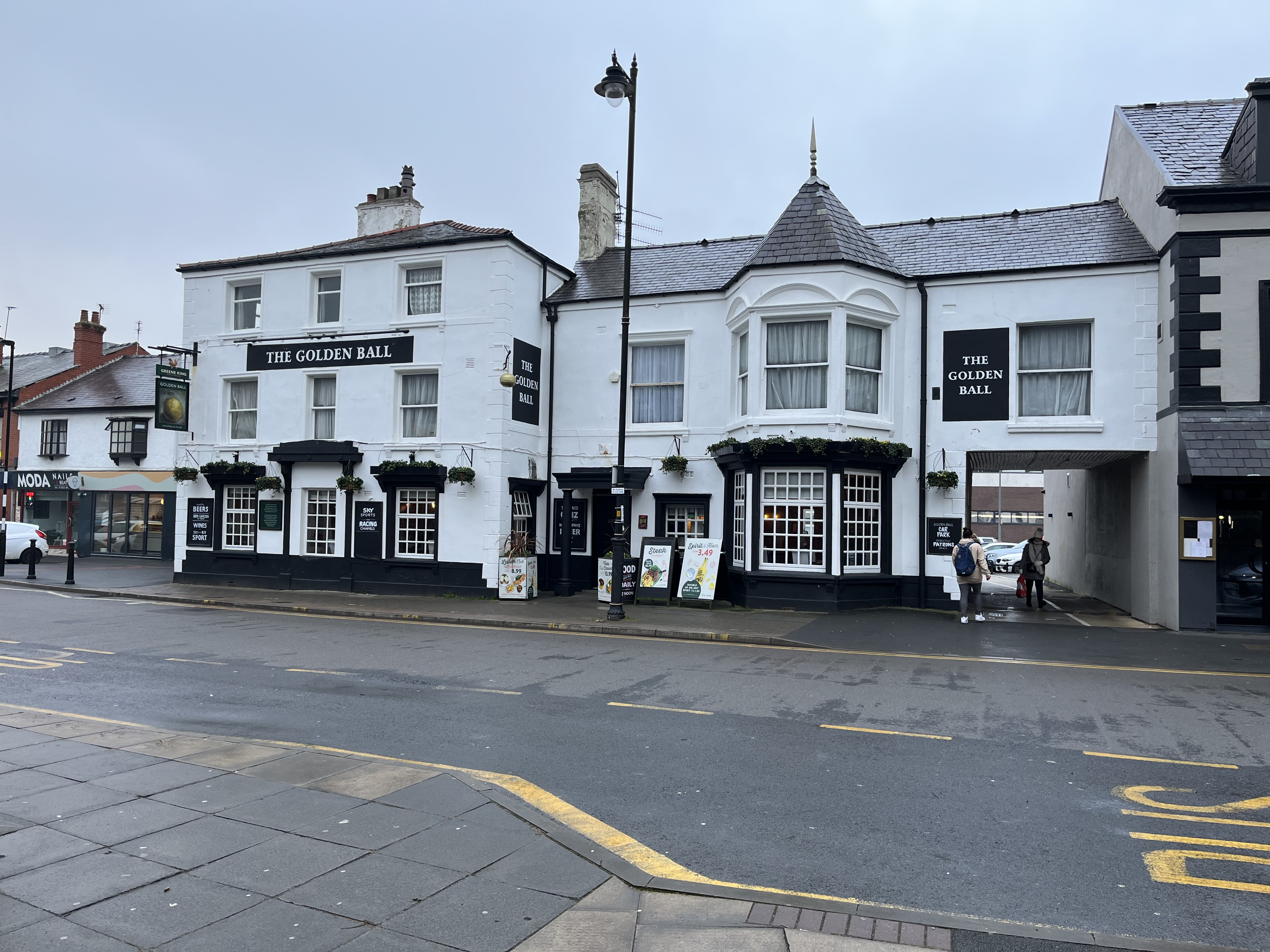
- The pub in 2023. The original doorway can be seen in the three-storey section of the building
- Interactive map of the The Golden Ball area
- Alternative names: The Golden Ball Hotel

General information
- Type: Public house and hotel
- Location: Ball Street, Poulton-le-Fylde, Lancashire, England
- Coordinates: 53.847604°N 2.99253°W
- Completed: 19th century
- Owner: Greene King

Technical details
- Floor count: 3

Website
- www.greeneking-pubs.co.uk/pubs/lancashire/golden-ball-hotel/

The Golden Ball is a public house and hotel on Ball Street in the English market town of Poulton-le-Fylde, Lancashire. Built in the 19th century, it was originally a coaching inn for travellers making their way to local towns and villages. During the course of its existence, the building has been a police courtroom, a newsroom and a café. Ball Street is named for the pub.

In 1847, the billiard room of the three-storey building hosted the first county court session in the town.

Beginning in 1897, an auction mart occupied the land behind the building, formerly the pub's gardens, until it was replaced by today's car park. It featured a bull ring and a calf ring. Some of the walls of the auction mart are still standing, with the rings for the tethering of bulls still attached. The Auction Market Company folded in 1964, and some of its buildings became shops — including Gleeson's Joiners, The Victorian Birdcage, The Paper Tree and a charity shop. These were demolished in 2006.

Tom Lockwood, landlord of the pub in the 19th century, formed Catterall & Swarbrick Brewery Ltd. in 1880 with fellow locals William Catterall and John Swarbrick.

The pub is one of 32 buildings in the town's Conservation Area.

As of 2023, the building is owned by Greene King. It was formerly a Tetley's establishment.

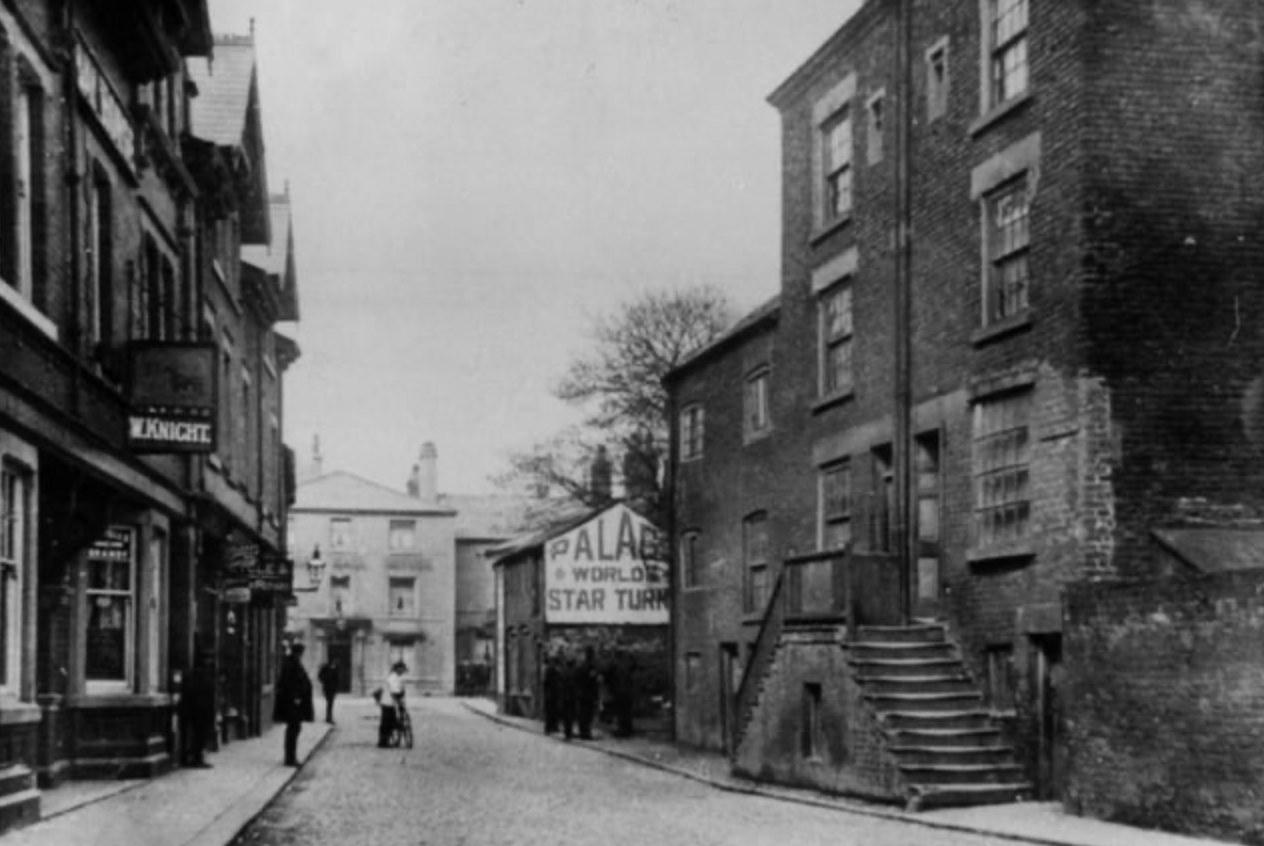
Church Street in the early 1900s. The Golden Ball, using its original entrance, is in view on Ball Street

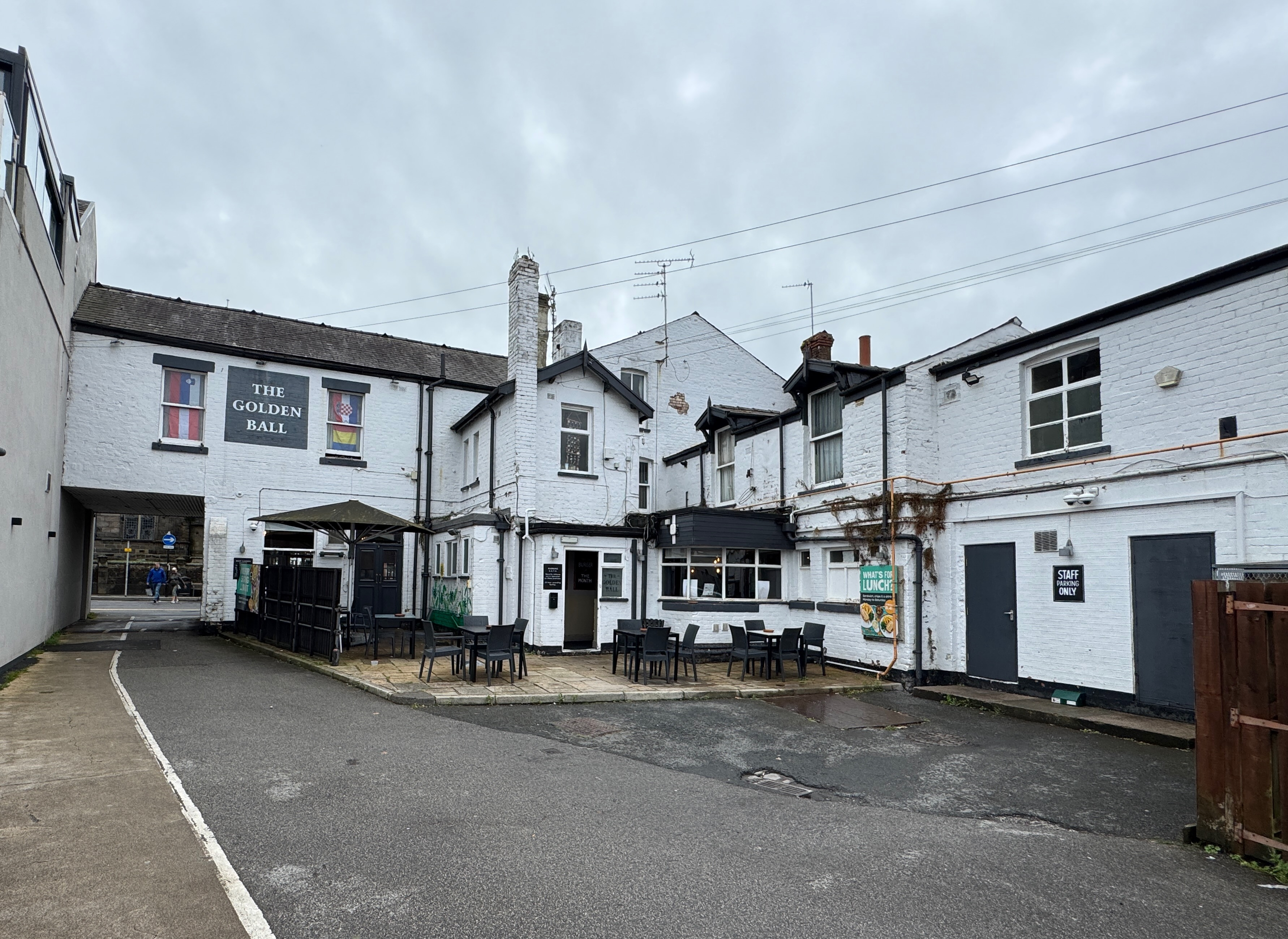
Rear (2024)

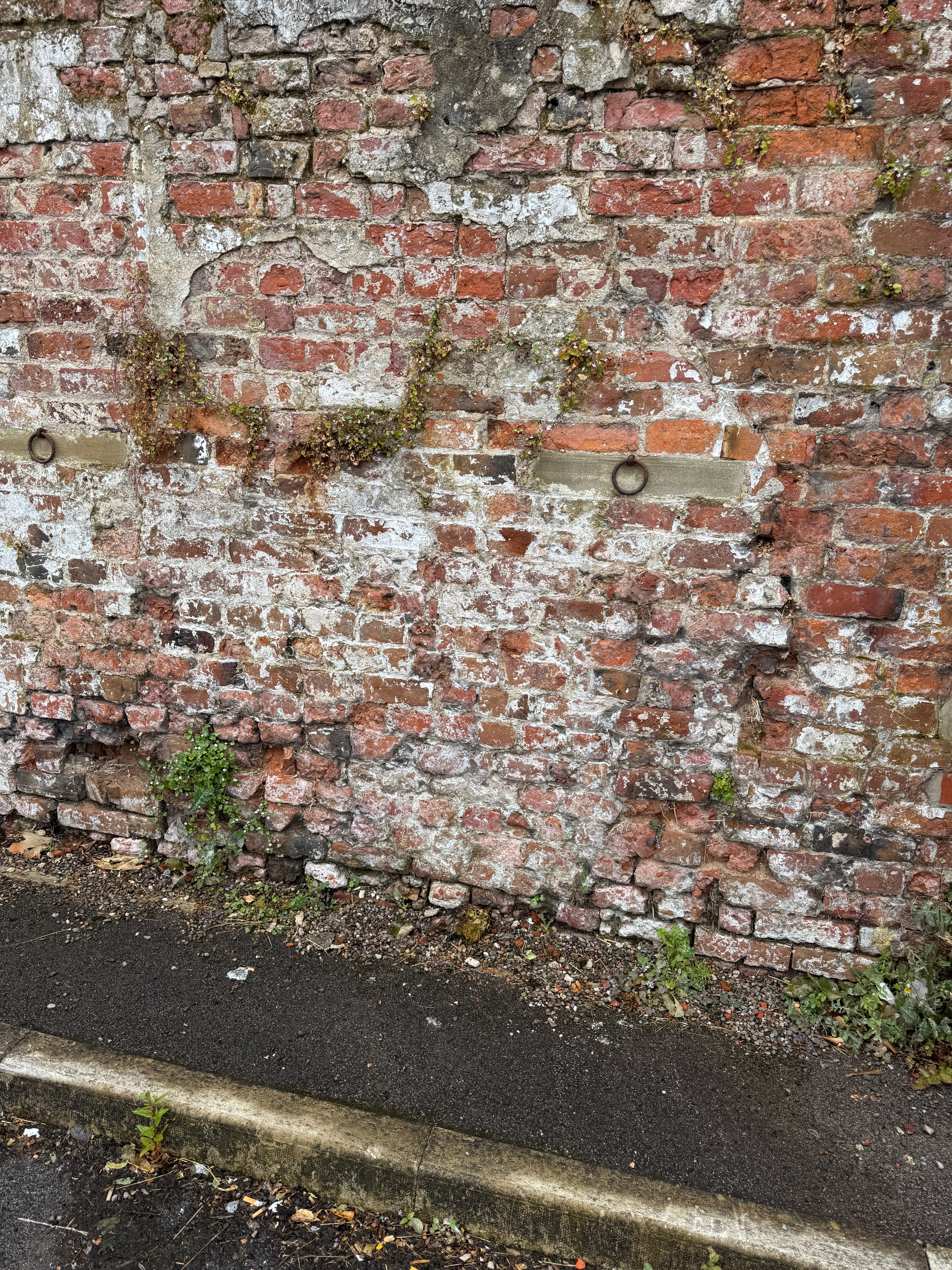
Bull tethering rings in the car park

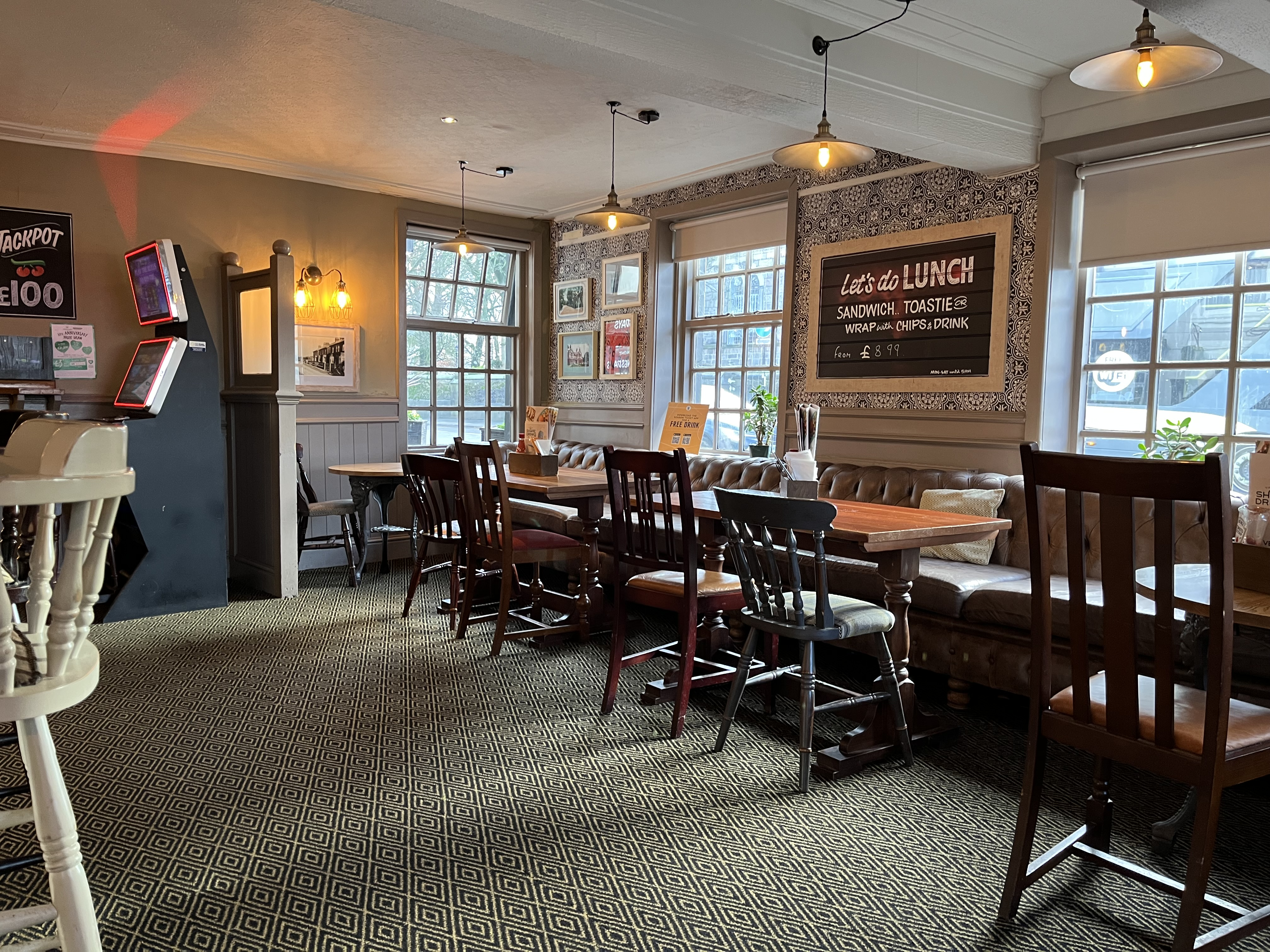
Part of the pub's interior. The windows look onto Ball Street
