= The Big Lemon =

Bus operator in Brighton, England

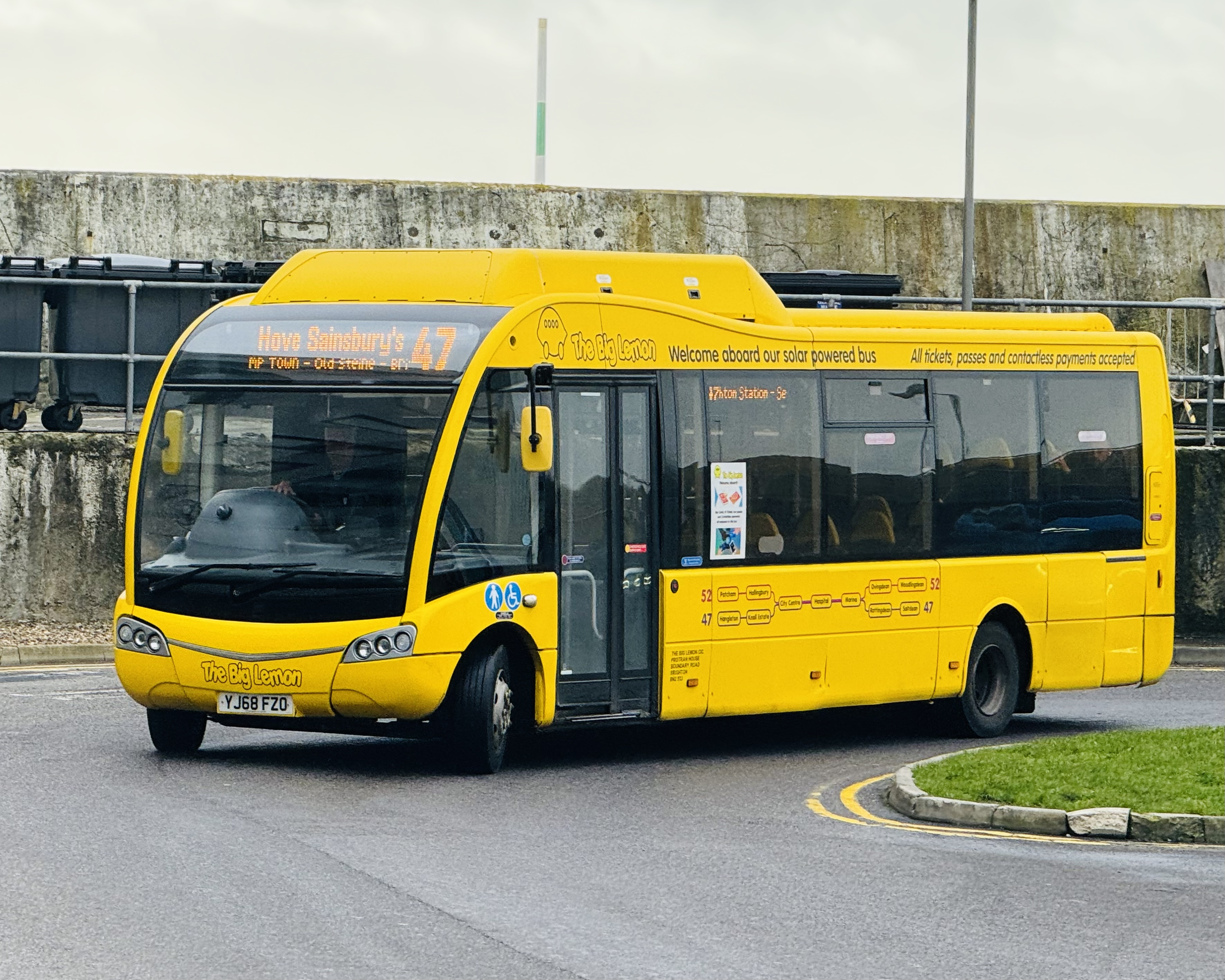
- Optare Solo SR in 2023
- Parent: Tom Druitt
- Founded: 2007
- Headquarters: Brighton
- Service area: Brighton and Hove, East Sussex, Bristol, Bath
- Service type: Bus services, coach hire, festivals, Sunday walks
- Routes: Brighton: Brighton Metropolitan College, Legal & General (Private contracts); Bristol & Surrounding Areas: 2V, X10, 20, 40, 61, X91, 99, 515, K1, P1, Y8
- Destinations: Brighton, Sussex, UK, Bristol
- Depots: 1
- Fuel type: Biodiesel, Solar Powered Electric
- Website: www.thebiglemon.com

The Big Lemon is a bus and coach operator in Brighton, East Sussex, Bristol and Bath. It is registered as a community interest company.

== History ==
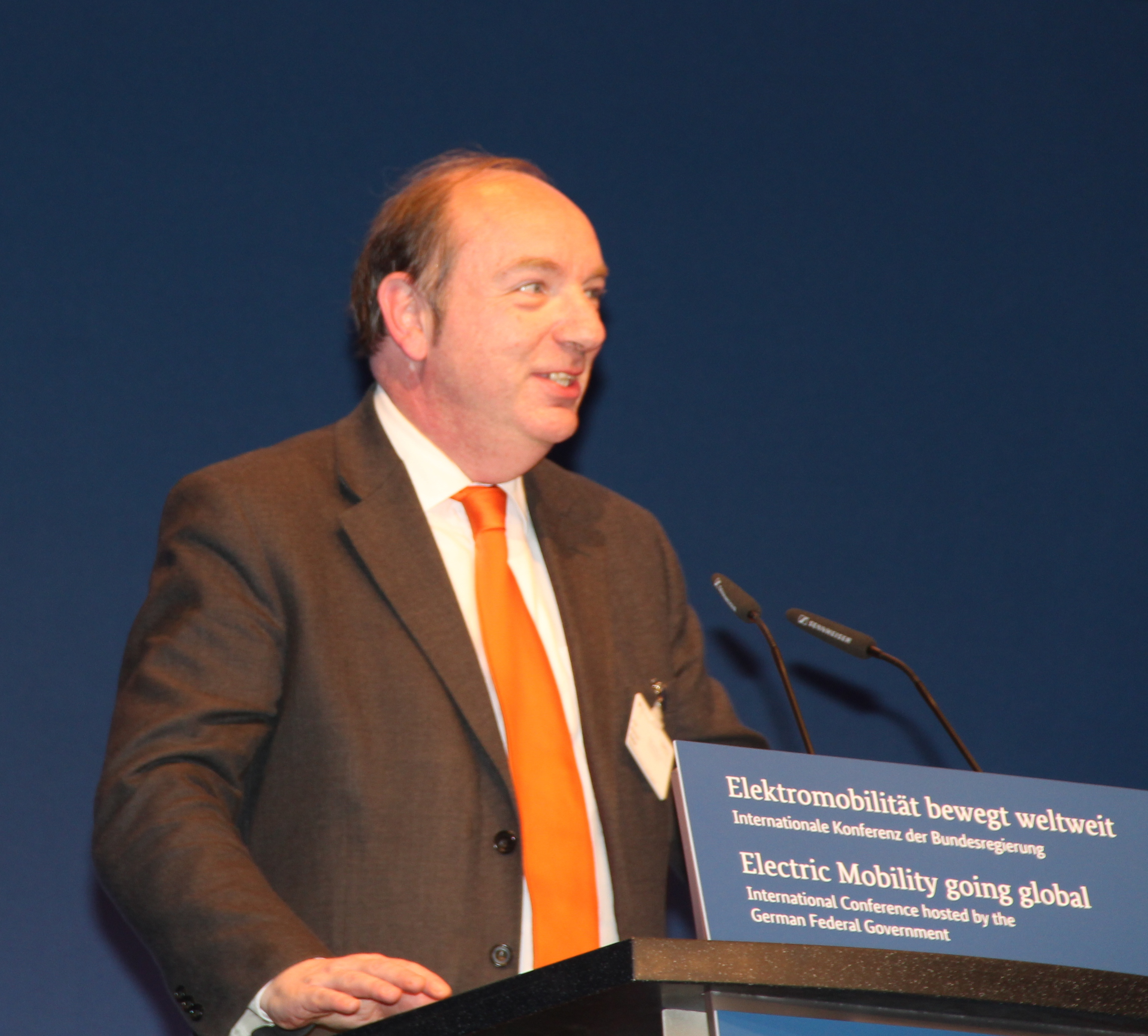
Norman Baker (MD 2017–2018)

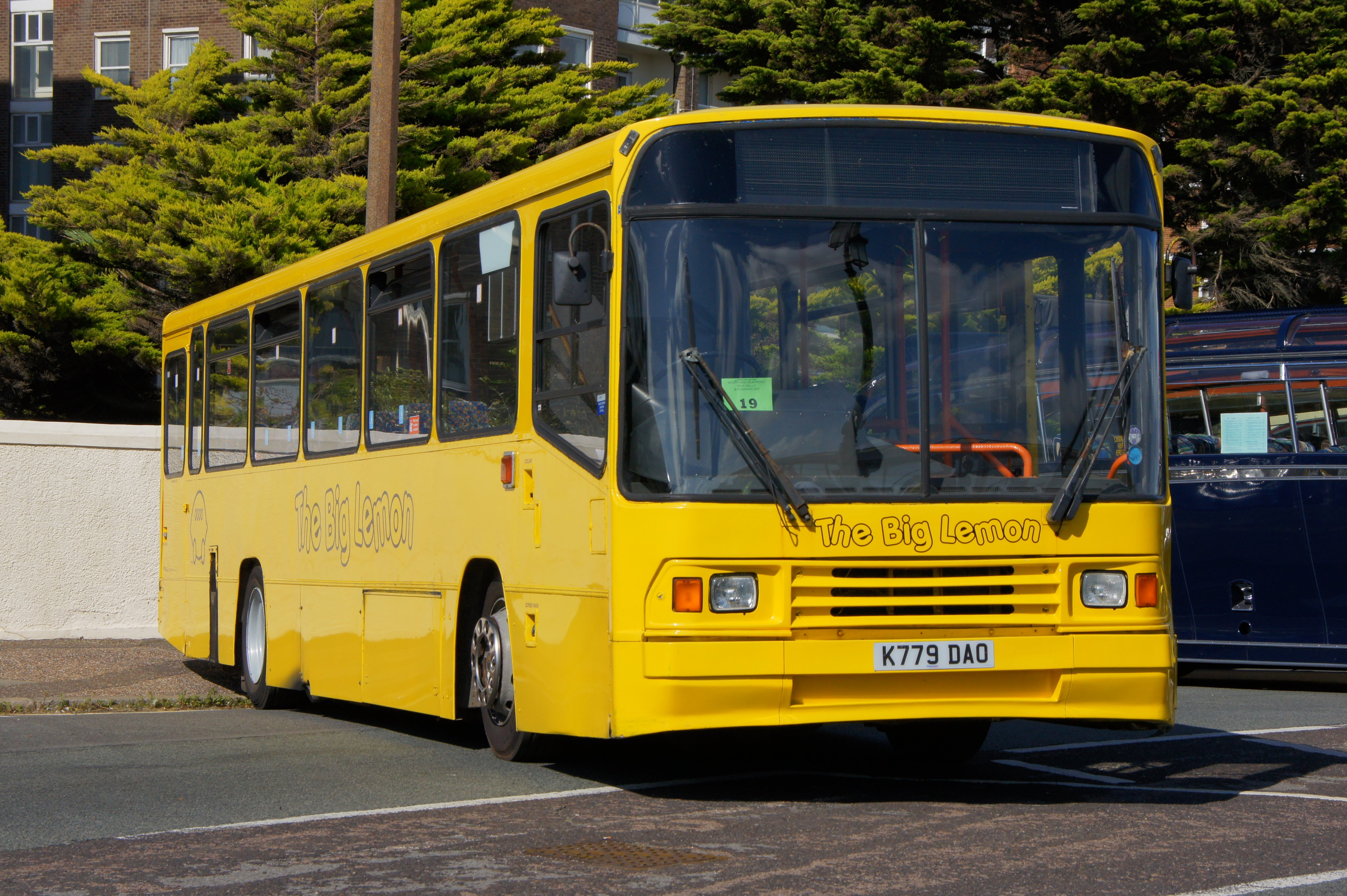
Alexander PS bodied Volvo B10M in July 2012

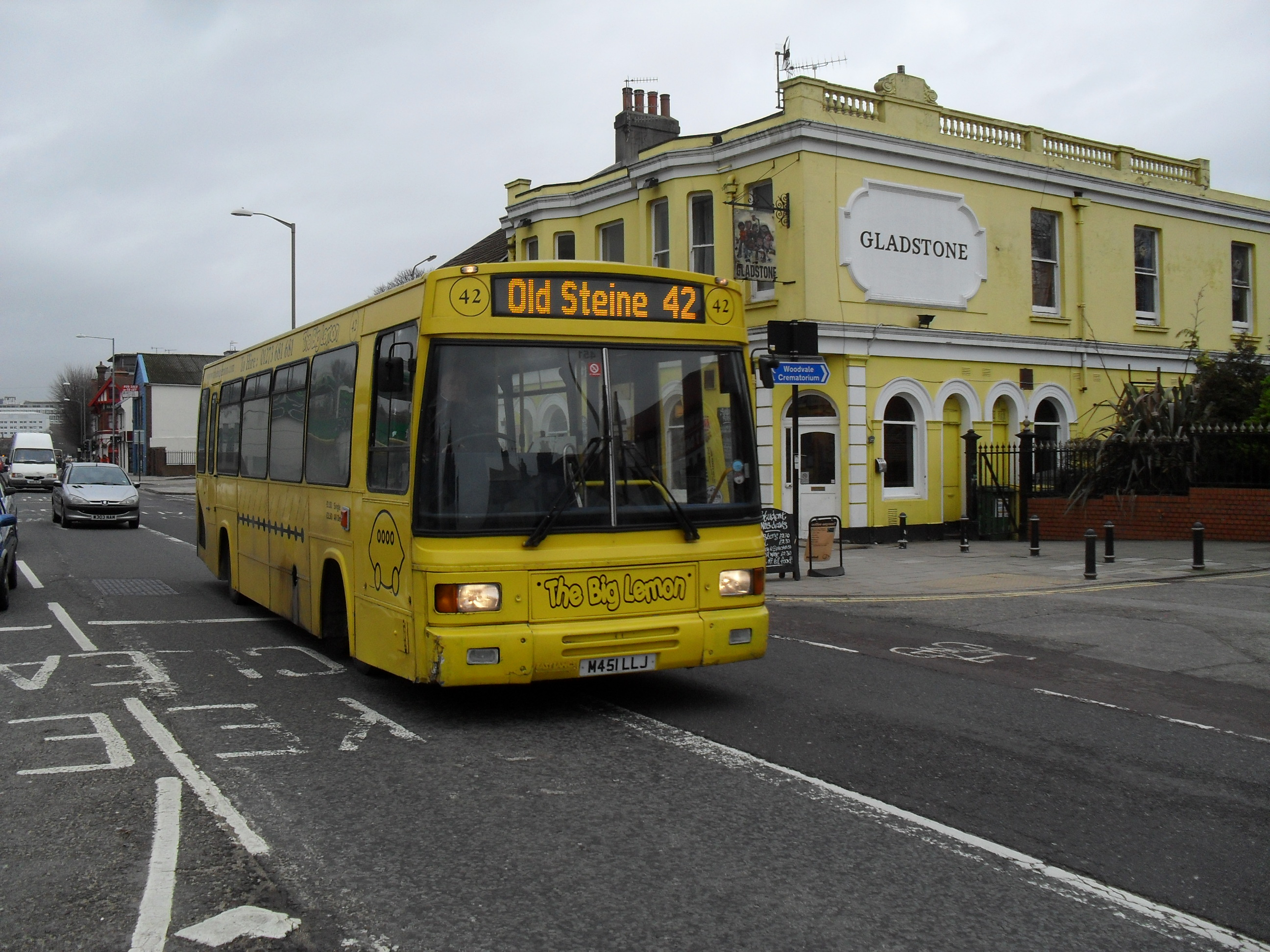
East Lancs EL2000 bodied Dennis Dart on in Brighton in January 2011

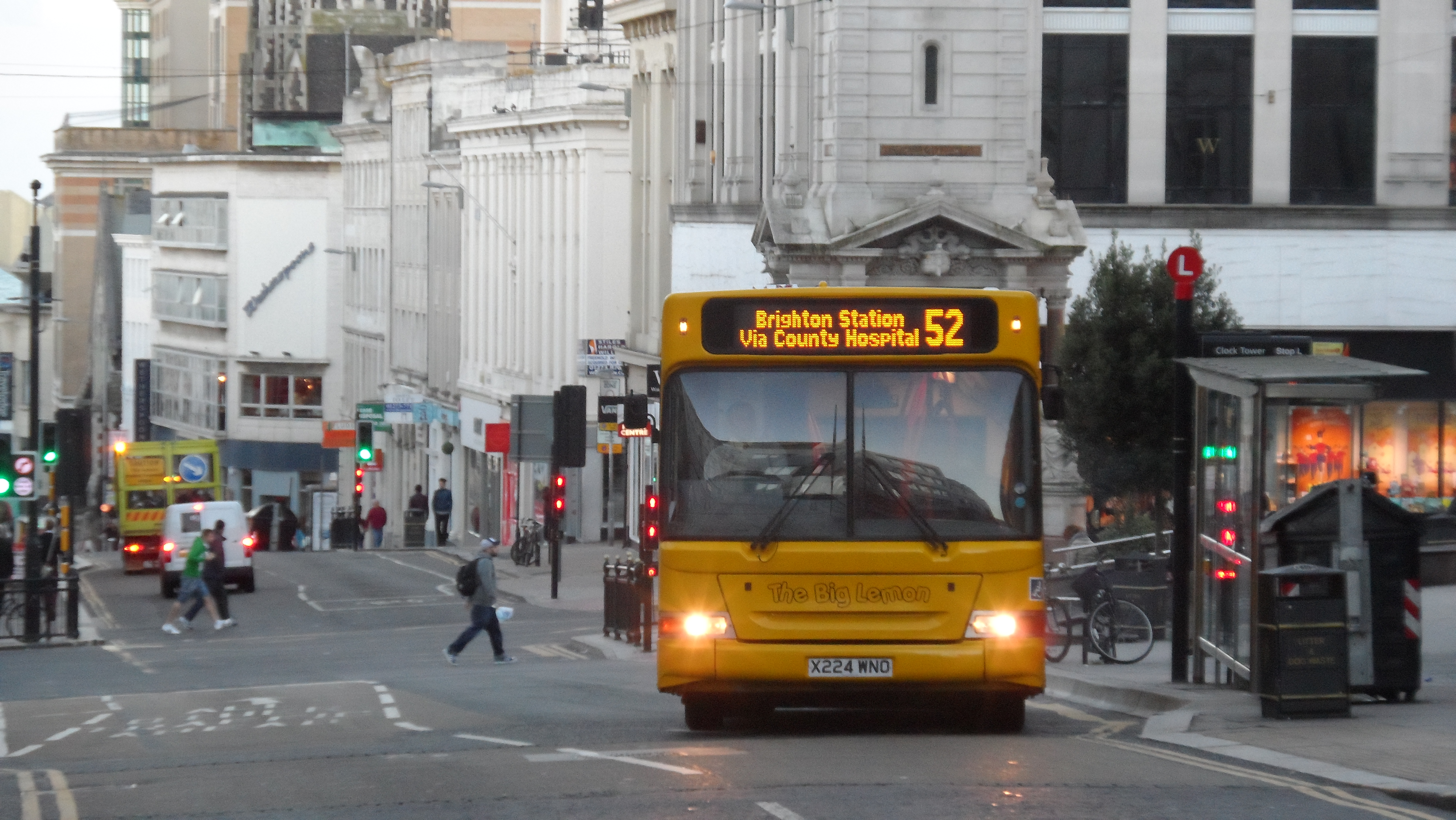
Plaxton Pointer 2 bodied Dennis Dart SLF in Brighton in September 2013

The Big Lemon was founded by Tom Druitt in 2007. After gaining an operator licence, the first public transport route was launched on 1 September 2007. Route 42X originally operated from Brighton Station to Falmer Station, with hopes to expand the operation with more routes. After lower than expected passenger numbers, and competition from Brighton & Hove, the company scaled down the level of service, re-launching it in January 2008, and to reconsider its operating model. From 7 to 29 January 2008, the service operated on a reduced frequency, ending once the original route registration expired after the mandated period.

Route 42/42A/N42 was The Big Lemon's first public bus service, originating from its service 42X. Service 42 operated from Churchill Square to Sussex University via Lewes Road. During the evenings the route number changed to 42A and served West Street. It would later be renumbered N42. The N42 charged higher fares as it operated from 00:00 – 04:00. In 2011 the company renumbered routes 42A and N42 to 42.

Route 43 ran from September 2010 - January 2011, focusing on student trade and operating from Old Steine during the day and Hove during the evening up to Brighton University's Falmer campus.

Route 44 was introduced at the same time as route 43 in September 2010, operating from Churchill Square to Saltdean.

In September 2012 The Big Lemon successfully tendered to operate route 52 between Brighton Marina and Woodingdean which also goes to Ovingdean under contract to Brighton & Hove City Council.

On 17 March 2017, it was announced that Norman Baker, the former Liberal Democrat MP and Parliamentary under-secretary of state for the Department for Transport, had been appointed managing director of the Big Lemon. Baker resigned in January 2018.

On 17 September 2017, The Big Lemon took over routes 16, between Portslade and Hangleton, 47, between Brighton station and East Saltdean, 56, between Knoll estate and Patcham, 57, between Brighton station and East Saltdean and 66 which goes in a circular route around Portslade and Hangleton. Additionally, one Saturday morning journey on Brighton & Hove's route 21A, from Goldstone Valley to Brighton Marina, has been operated by the Big Lemon since 16 September 2018. From 29 April 2019, Route 66 was withdrawn and incorporated into route 47, and Route 56 was replaced with an extension to Routes 47 and 52.

=== Seaford & District ===
The Big Lemon had partnered up with Lewes-based Seaford and District to create a coach company called "Brighton Horizon Coaches" on 4 August 2020. Together they had set up a fleet of 11 coaches.

Five months later, on 9 January 2021, Seaford and District was acquired by The Big Lemon, with Ryan Wrotny taking over management of the company. David Mulpeter, Seaford & District's Managing Director, was said to be taking his first steps into retirement following 10 and a half years running the company since its founding in 2010. The operating licences, however, will remain separate.

=== Expansion into the West of England ===
In September 2022, following the closure of the HCT Group in Bristol, The Big Lemon announced that they would be operating services in the city supported by subsidy from the West of England Combined Authority. On 30 September 2022, the Traffic Commissioner approved the licence for The Big Lemon to operate bus services in Bristol. The Big Lemon's four Bristol routes (505, 506, 515 & 516) commenced operations on Monday 3 October 2022 initially using a batch of Enviro 200s previously operated by Bristol Community Transport as well as four Optare Solos transferred from the company's Brighton operations. On 28 November 2022, The Big Lemon started operating services 11, 12 and 20 in Bath following these routes' withdrawal by First West of England in October. Their routes in Bath are operated using 3 hired-in Wright StreetLites and an electric Higer Steed transferred from the company's operations in Brighton.

In July 2024, following Transpora Group's cessation of operations in the area, The Big Lemon stepped in to operate some of their former services.

=== Loss of Brighton contracts ===
In February 2025, Brighton and Hove City Council awarded Compass Travel the contract to operate routes 16, 16A, 47, 47A, 52, 52A and 57 from 31 March. As Compass Travel would use diesel buses, as opposed to The Big Lemon's electric ones, The Big Lemon questioned whether the decision was compatible with the council's net-zero emissions ambitions.

=== Loss of Bristol contracts ===
In April 2026, The Big Lemon lost the routes: 2V, 40, X91, 99, P1 and Y8 to Eurocoaches. The loss was somewhat mitigated when a three-year contract was awarded to the company later that year for a new route, the 100, which replaced the withdrawn 2V and 99 services.

== Services ==
As of April 2026, The Big Lemon operate 12 services (8 services in Brighton and the surrounding area: 149, 150, 266, 267, 268, 269, 342, 382; and, 4 services in Bristol and surrounding areas: X10, 20, 515, K1). Additionally, they operate shuttle buses for Brighton Metropolitan College and Legal & General Coaches ran on biodiesel that was refined from waste cooking oil until 2017. Buses run on diesel and batteries charged via mix of solar power and the main grid.

== Fleet ==
As of April 2020, The Big Lemon has a fleet of 19 vehicles, including 3 minibuses and 16 regular buses. The minibuses don't operate regular bus routes, rather operating on the Legal & General and Brighton Metropolitan College shuttles.

== See also ==
- List of bus operators of the United Kingdom
