= The Royal Oak Hotel =

Pub in Lancashire, England

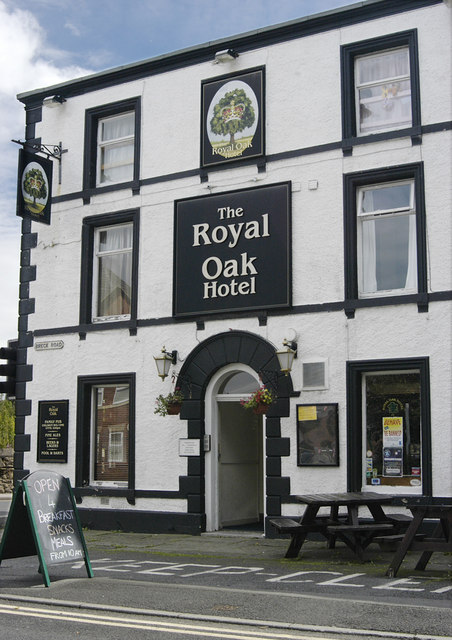
- The pub in 2008

- Location within the Borough of Wyre Location within Lancashire Location within England
- Interactive map of the The Royal Oak Hotel area
- Former names: Old Oak

General information
- Type: Public house
- Location: Breck Road, Poulton-le-Fylde, Lancashire, England
- Coordinates: 53.85078748°N 2.9884419°W
- Completed: 1842
- Demolished: June 2018

Technical details
- Floor count: 3

The Royal Oak Hotel was a public house and hotel in the market town of Poulton-le-Fylde, Lancashire. It stood on Breck Road at its junction with Station Road. Built in 1842, it was, up until its demolition, the only hotel in the town. It replaced an earlier building, known as the Old Oak, which had also been a dye works.

Joseph Redshaw was the pub's first tenant in July 1843. It was in 1860, during the time of the landlordship of Albany Featherstonhaugh (1791–1871) that the pub was renamed the Royal Oak Hotel. It was home to the local branch of the Inland Revenue and an excise office.

During its heyday, inquests and livestock sales were held at the pub. It was also popular with workers on the adjacent goods siding, just south of the original location of Poulton-le-Fylde railway station. This station closed in 1896, and a new one opened a short distance away on Breck Road. The sidings were removed in the 1960s, and properties now stand on the site.

It was named Chaplin's Bar between 2003 and 2009, at which point it closed.

The three-storey building was demolished in June 2018, after lying empty for several years. It was replaced by sixteen flats in 2022.

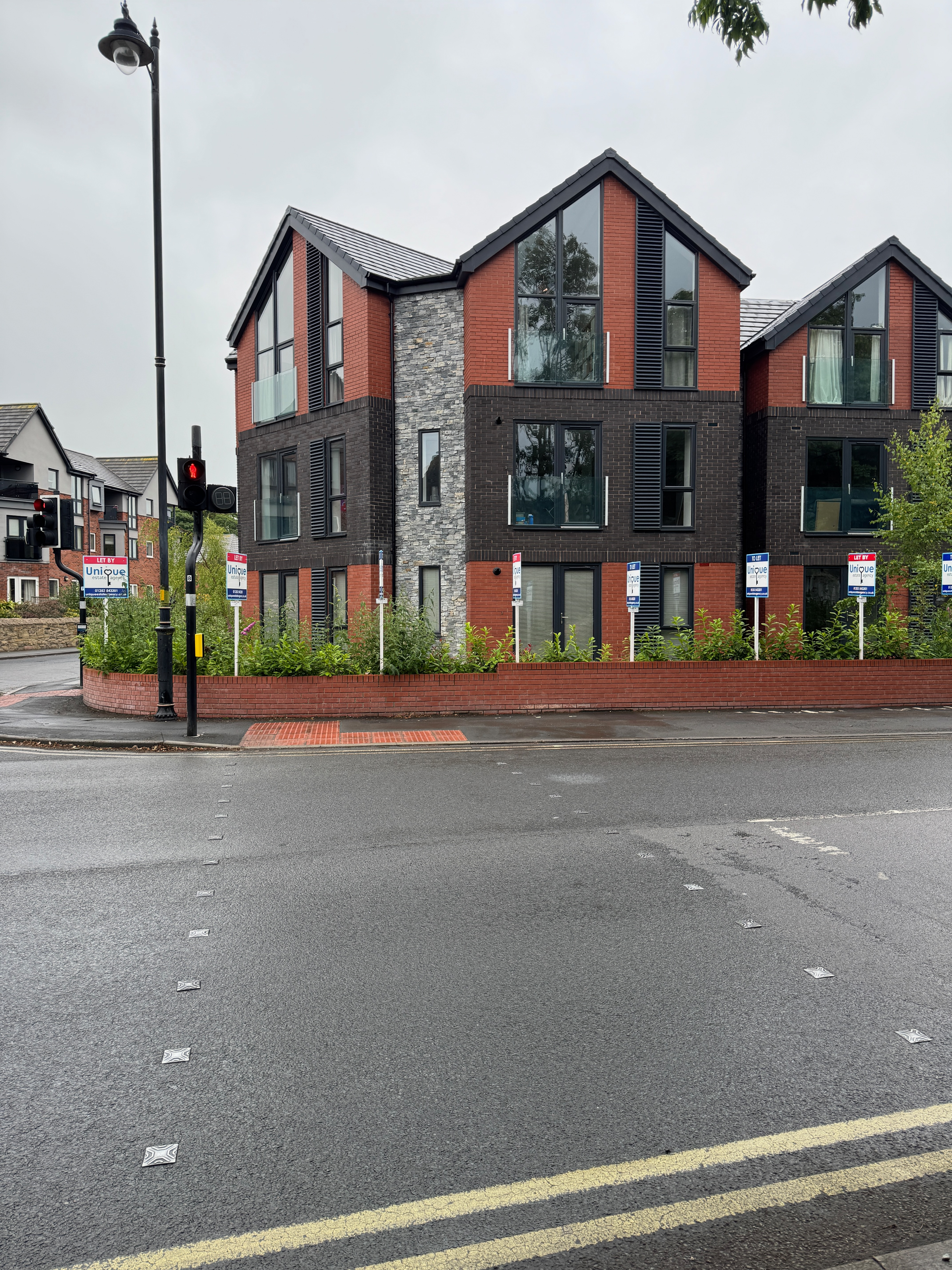
The former site of the hotel, pictured in 2024
