= Thatched House =

Pub in Lancashire, England

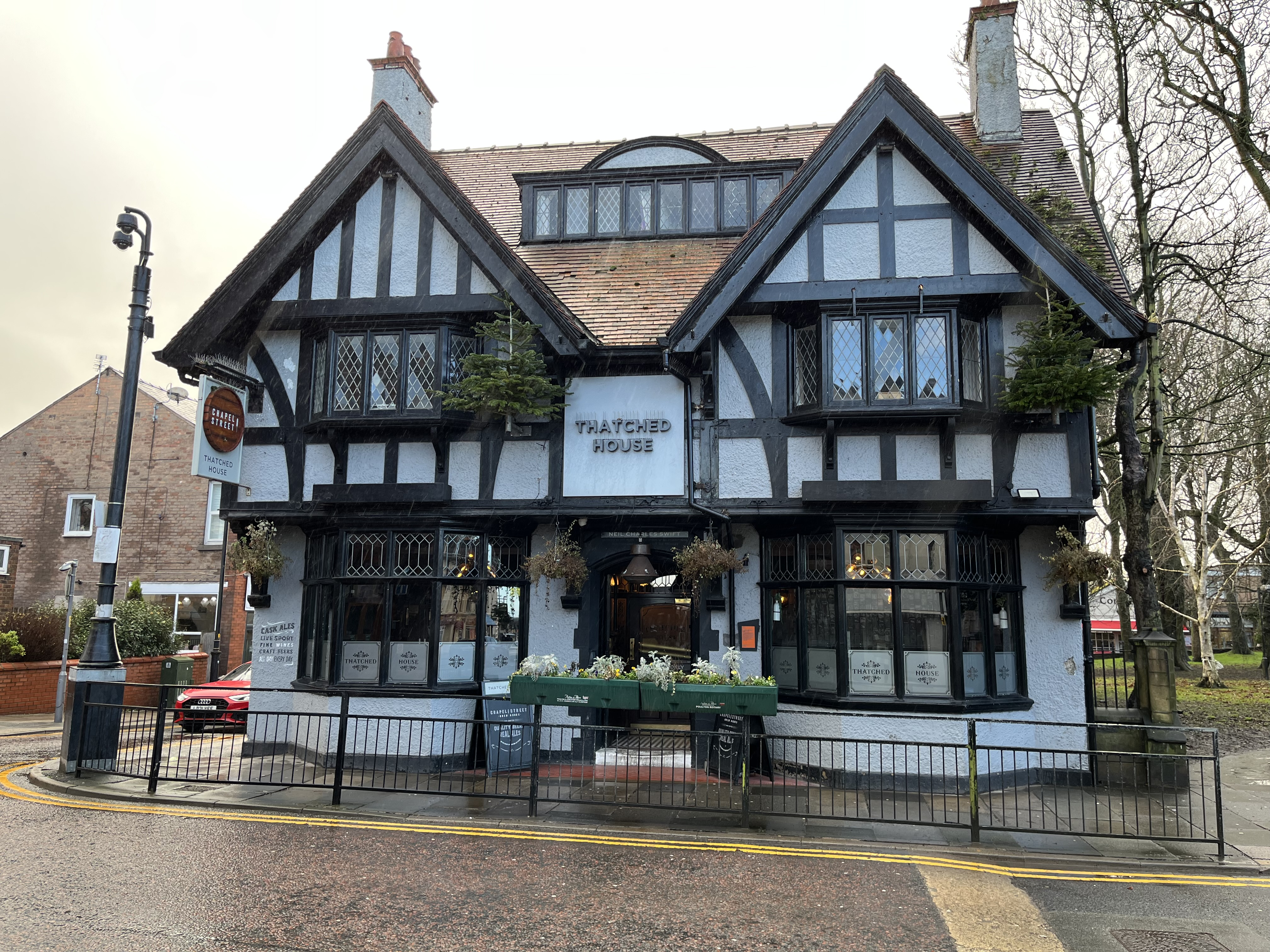
- The building in 2023
- Interactive map of the Thatched House area
- Former names: Green Man

General information
- Type: Public house
- Location: Ball Street, Poulton-le-Fylde, Lancashire, England
- Coordinates: 53.8474401°N 2.991320°W
- Completed: 1907 (119 years ago)
- Owner: Mitchells & Butlers

Technical details
- Floor count: 3

Design and construction
- Awards: 2016 CAMRA Pub of the Year

Website
- www.thethatchedhousepoulton-le-fylde.co.uk#/

The Thatched House is a public house on Ball Street in the English market town of Poulton-le-Fylde, Lancashire. A former coaching inn, it stands adjacent to the churchyard of St Chad's, at the corner of Chapel Street. A tavern, believed to have been called the Green Man, was on the site in 1793, and may have been built in the Middle Ages.

The pub, which is owned by Mitchells & Butlers, was named Campaign for Real Ale's branch Pub of the Year in 2016.

In 2019, the pub was refurbished, including the addition of a roof terrace and an improvement to the pub's Chapel Street Brew House microbrewing facility, which was started in 2014. It is housed in the building's old coaching sheds.

Today's building was completed in 1907, replacing an earlier structure which was oriented facing Chapel Street. Nicholas Charnock was the first landlord of the new construction.

The pub is one of 32 buildings in the town's Conservation Area.

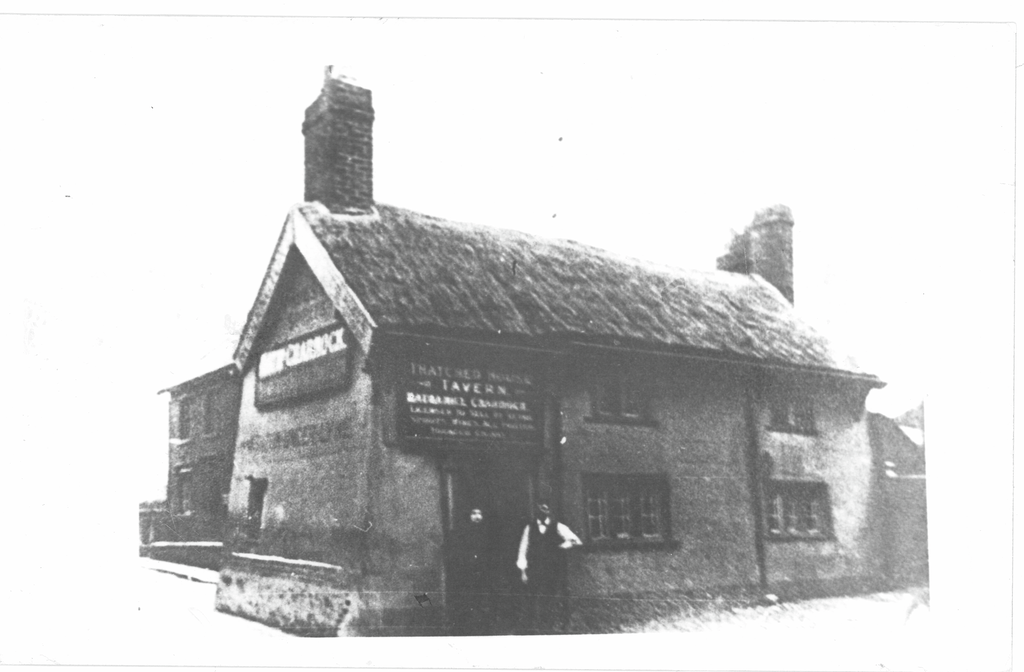
The predecessor to today's structure, named the Thatched House Tavern, pictured around 1880. Landlord Nicholas Charnock is likely the person on the right

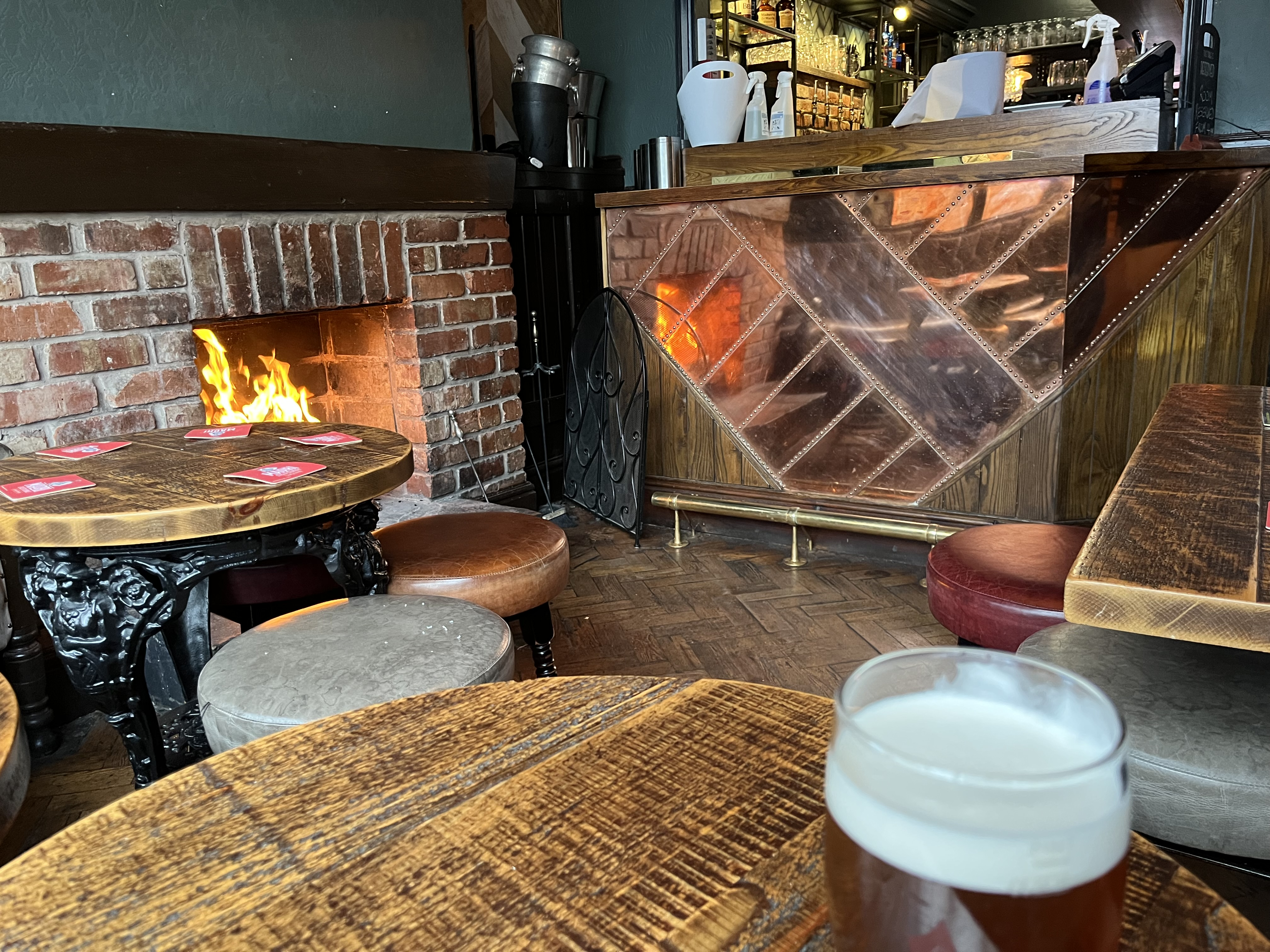
The snug, located at the front left corner of the ground floor

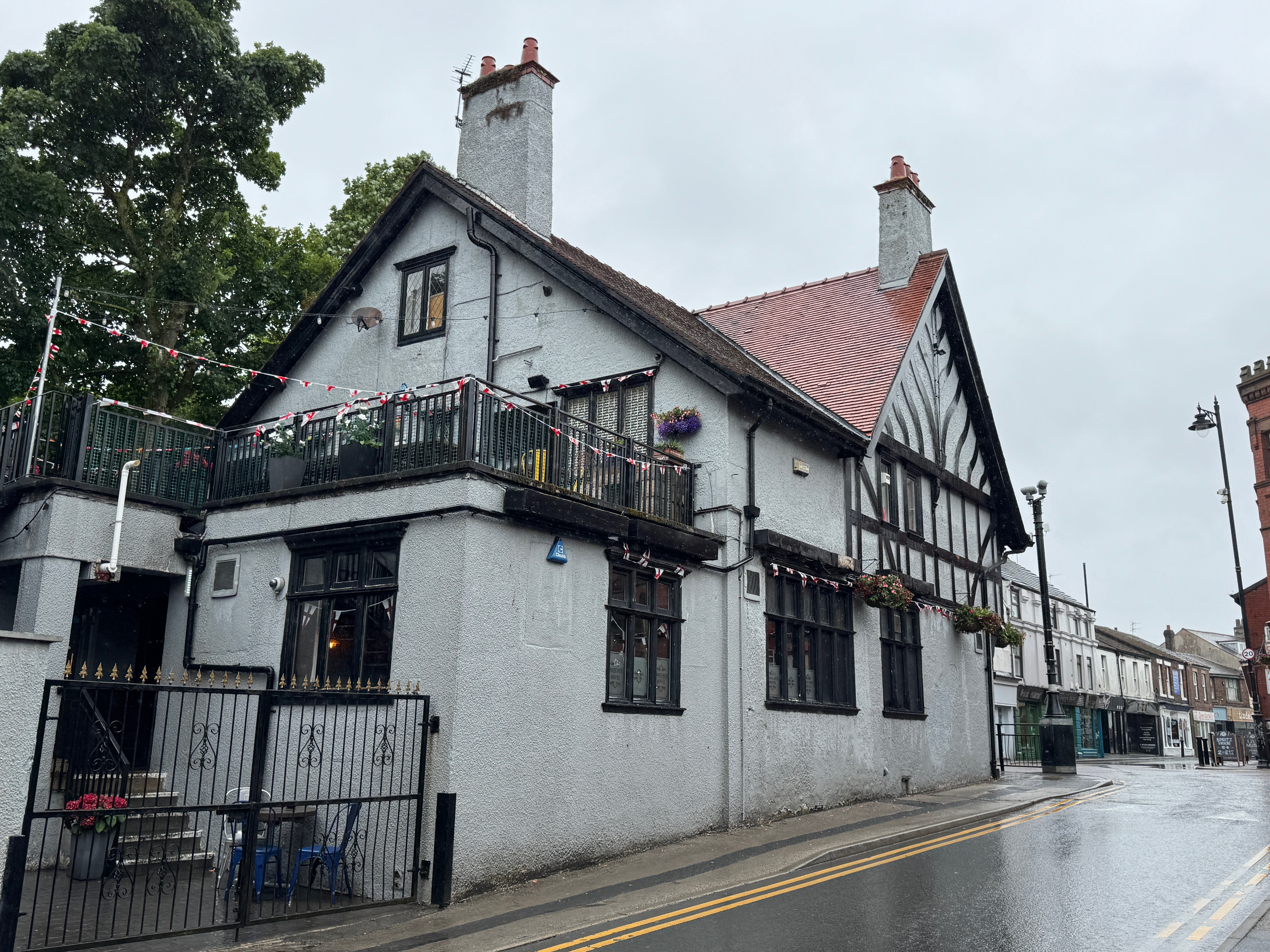
Eastern elevation, on Chapel Street

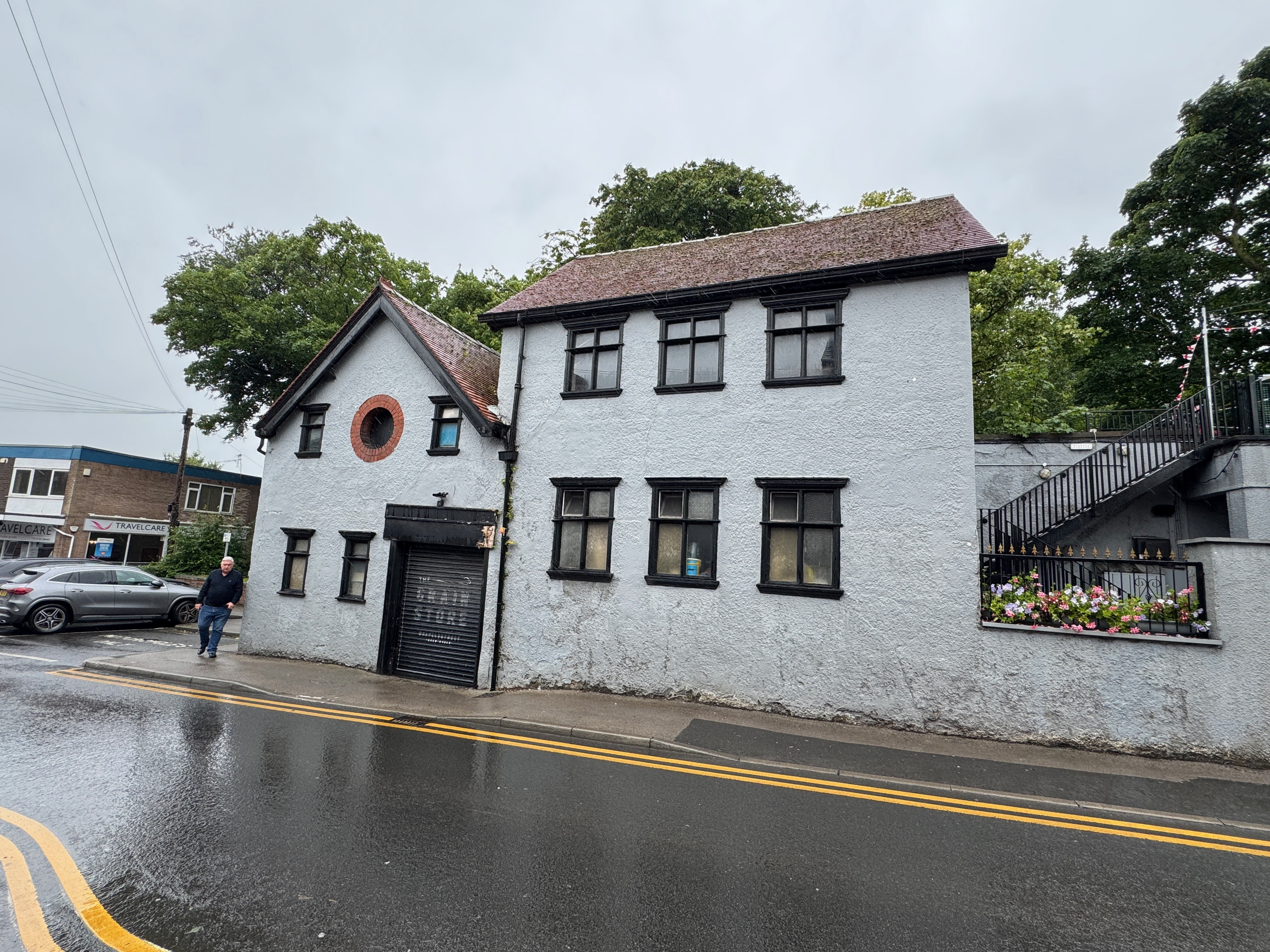
Chapel Street Brew House, viewed from Chapel Street

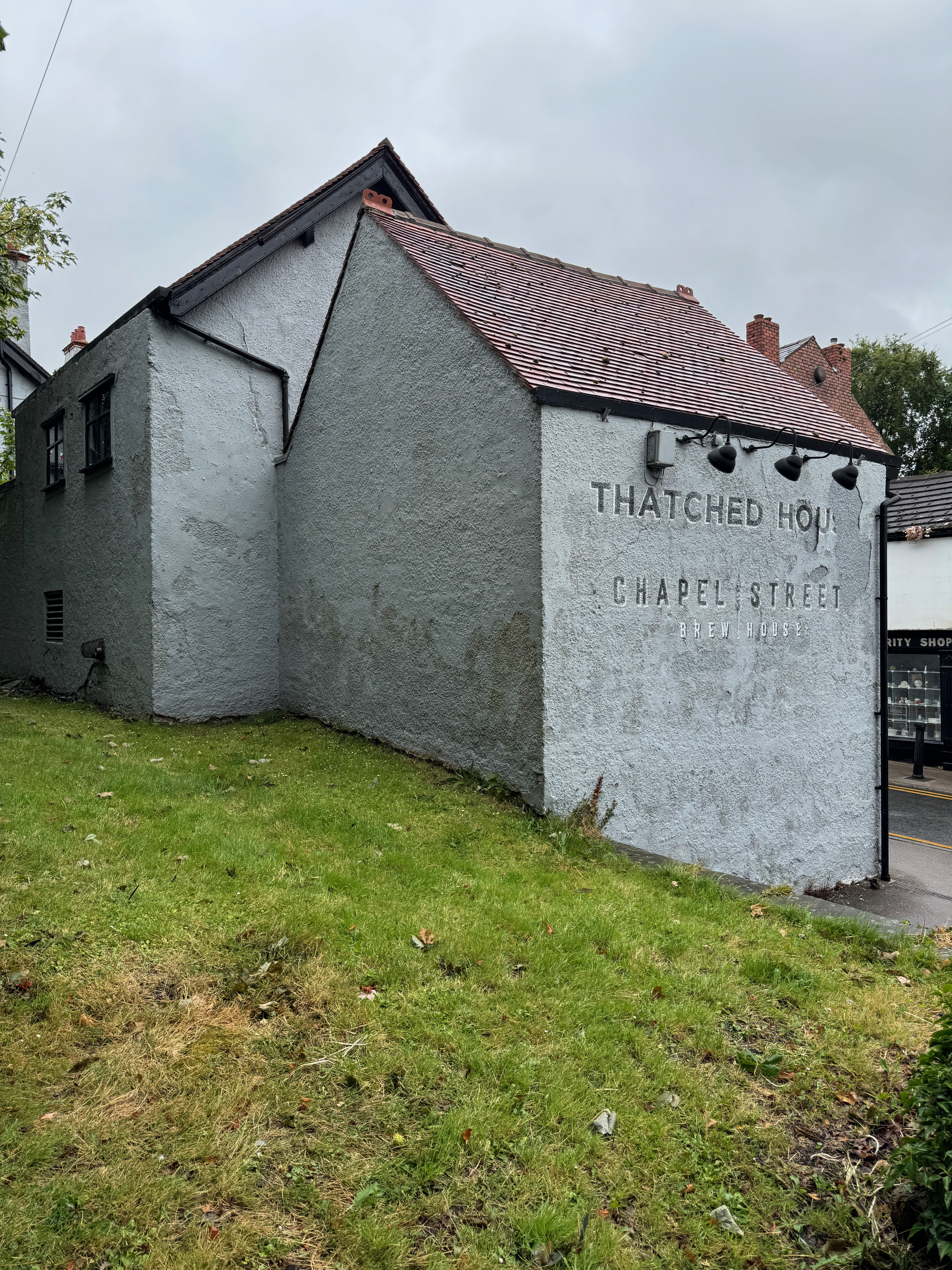
And viewed from the churchyard of St Chad's
