= Transpora Group =

Bus operator in England

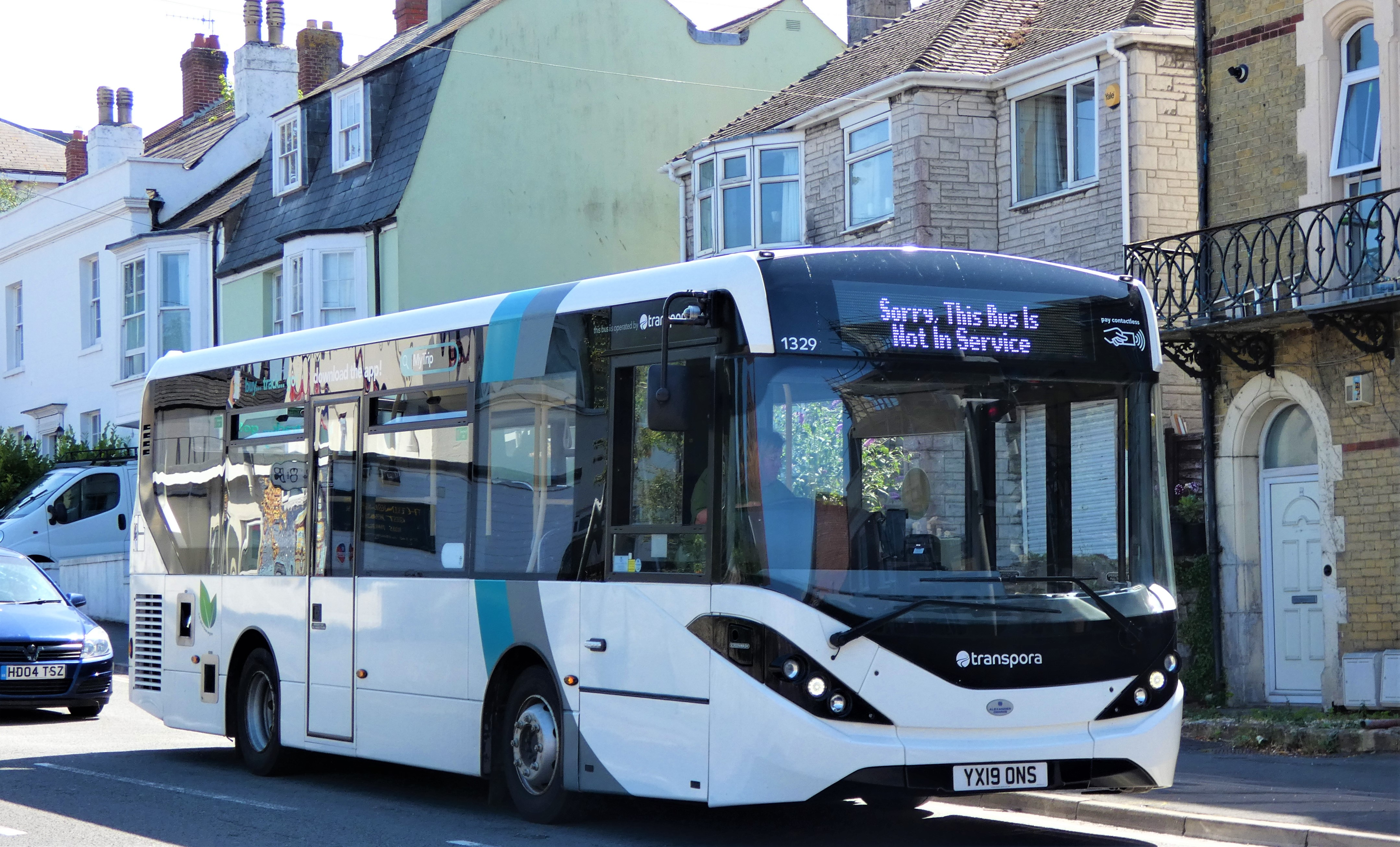
- Alexander Dennis Enviro200 MMC in Weymouth in August 2023
- Industry: Public Transport
- Founded: 30 August 2021
- Headquarters: London, England
- Area served: Lancashire, England
- Key people: Philip Higgs (MD)
- Services: Bus
- Subsidiaries: Transpora North West
- Website: www.transporagroup.co.uk

Transpora Group is a British public transport company, based in Blackpool, England. It primarily operates a mix of bus and coach services.

== History ==
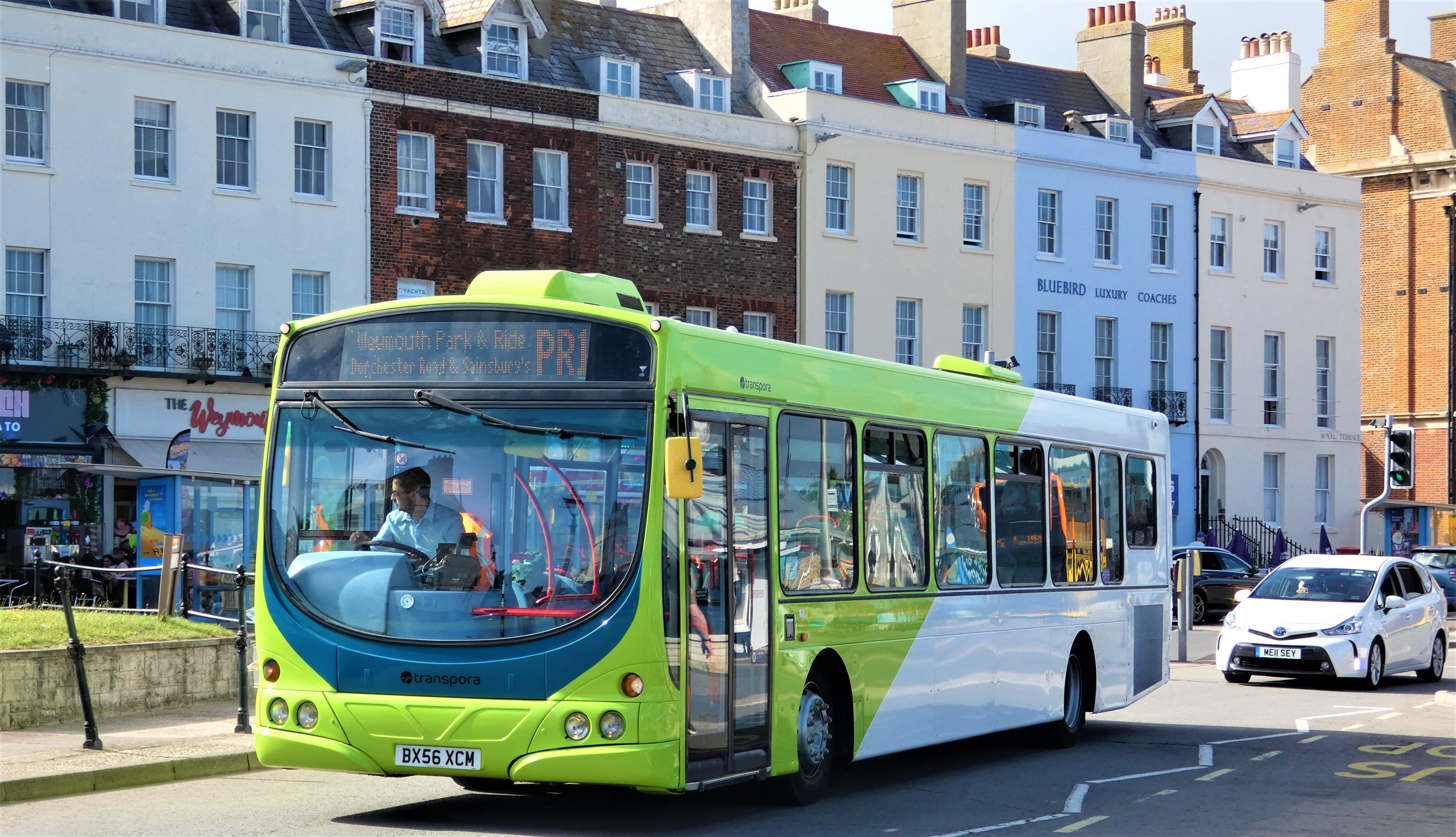
Wright Eclipse Urban bodied Volvo B7RLE on park & ride duty in Weymouth in August 2023

Founded in August 2021, Transpora Group purchased Altonian Coaches of Eastleigh in February 2022. The company began contracted work in September 2022 to cover for the services formerly run by HCT Group in Bristol when it entered into administration. A month later in October, it announced at Showbus it was to begin running a heritage bus service in London using acquired AEC Routemasters on its new Route A between London Waterloo station and Piccadilly Circus under the Londoner Buses brand.

In December 2022, Transpora Group began running service 72 on behalf of the Lancashire County Council. It was originally run as service 20 under Blackpool Transport but was withdrawn citing low passenger numbers and financial losses. In March 2023, the company was awarded four school routes to a number of schools in Poole and Bournemouth, which commenced on 20 March 2023. Two months later, a tour service was launched in Bournemouth using a range of open and closed top buses (the latter of which were originally from the defunct Yellow Buses) under the Bournemouth Coaster brand. This tour service ran between Bournemouth Pier and Hengistbury Head via Boscombe Pier. These five services were cancelled with effect 23 August 2023.

In June 2023, Transpora Group announced they were running a new service connecting Newport, Wales and Bristol, England starting from 3 July 2023. The company was also awarded a park & ride contract in Weymouth to run between July and September 2023 where customers of the P&R site do not pay for parking and only pay for the bus fare.

=== Network withdrawals and Traffic Commissioner rulings ===
In July 2024, Transpora abruptly ceased its operations in Bristol and Gloucestershire. The Big Lemon and Stagecoach West stepped in to take over some services.

On 8 July 2024 Phillip Higgs became the sole director of the company after Rhys Hand, the company's founder, was removed from his position. The Traffic Commissioner held a public inquiry into the company and asked the company's directors to attend. They found one of the company's buses stranded on an unlit A road, more buses in its depot in Poole than were supposed to be, with one of the buses not having the correct operating licences, as well as the sudden cessation of services in Bristol and Gloucestershire which meant bus operators having to scramble to keep them served with buses. The verdict from the traffic commissioner was that Altonian Coaches, who held the operating licence for Transpora's operations in Bristol was to be revoked and fined £8250, and Rhys Hand is disqualified from holding or applying for an operating licence in any area until August 2029.

== Operations ==
Transpora Group operates bus services in Blackpool. It had started to run services in Bristol in 2022 as Transpora South West, but these ceased in 2024 following a breakdown in the relationship between one of its former regional operations managers, Rhys Hand, and the firm's owner Phillip Higgs.

=== Transpora North West ===
Transpora North West
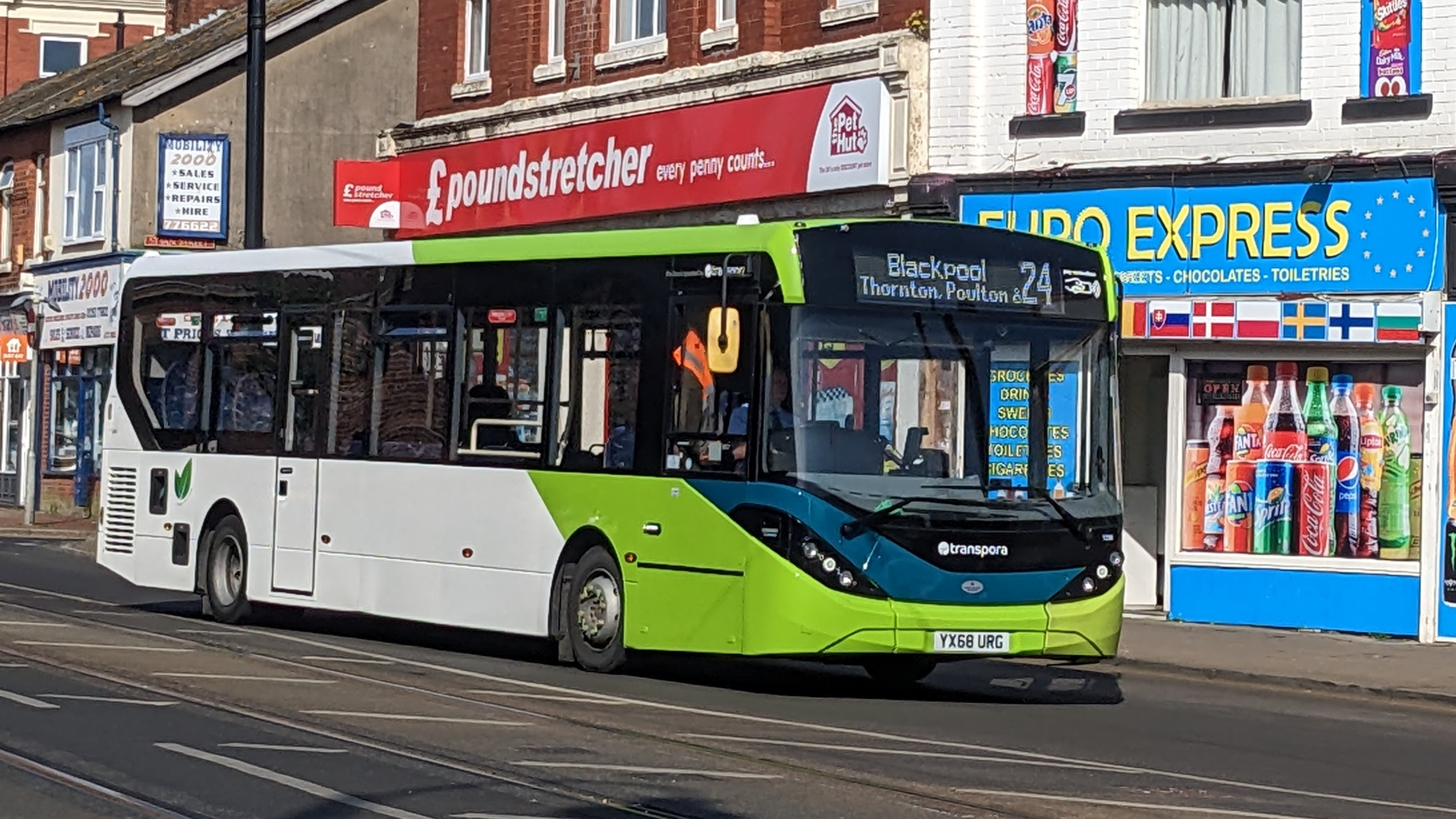
- A Transpora North West Alexander Dennis Enviro200 MMC in Fleetwood in May 2023
Further information
Formerly	Nuttall's Coaches Ltd. Coastliner
Founded	2007 (19 years ago)
Headquarters	Mereside, Blackpool, Lancashire
Locale	Lancashire
Service area	Blackpool; Borough of Fylde; Borough of Wyre
Service type	Bus
Fleet	32 (August 2023)

As Transpora North West, the group operates buses in west Lancashire, England, with eleven bus routes in Blackpool, the Borough of Fylde and the Borough of Wyre. Transpora North West was founded in 2007 as Nuttall's Coaches Ltd., and operated under this name until 2019, when the company was renamed Coastliner Buses. In 2022, Coastliner became part of Transpora Group and was subsequently rebranded to Transpora North West. As of August 2023, Transpora North West had a fleet of 32 buses.

== See also ==
- Public transport in the Fylde
