= James Baines (draper) =

British businessman (1648–1717)

- Born: 6 August 1648; Nether Wyresdale, Lancashire, England
- Died: January 9, 1717 (aged 68)
- Occupations: Draper, philanthropist
- Known for: Baines schools in Lancashire

James Baines (6 August 1648 – 9 January 1717) was an English businessman. He was a woollen-draper and philanthropist.

== Life ==
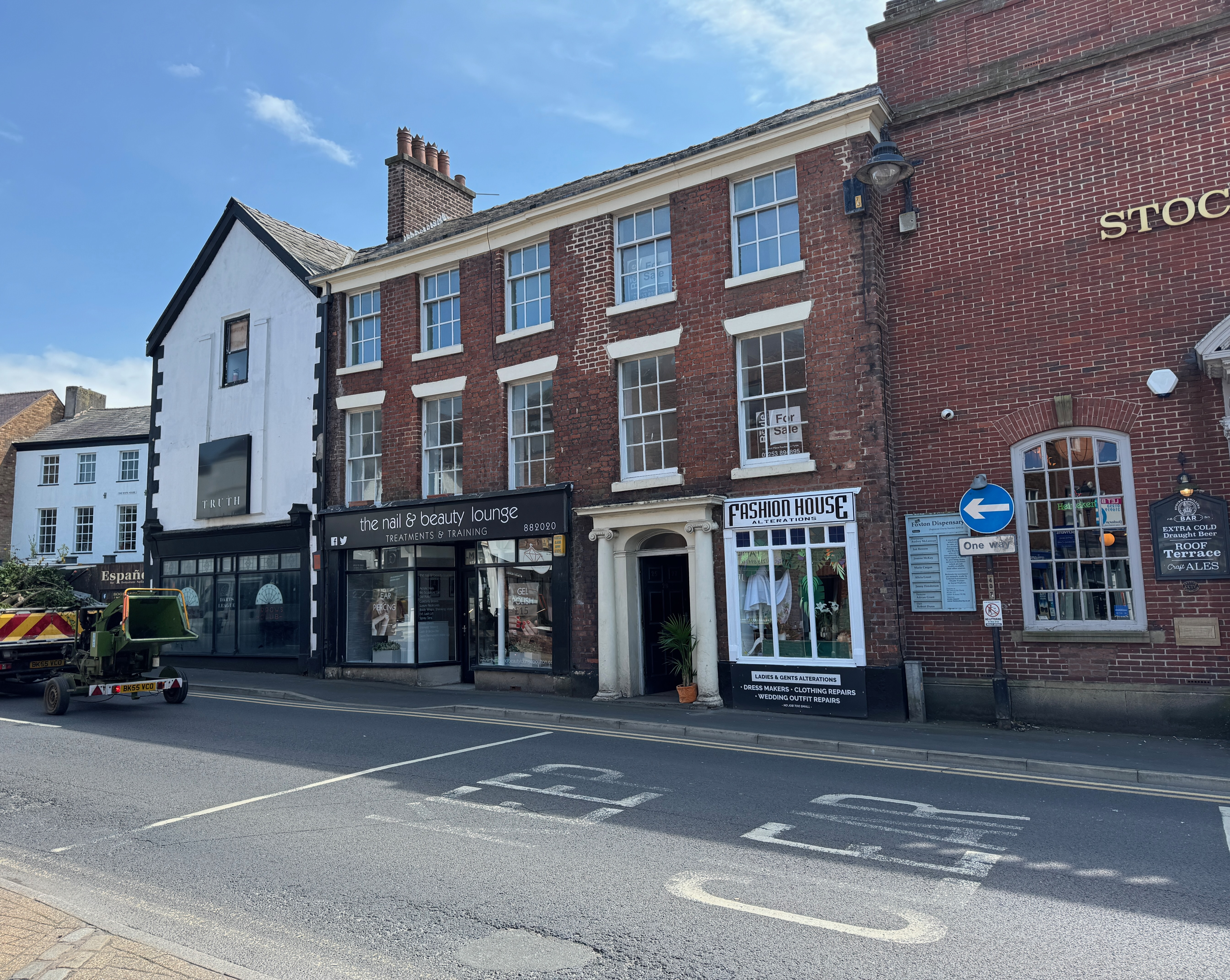
Baines's drapery was located where the white building stands at today's 33 Market Place in Poulton-le-Fylde

Baines was born at Berkenhead Farm in Nether Wyresdale, Lancashire, in 1648. He moved to Poulton-le-Fylde to become a woollen-draper. His shop was located at the corner of today's Blackpool Old Road and Queen's Square, overlooking the town's Market Place.

He bought land in Lancashire on which three schools were built. Baines School in Poulton-le-Fylde, Baines Endowed Primary School in Thornton and Baines Endowed Primary School in Marton are still in operation.

On 9 January 2017, the tricentenary of Baines's death, children from the Marton school buried a time capsule at the approximate location of the first Baines school.

== Death ==
Baines died in 1717, aged 68. He was buried in Marton.
