= 2 Market Place =

Building in Poulton-le-Fylde, Lancashire, England

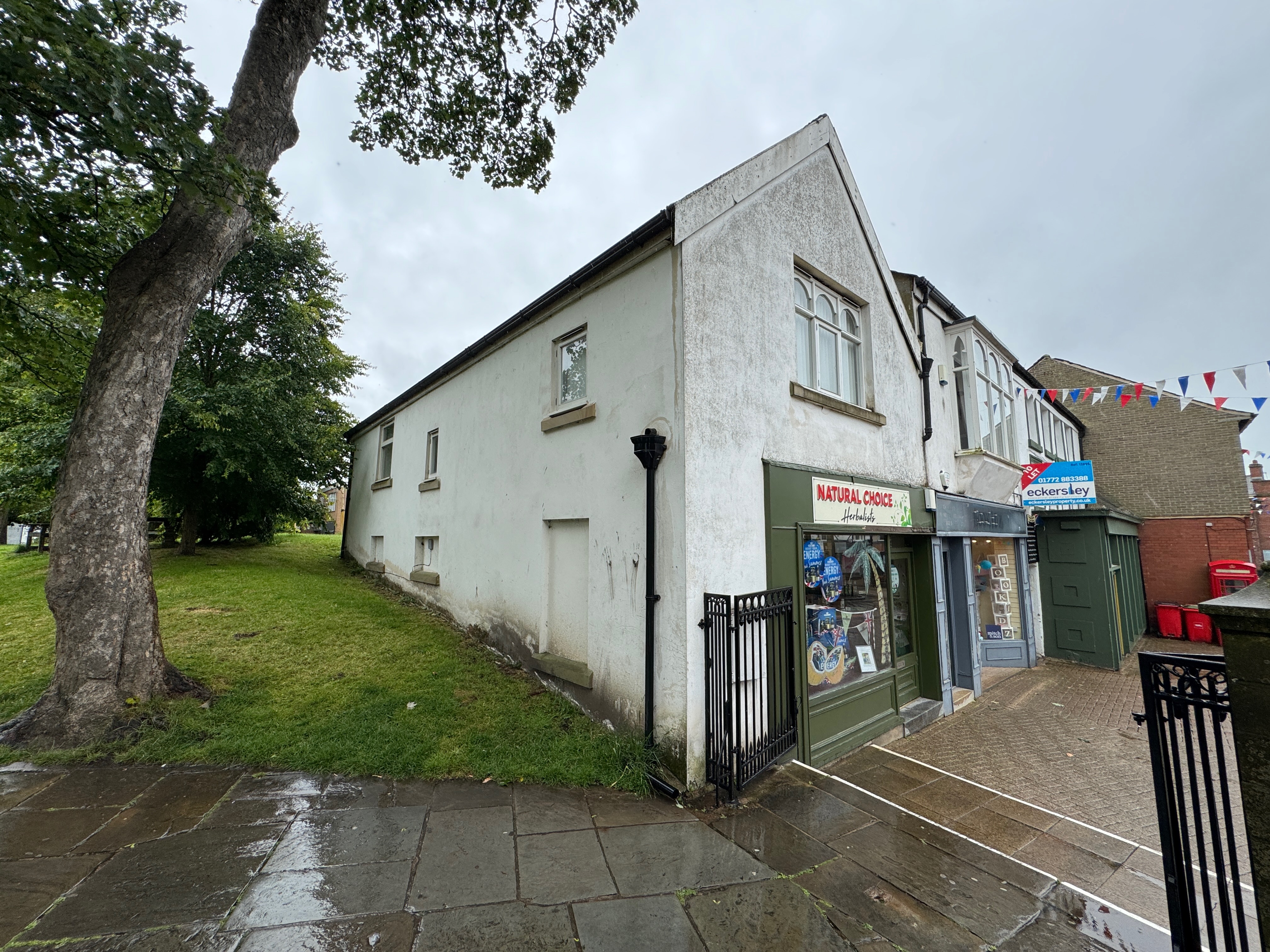
- The building in 2024, viewed from the churchyard of St Chad's Church

- Location in Wyre Borough Location in Lancashire
- 53.846945°N 2.992272°W
- Location: Market Place, Poulton-le-Fylde, Lancashire, England

History
- Built: c. 1800 (226 years ago)

Site notes
- Area: Borough of Wyre

Listed Building – Grade II
- Designated: 16 August 1983
- Reference no.: 1204609

2 Market Place is a Grade II listed building in the English market town of Poulton-le-Fylde, Lancashire. Built in the late 17th or early 18th century, it stands immediately to the south of St Chad's Church, itself Grade II* listed and dating to the 17th century, in the northeastern corner of Market Place. It was formerly a custom house, later a residence.

It is constructed of rendered brick with a slate roof. It is built on two storeys and originally had three bays. In the loft there is visible heavy timber framing including a roof truss between the second and third bays. The building now functions as a shop.

The building's southern facade forms part of the entrance to the narrow The Mews and Chapel Street Court (formerly Potts Alley) alley of shops and businesses which connects to Chapel Street.

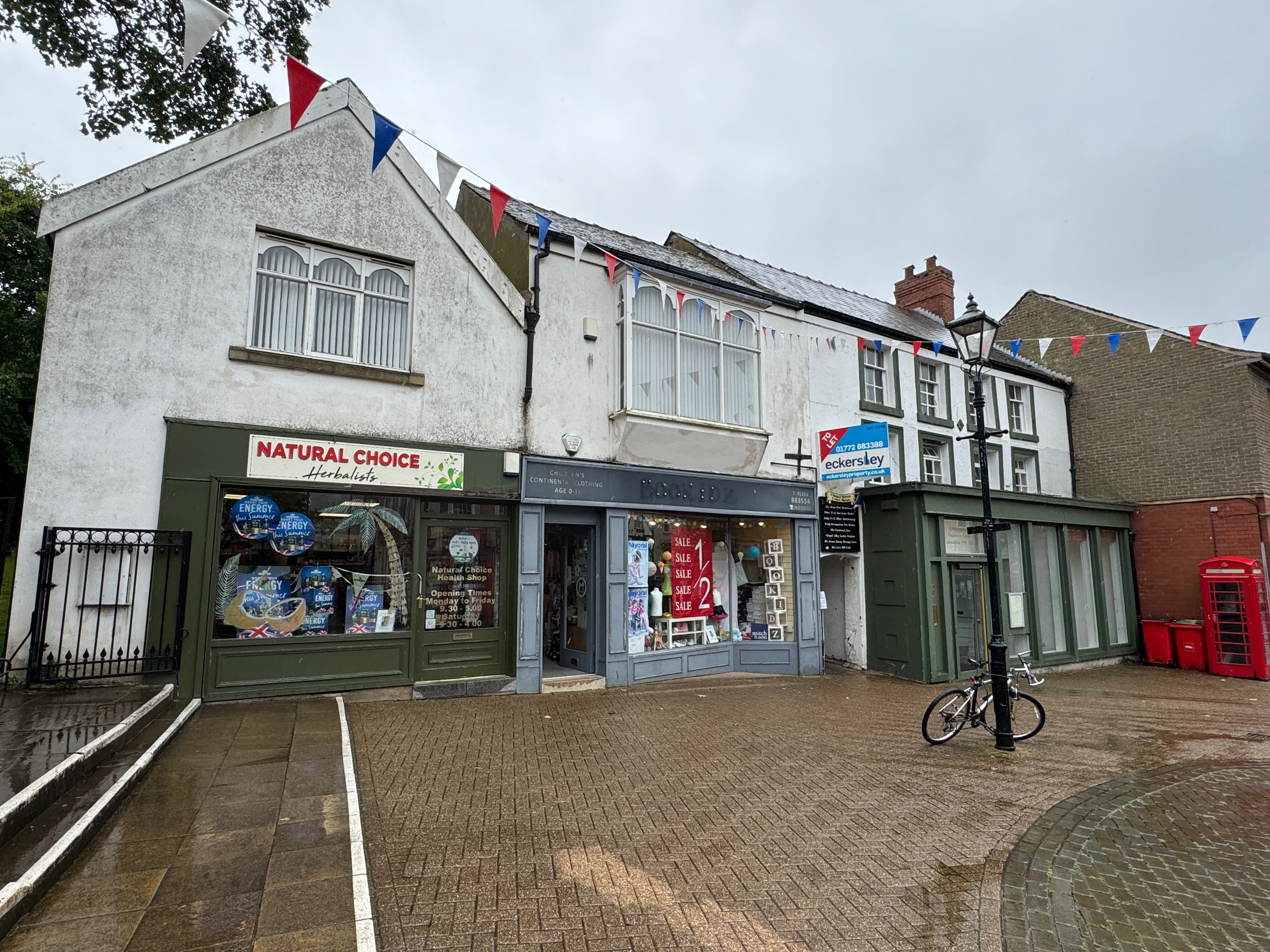
The western gable end of the building (left) in 2024

== See also ==
- Listed buildings in Poulton-le-Fylde
