= Listed buildings in Poulton-le-Fylde =

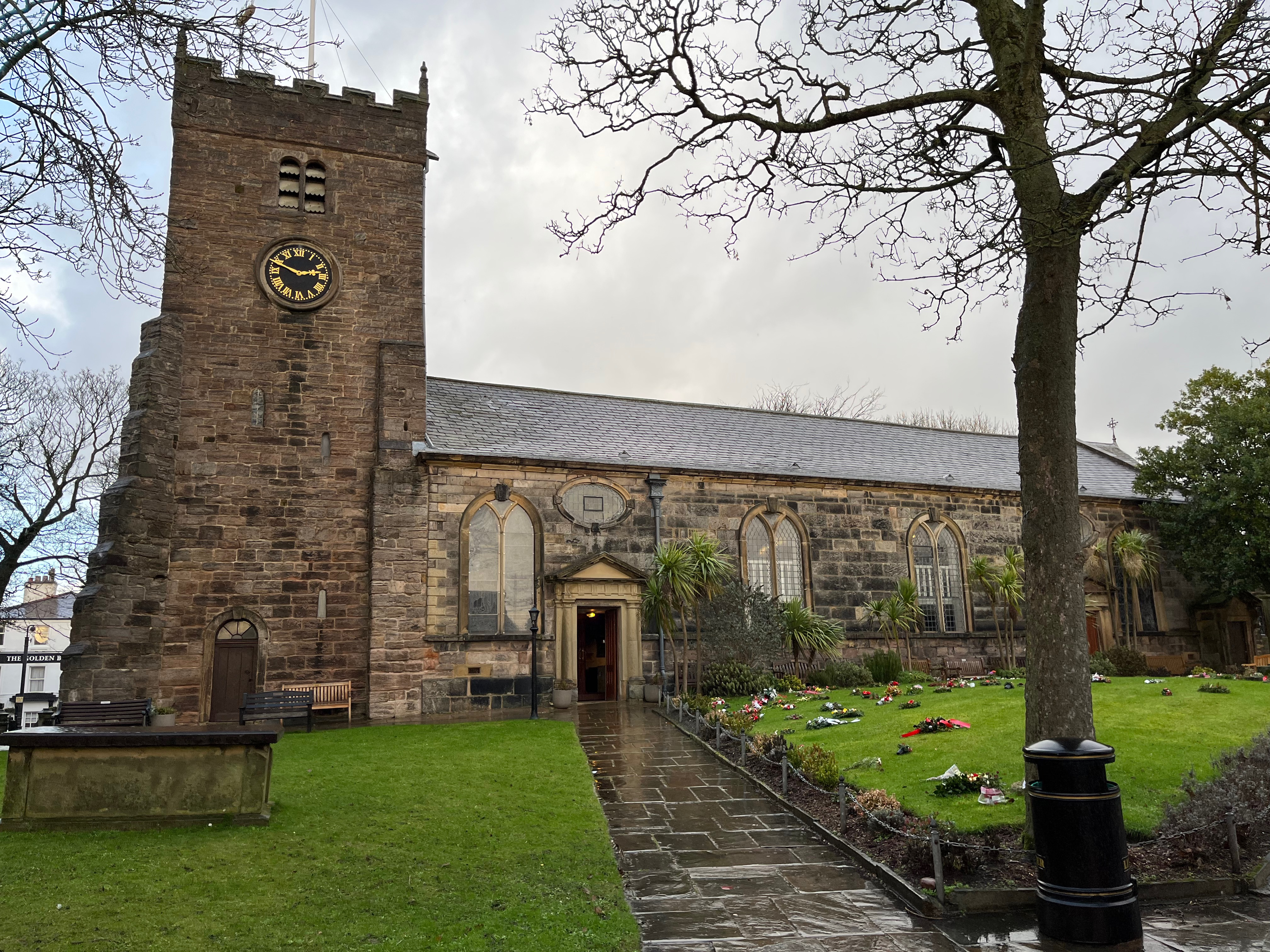
St Chad's Church, listed Grade II*

Poulton-le-Fylde is a market town in the Wyre district of Lancashire, England, situated on a coastal plain called the Fylde. There are 16 buildings and structures in the town which have been listed by the Secretary of State for Culture, Olympics, Media and Sport as being of special architectural, historical or cultural significance. One is classified as Grade II*, and the rest as Grade II; Poulton-le-Fylde has no Grade I listed buildings. The Grade II* designation is for St Chad's Church. There is written evidence of a church on the site since 1094, although it may have been built earlier. It became the Anglican parish church at the time of the Reformation and was largely rebuilt in the 18th century.

Of the remaining listed buildings and structures, nine are in or very close to Market Place in the centre of town. They include three former houses (all now shops), a former bank, a telephone kiosk and four stone market place structures. Three cottages, a house and the former Roman Catholic Chapel of St John, are situated within two miles of the town centre. The ages of the listed buildings and structures range from the market cross, probably built in the 17th century, to the telephone kiosk, built in the 1930s.

In the United Kingdom, the term "listed building" refers to a building or other structure officially designated as being of special architectural, historical or cultural significance. These buildings are in three grades: Grade I consists of buildings of outstanding architectural or historical interest; Grade II* includes particularly significant buildings of more than local interest; Grade II consists of buildings of special architectural or historical interest. Buildings in England are listed on recommendations provided by English Heritage, which also determines the grading.

== Listed buildings and structures ==
Explanation of the listed building grades
Grade	Criteria
Grade II*	Particularly important buildings of more than special interest
Grade II	Buildings of national importance and special interest

List of the buildings and structures
Name and location	Photograph	Grade	Date	Description
St Chad's Church; 53.8472°N 2.9921°W	A stone church seen from the south-east with a square, battlemented tower to the left. Part of the body of the church can be seen extending to the right.	II*	17th century	The current building dates mostly from 1753 and replaced an earlier church on the site. It is constructed of stone with a slate roof. The tower to the west was built in the early 17th century of roughly dressed stone. It has two diagonal buttresses, two angled buttresses and four corner pinnacles that were added in 1923. There are belfry louvres on each side of the tower. The church has large, arched windows with Y-tracery and oval windows which were placed above the doors in the 19th century. A round Norman-style apse was added in 1868.
1 Vicarage Road; 53.8474°N 2.9910°W	A rectangular, red-brick building, seen from the north-west, at the corner of two streets. Signs on the two visible walls read "Butson & Blofeld".	II	1839	This building, now a shop, was originally Poulton Savings Bank, built in 1839. It is symmetrical, constructed of brick with stone dressings and a concrete tile roof. The front entrance is a stone doorway with a depressed-arch head and a radiating fanlight. The building is of two storeys. At the front there are two sash windows on the ground floor and three on the first, each with a stone windowsill and hood mould. There are a further two windows on each end. The right gable (looking from the front) has a stone plaque which is inscribed with "Poulton Savings Bank 1839".
2 Market Place; 53.8469°N 2.9922°W	A white, rendered brick building with a dark slate roof, seen from the north. The visible windows on the ground floor are blocked up.	II	Late 17th – early 18th century	This former house in the market place dates from the late 17th century or early 18th century. It is constructed of rendered brick with a slate roof. It is built on two storeys and originally had three bays. In the loft there is visible heavy timber framing including a roof truss between the second and third bays. The building, which is next to the churchyard, now functions as a shop.
4, 6 and 10 Queen Square; 53.8462°N 2.9918°W	A white, rendered brick building on three storeys, in a terrace, seen from the north. The lower floor of the building is covered by shop fronts.	II	Mid-18th century	This town house was built in the mid-18th century. It is constructed of rendered brick with a cornice gutter and a slate roof. It is on a double-pile plan with three storeys. It has five bays and the first-floor casement windows are tall with glazing bars; the second-floor windows are smaller. The front entrance to the building is flanked by Doric pilasters. Early home of Harry Viener.
25, 27, 29 and 31 Market Place; 53.8462°N 2.9923°W	A red brick town house, in a terrace, seen from the north. A shop sign stretches across half the building and reads "D.E.M. Thomson".	II	Late 18th – early 19th century	This former house was built in the late 18th century or early 19th century and was owned by James Baines, a woollen merchant. It is constructed of brick in a Flemish bond pattern with stone dressings, a slate roof and red ridging tiles. It has a double-pile plan with five bays and five storeys. Its fourth bay doorcase is flanked by Ionic columns with a plain frieze and cornice. The first floor has sash windows with stone sills and splayed stone heads. Inside there is a dog-leg staircase which has a moulded handrail and pillar newels with panelling. The staircase probably dates from the late 17th century, when it was the home of Alexander Rigby.
St John's Chapel; 53.8523°N 2.9849°W	A cream, rendered brick building seen from the south, with dark slate roofs. The right third of the building (looking from the front) is on two storeys, and the remainder is on one.	II	1813	This former Roman Catholic Chapel of St John and attached presbytery date from 1813. The building is constructed of brick and has a slate hipped roof. The brickwork is now rendered. The chapel is on one storey and has arched windows with timber Y-tracery. The presbytery end has two storeys, with three bays and rectangular sash windows. The chapel was replaced in 1912 by a larger church a few metres to the south-west.
End Cottage and Old Farm; 53.8485°N 2.9775°W	A white brick house at the end of a terrace, partly hidden from view by foliage.	II	1723	The cottage and farmhouse were originally one property, built in 1723. The two-storey building is constructed of whitewashed brick with a slate roof and originally had three bays with a baffle entry. There is a gable-end chimney stack on the left side of the first bay (looking from the front), and an axial chimney stack between the other two bays. Each floor has two casement windows with arched brick heads and wooden shutters.
Fish Stones; 53.8464°N 2.9924°W	Two rectangular stone slabs on stone legs.	II	Probably 18th century	The fish stones are probably from the 18th century. They are two slabs raised on legs, constructed of stone. They were used by market traders selling fish. They are placed in a line with the stocks, market cross, whipping post and war memorial.
Fox's Farmhouse; 53.8292°N 2.9851°W	A white, rendered brick house, with a dark, slate roof. It is partly hidden from view by foliage.	II	Probably early 18th century	This farmhouse probably dates from the early 18th century. It is constructed of rendered brick with stone quoins. Its roof is of slate with four courses of stone slate. It has three bays with a baffle entry and is on two storeys. There is a gable-end chimney stack to the right (looking from the front), and an axial chimney stack between the second and third bays. There are sash windows with stone sills, and a gabled porch.
K6 Telephone Kiosk; 53.8468°N 2.9923°W	A red, cast iron telephone kiosk with a domed roof. it stands against a red brick wall at the corner of a building.	II	c. 1935	This K6 telephone box was designed in 1935 by Giles Gilbert Scott. It is constructed of cast iron and is painted red. It has a domed roof. The K6 kiosks were designed by Scott to commemorate the Silver Jubilee of George V.
The Manor; 53.8513°N 2.9826°W	A red brick house, at the end of a long drive, seen from the south. Prominent is a gable with black and white striped pebbledash.	II	1895	This house was built in 1895. It is constructed of Accrington brick with red tile roofs and has pebbledash in its gables. Designed in the Vernacular Revival style, it has a rectangular plan and is of two and a half storeys. Inside, the house is designed in the Jacobean style, decorated with stained glass windows, murals and a panelled ceiling. In the main hall, a large Imperial staircase leads to a gallery surrounded by a balustrade. It was originally the home of Benjamin Sykes of the architectural firm Garlick, Park and Sykes, and was probably designed by him.
Market Cross; 53.8464°N 2.9924°W	A stone cross on a stepped plinth. It sits on paved ground, with red brick shops behind it.	II	Probably 17th century	The market cross probably dates from the 17th century. It is a Tuscan column constructed of stone, consisting of three tapered cylinders on a square pedestal, which in turn sits on a circular plinth of four steps. On top of the cylinders is a ball finial with a cross. The cross is similar to those at Kirkland and Garstang and is situated between the stocks and the fish stones.
The Old Cottage; 53.8289°N 2.9830°W	A white, rendered brick house with a dark slate roof, partly obscured by dense foliage.	II	18th century	This is probably an 18th-century reconstruction of a 17th-century house. It was renovated and extended in 1975. Constructed of rendered brick with a slate roof, it is a two-storey building with a cross-passage plan and three bays. Each bay has two casement windows, one on each floor.
Stocks; 53.8464°N 2.9924°W	Stocks, made from central dark wooden stock beams with two holes in. The beams are supported by stone pillars. They have flowers planted in front of them, and the market cross, also with flowers, sits behind.	II	Probably 18th century	The stocks, probably from the 18th century, consist of two short, stone pillars with a pair of wooden stock beams. The beams, which have been replaced several times, contain two pairs of leg-holes. They are situated next to the market cross, in line with the fish stones, whipping post and war memorial.
Whipping Post; 53.8465°N 2.9924°W	Stone whipping post on paved ground, with shops in the background.	II	Probably 18th century	This whipping post, probably from the 18th century, is constructed of stone and has a square cornice and ball finial. It is situated in line with the stocks, market cross, fish stones and war memorial.
War Memorial; 53.84675°N 2.99248°W	Stone column with a cross at the top.	II	1921	The war memorial at the north end of the Market Place is in granite and stands in a small cobbled area. It consists of a pillar with an octagonal foot, and a ball finial surmounted by a wheel-head cross. The pillar is on a square plinth on an octagonal step. On the plinth is a timber plaque with a coat of arms, a bronze plaque with an inscription, and further plaques recording the names of those lost in the World Wars and another conflict.
