= Old Town Hall, Poulton-le-Fylde =

Municipal building in Poulton-le-Fylde, Lancashire, England

Old Town Hall
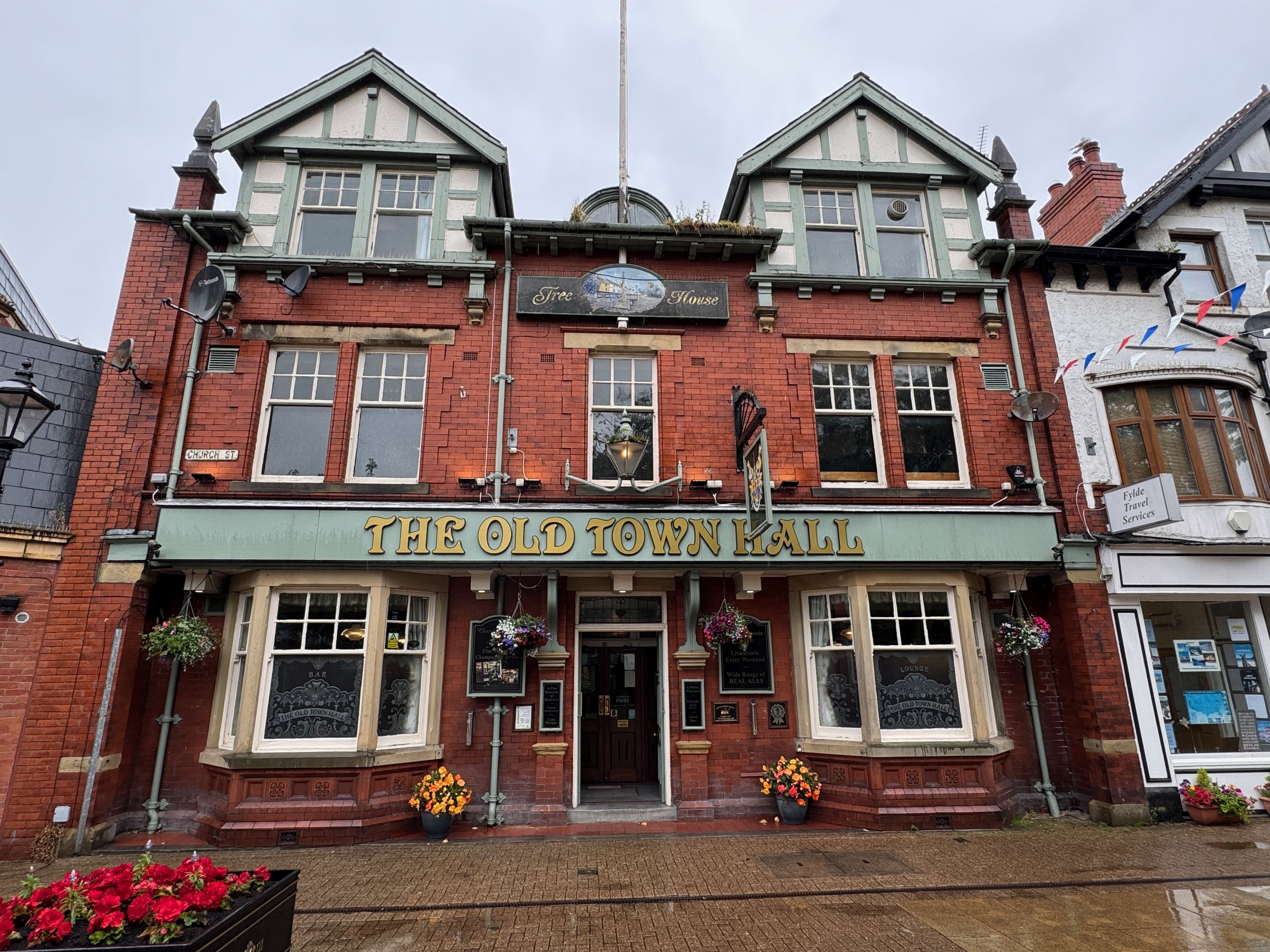
- The building in 2024

- Shown in Lancashire Old Town Hall, Poulton-le-Fylde (Lancashire) Old Town Hall, Poulton-le-Fylde (England)
- 53.8472°N 2.993°W
- Location: Church Street, Poulton-le-Fylde, Lancashire

History
- Built: 1910 (116 years ago)

Site notes
- Architectural style: Victorian style

The Old Town Hall is a building on Church Street in the market town of Poulton-le-Fylde in Lancashire, England. Located to the north of Market Place, the building was originally a public house before becoming a municipal building and then reverting to use as a public house.

== History ==
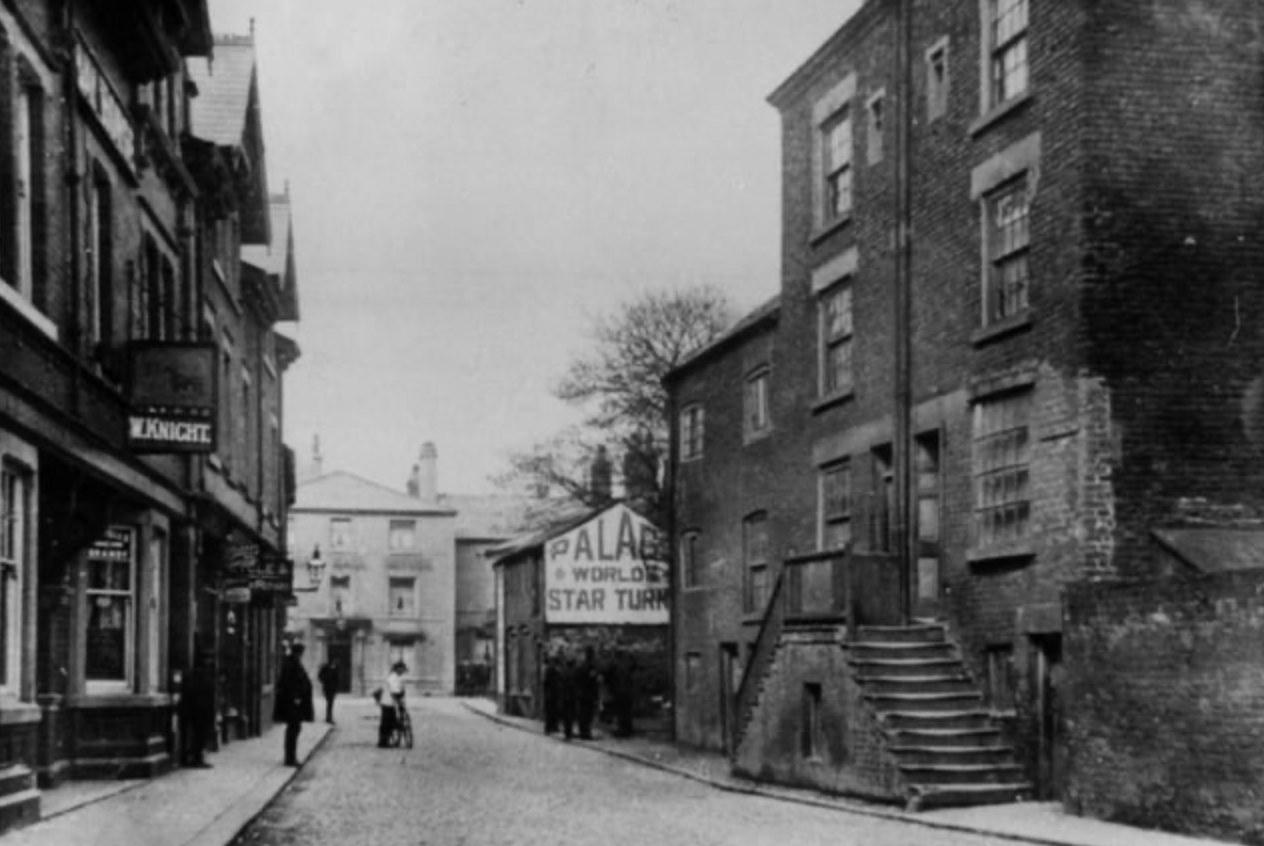
Church Street in the early 1900s. The Bay Horse Inn is in view on the left

The first municipal building in the town, known as the Moot Hall, stood at the southern end of the adjacent Market Place, just in front of the market cross, in late medieval times. Following significant population growth, particularly after the harbours at Wardleys and Skippool on the River Wyre were developed, the area became an urban district in 1900. The new civic leaders originally held their meetings in a variety of places, but after finding this arrangement unsatisfactory, they decided to establish a dedicated meeting place. The site they selected had originally been developed as the Bay Horse Inn in 1869.

The Bay Horse Inn had been rebuilt in redbrick with stone dressings, to a Victorian style design, in 1910, seemingly dropping the inn part of the name, around that time. The design involved a symmetrical main frontage of three bays facing onto Church Street. The ground floor was slightly recessed in relation to the upper floors and featured a central doorway which was flanked by pilasters surmounted by brackets supporting the upper floors of the building. The central bay was fenestrated by a single casement window on the first floor and a small Diocletian window at attic level. The outer bays were fenestrated by bay windows with stone surrounds on the ground floor and by pairs of casement windows on the upper floors; the outer bays were surmounted Tudor-style half-timbered gables. The council acquired the building in 1927 and converted the interior for use as council offices at that time.

A butcher's shop adjoined the building to the left, at the corner of what was Burlington Avenue. Both were demolished in 1970 with the construction of the Teanlowe Centre shopping precinct.

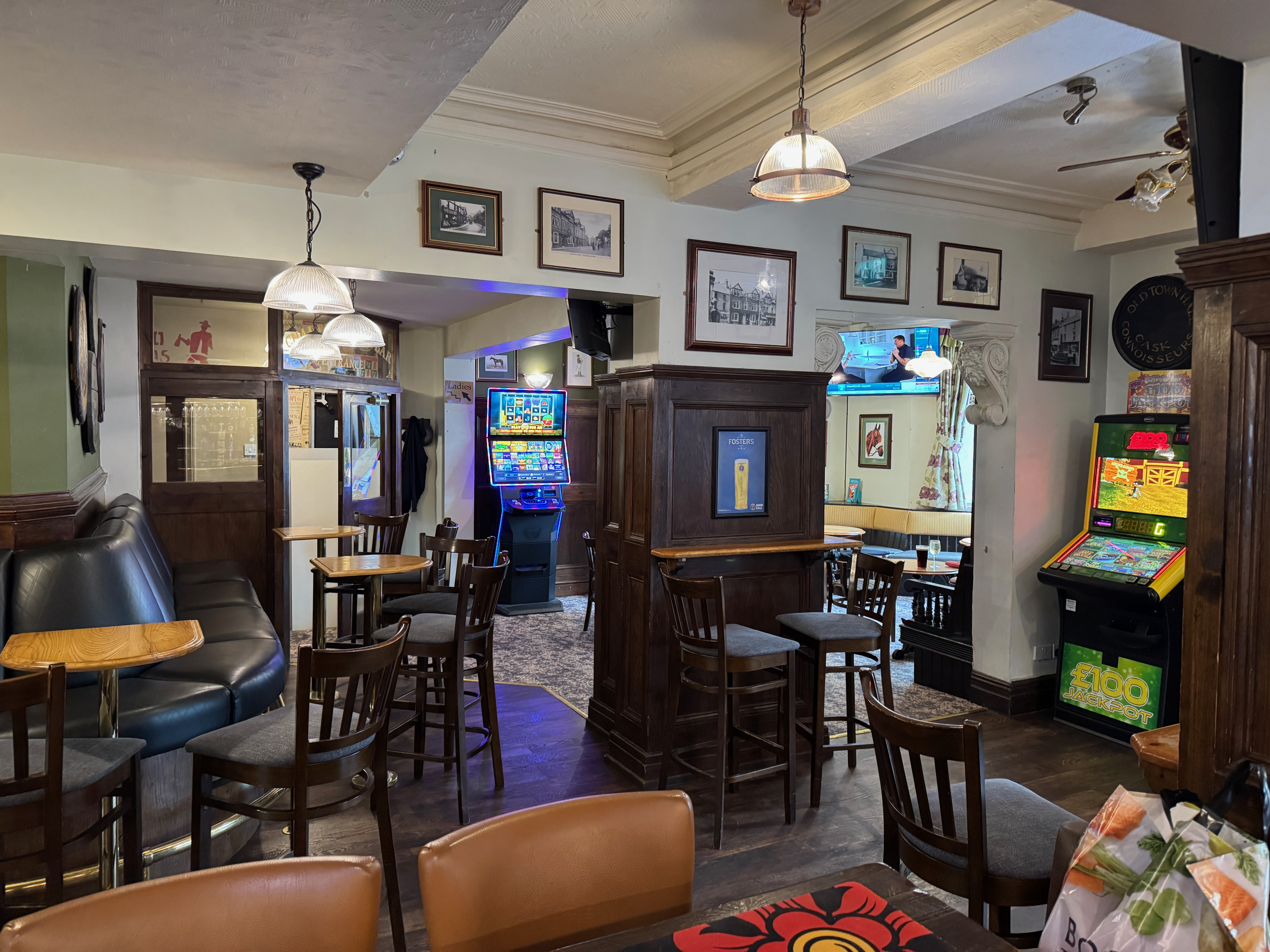
Interior view, main entrance on the right (2024)

The building continued to serve as the headquarters of Poulton-le-Fylde Urban District Council for much of the 20th century, and then briefly served as the meeting place of the enlarged Wyre Borough Council after its 1974 formation; however, the building ceased to be the local seat of government in 1988, when the council relocated to the former Poulton Teacher Training College in Breck Road, which was converted for use as Wyre Civic Centre. The building in Church Street was converted back to its former use, as a public house, and was renamed the "Old Town Hall" at that time. It was extensively refurbished in 2012.

In 2008, Wyre Council's Poulton-le-Fylde Conservation Area Appraisal included the property for its historic value, but stated that, due to the many alterations made to it over time, it was unlikely that listed status would be achieved.
