= Church of St John the Evangelist, Poulton-le-Fylde =

Coordinates: 53.8523°N 2.9849°W

St John's Church
- Church of St John the Evangelist
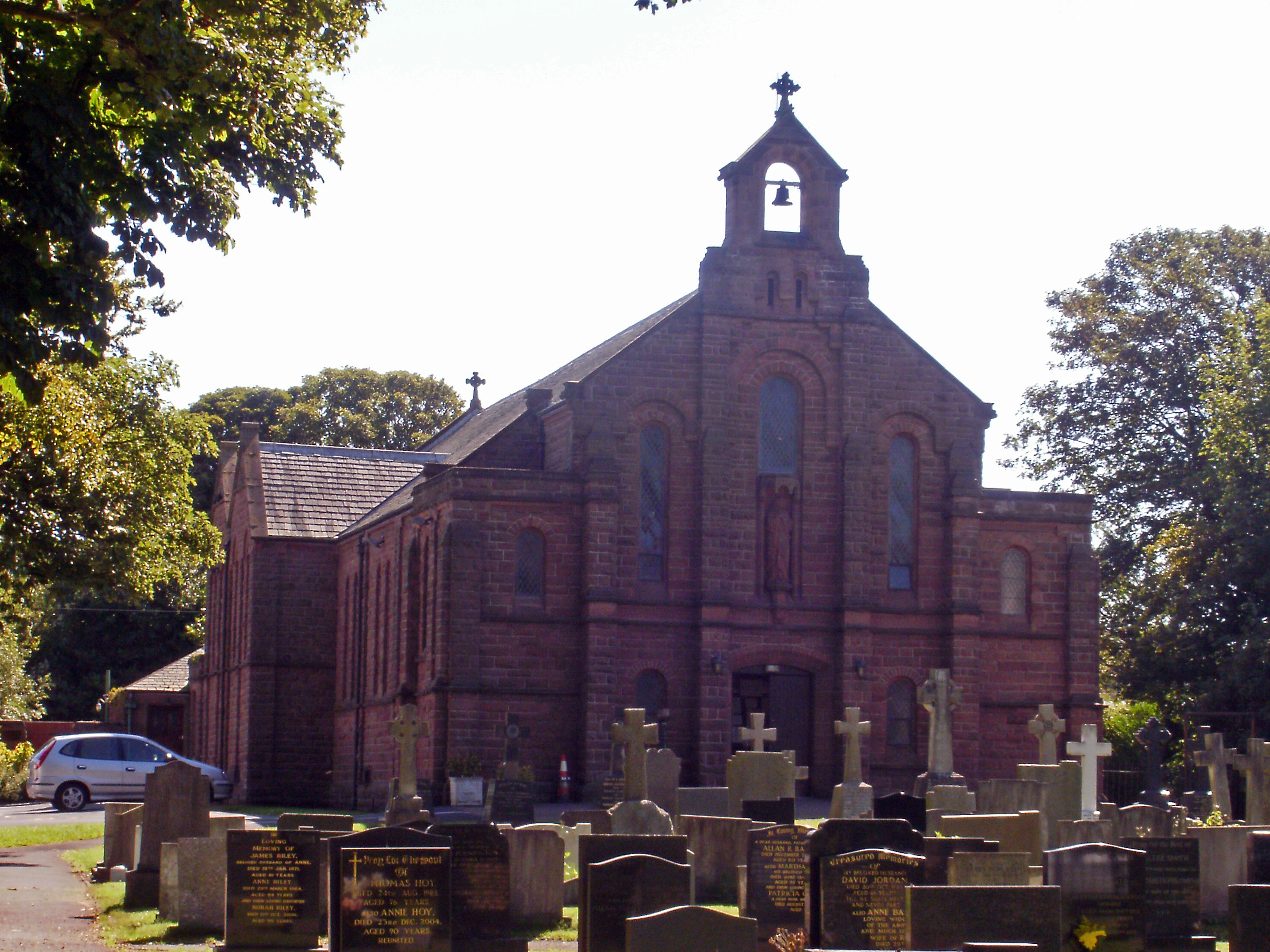
- St John's Church from Breck Road, to the west

- Location in the Borough of Wyre
- OS grid reference: SD 35308 40011
- Location: Breck Road, Poulton-le-Fylde, Lancashire
- Country: England
- Denomination: Roman Catholic

History
- Dedication: John the Evangelist

Architecture
- Functional status: Active

Administration
- Province: Liverpool
- Diocese: Lancaster

The Church of St John the Evangelist is a Roman Catholic church in the market town of Poulton-le-Fylde, Lancashire, England. The current church replaced an earlier chapel which lies a few metres to the north-east. The former chapel, with its attached presbytery, has been designated a Grade II listed building by English Heritage.

Completed in 1813, St John's was the first Roman Catholic chapel to be built in Poulton-le-Fylde, a parish which had remained sympathetic to Catholicism after the Reformation. The box-shaped rendered brick building, with slate roofs, was replaced by a larger church in 1912.

== History ==
At the time of the English Reformation, St Chad's Church became Poulton's Anglican parish church. Roman Catholics were still active in the area and Poulton was considered "one of the most Catholic parishes in the county"; in the late 16th century, there were thirteen households in the parish who would shelter Catholic seminarians. For a time (possibly until 1745), Catholic families would travel to nearby Singleton to worship. In the early 17th century, it was decided to build the first Roman Catholic chapel in Poulton, and St John's was completed in 1813, dedicated to John the Evangelist. The land, between Moorland Road and Breck Road, had been donated by Thomas Fitzherbert-Brockholes. A tradition from the 1930s tells a story of an old vestment being given to the Catholic church by the vicar of St Chad's, because he thought the vestment was "papist". Investigation by the Victoria and Albert Museum in London identified the probable vestment as dating from the early 16th century, with English embroidery. The new church was completed in 1912, built to the design of Cuthbert Pugin of Pugin & Pugin.

St John's is an active church in the Sacred Heart Deanery of the Roman Catholic Diocese of Lancaster.

== Architecture ==
=== Former chapel and presbytery ===
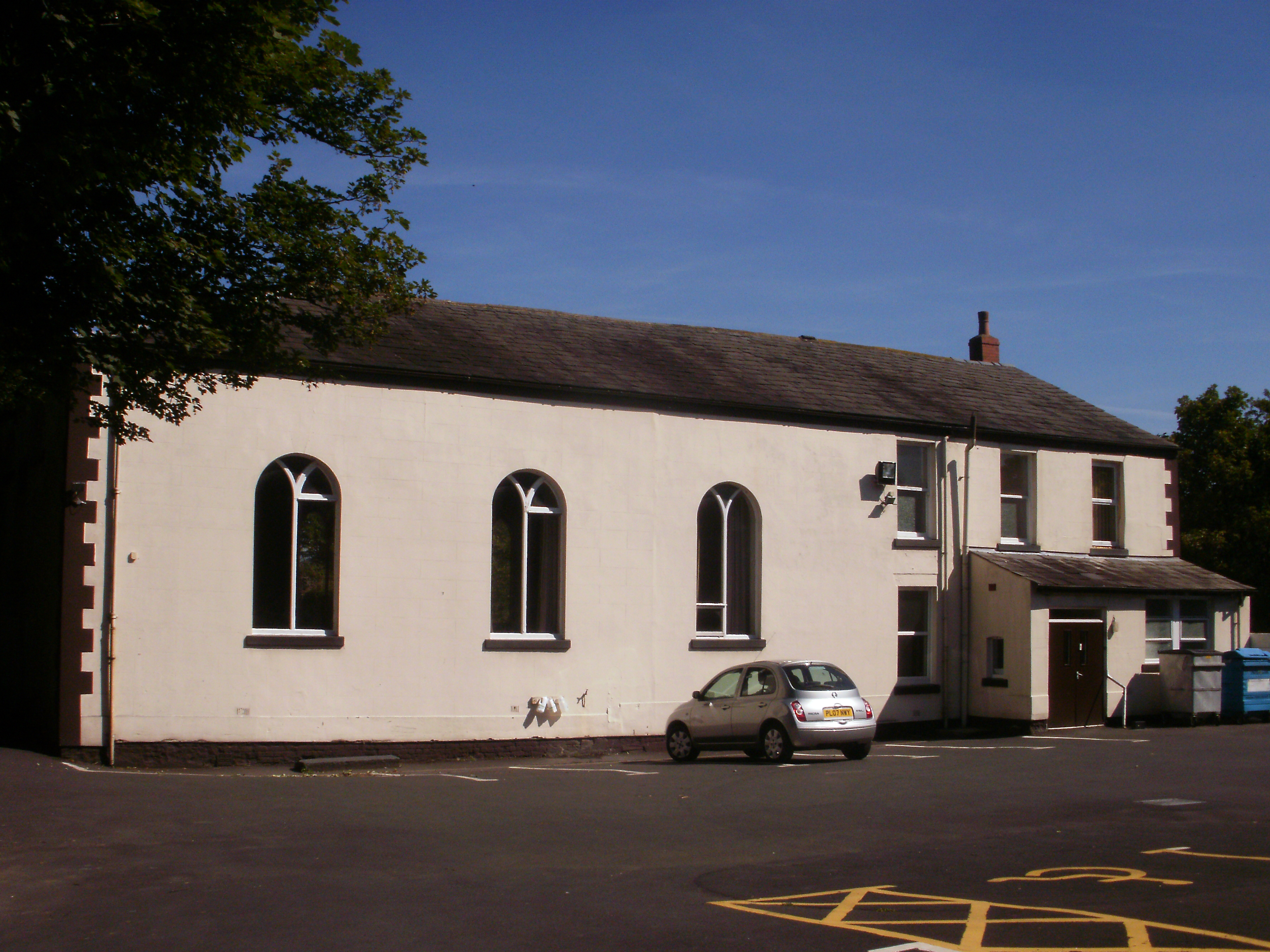
Former chapel with attached presbytery

The former chapel with attached presbytery (priest's house) are situated under a continuous hipped roof. The building is constructed of rendered brick with a slate roof. Its plan is rectangular. The chapel, which occupies two thirds of the building, has three bays and is on one storey. The presbytery is on two storeys and has three symmetrical bays.

The entrance to the church is on the north side and is concealed by a porch. An inscription above reads "I have loved, O Lord, the beauty of thy house, and the place where they Glory dwelleth. AD 1813". On either side of the door are semicircular windows. In each of the north and south walls are three tall two-light windows with arched heads and timber Y-tracery. The presbytery has conventional sash windows. The building was designated a Grade II listed building by English heritage on 16 August 1983. The Grade II listing is for buildings that are "nationally important and of special interest".

=== Current church ===
The current church is constructed of rock-faced red sandstone in a stripped Romanesque style. The front of the building, to the west, is articulated by buttresses. At the top is a bellcote. Above the entrance is a niche containing a statue, with a Latin inscription. The church is one vessel internally, with aisles and shallow transepts. There is a baptistery at the south-west. A gallery runs along the west with a projected canted front, with pine balustrades. Stairs to the gallery lie at the north-west of the church. The altars and reredoses were designed by Boulton of Cheltenham.

=== Churchyard ===
The churchyard contains a war grave of a Royal Engineers soldier of World War II.

== See also ==
- Listed buildings in Poulton-le-Fylde
