= Teanlowe Centre =

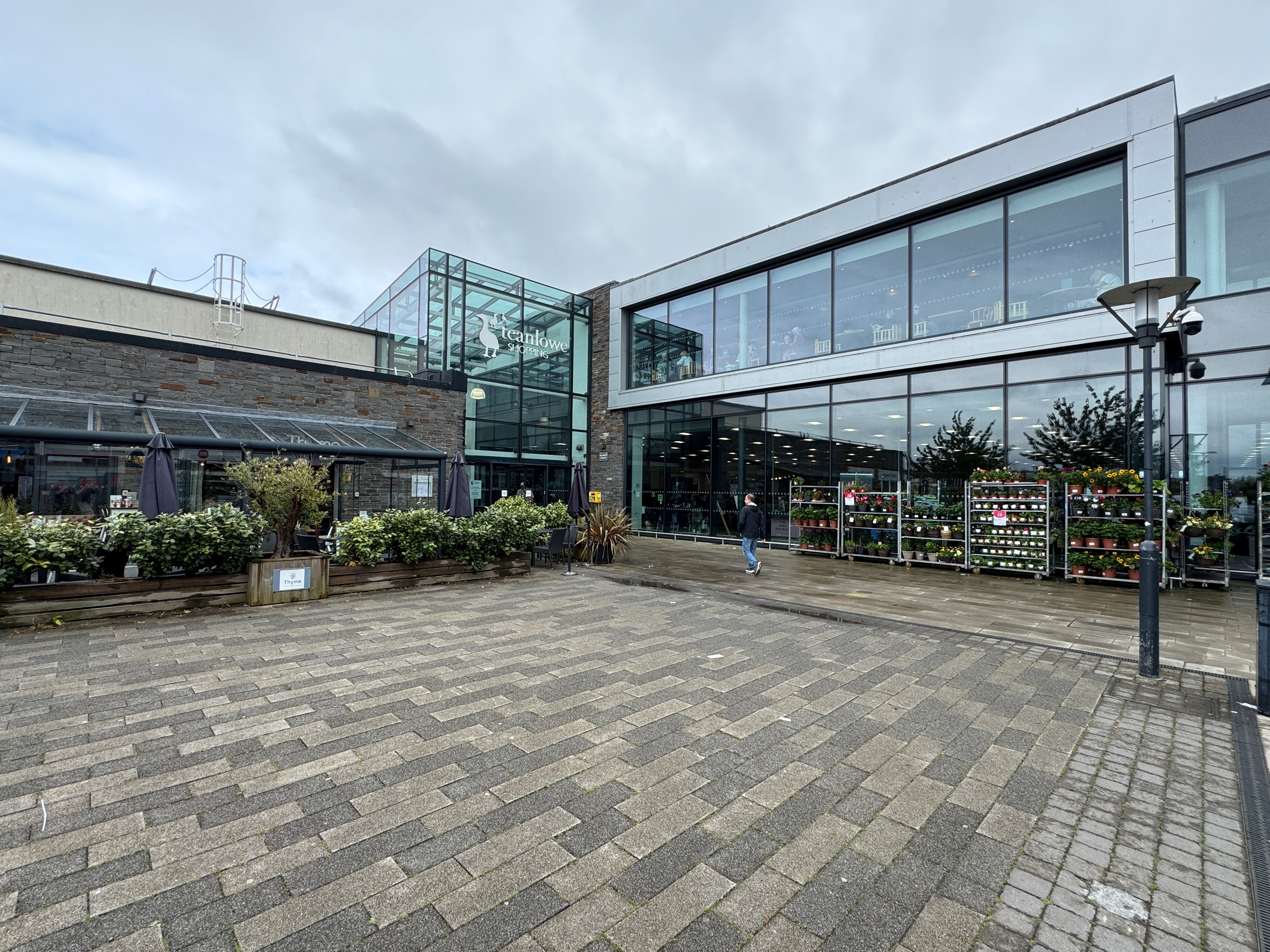
- A 2024 view of the main entrance
- Location: Poulton-le-Fylde, Lancashire, England
- Coordinates: 53°50′49″N 2°59′36″W
- Opened: 1974 (52 years ago)
- Floors: 2
- Website: www.visitpoulton-le-fylde.co.uk/about/town-centre/teanlowe-shopping-centre/

The Teanlowe Centre is a shopping centre in Poulton-le-Fylde, Lancashire, England. Completed in 1974, it is bounded by Tithebarn Street to the north, Church Street to the east, Blackpool Old Road (the B5267) to the south and Queensway (also the B5267) to the west.

Its name is derived from Halloween festival (Teanlay), which took place on the site in mediaeval times. The name was chosen by a student from Poulton's Hodgson High School.

There are three entrances to the Teanlowe Centre: one from the Tithebarn Street and Queensway car park, one from Blackpool Old Road and one from Church Street.

== History ==
Burlington Street used to form the southern side of the Old Town Hall on Church Street. It was demolished by the construction of the Teanlowe Centre. Other buildings between Market Place and Poulton Library were demolished, including the Sportsman's Arms Pub.

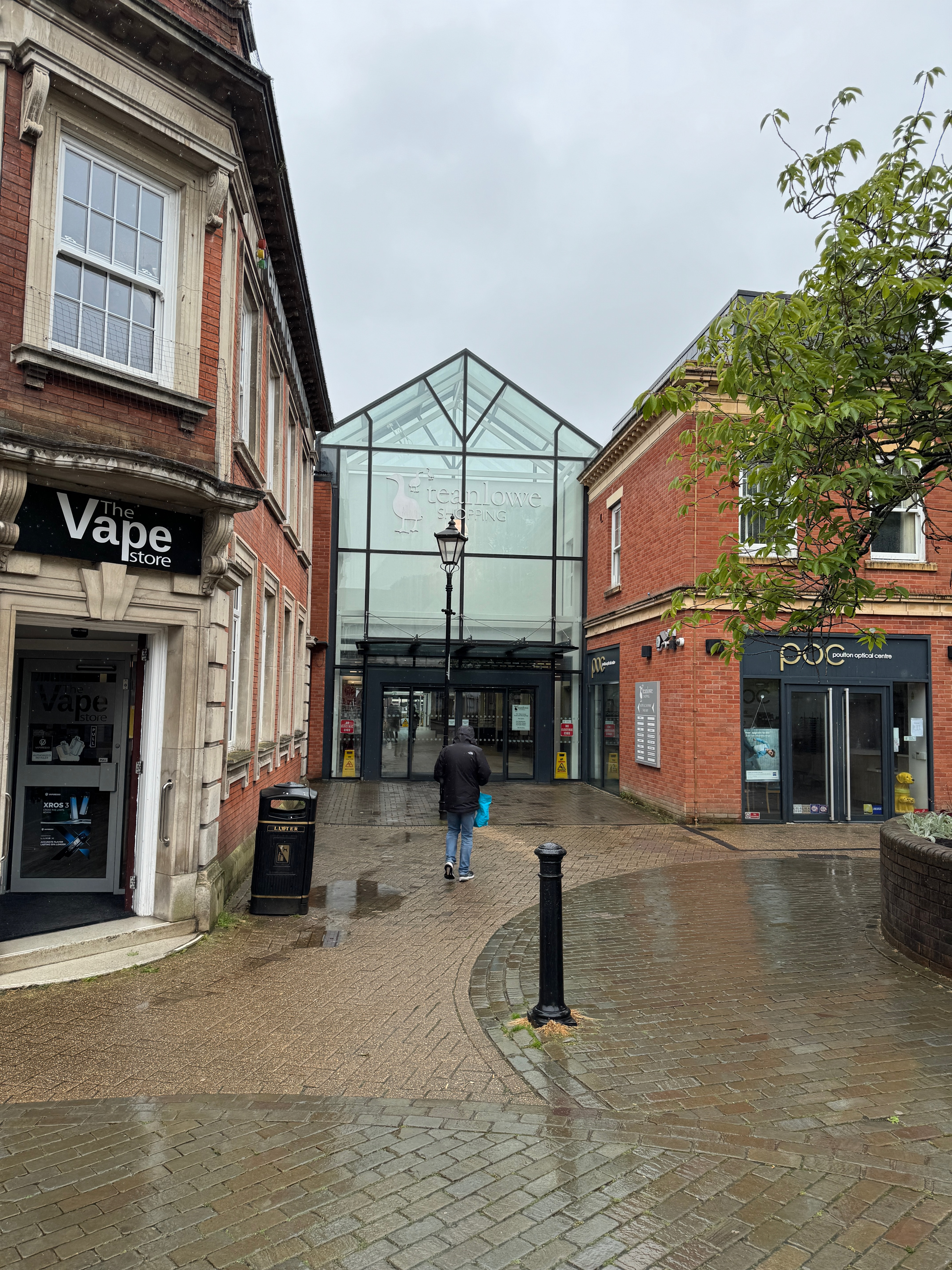
Burlington Street formerly stood where this entrance to the shopping centre is today. Viewed from Market Place in 2024

Wyre councillors agreed to sell the Teanlowe Centre in 1991, resulting in a freehold that would have made £300,000, but the plan fell through.

Nightclubs formerly occupied the second level of the Teanlowe, including The Hub and the Peppermint Lounge.

In 2016, the Teanlowe underwent a £6.7 million renovation. The Booths supermarket chain was added in 2018, replacing WHSmith and a Co-op Food.
