= The Bull, Poulton-le-Fylde =

Pub in Lancashire, England

The Bull
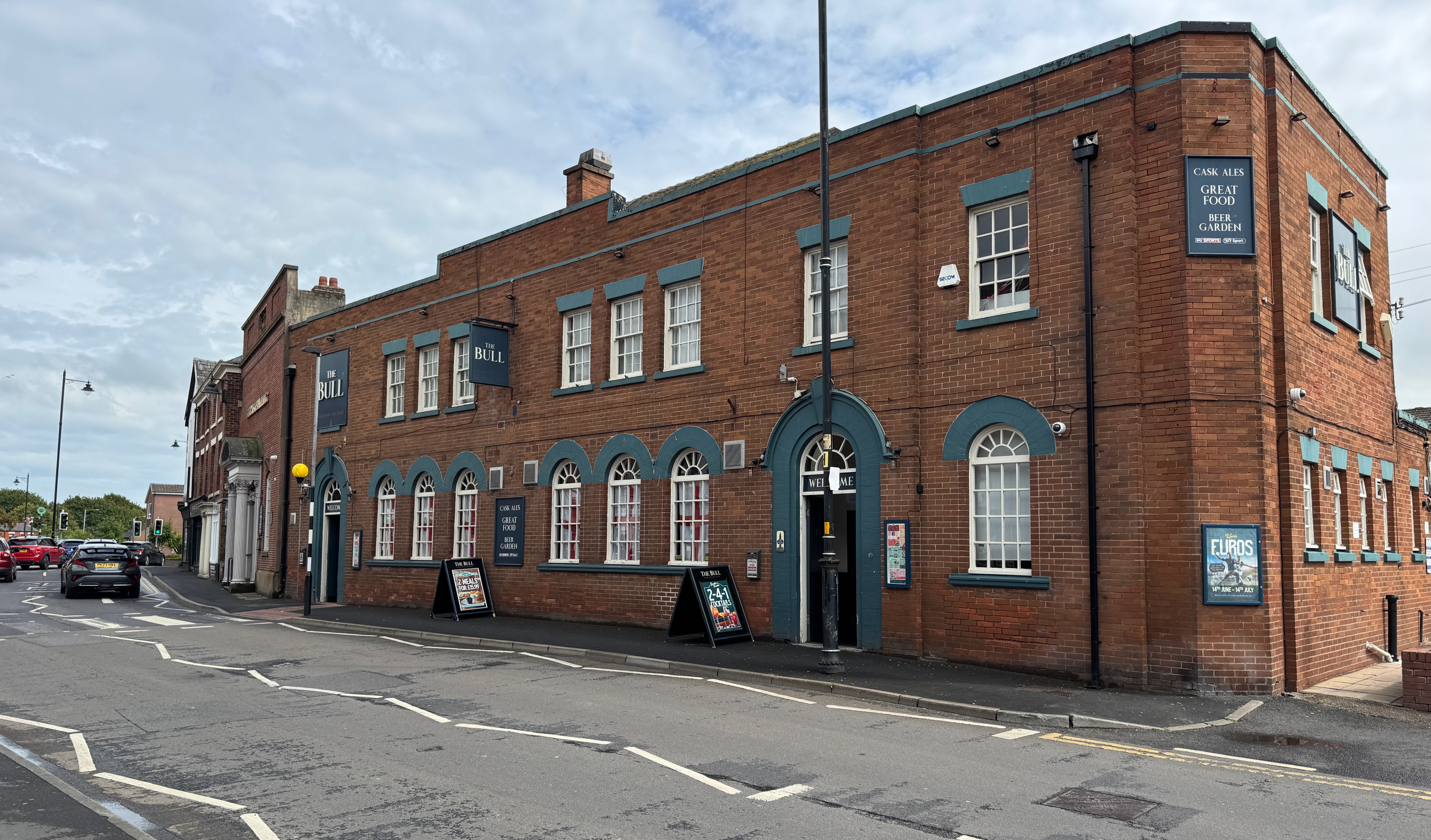
- The building in 2024
- Interactive map of the The Bull area
- Former names: The Black Bull Inn

General information
- Type: Public house
- Location: 2 Blackpool Old Road, Poulton-le-Fylde, Lancashire, England
- Coordinates: 53.84623°N 2.99268°W
- Completed: 19th century
- Owner: Stonegate Pub Company

Technical details
- Floor count: 2

Website
- www.greatukpubs.co.uk/bull-hotel-poulton-le-fylde

The Bull is a public house on Blackpool Old Road in the English market town of Poulton-le-Fylde, Lancashire. The original pub, named The Black Bull Inn, was built in the 19th century and gave its name to the street on which it stood. Bull Street was renamed Blackpool Old Road in the 20th century. The pub, named the Bull Hotel, was rebuilt in 1963.

Poulton Freemasons originally met at The Bull, prior to moving to a purpose-built location in Market Place in 1900.
