= Poulton-le-Fylde War Memorial =

War memorial in Poulton-le-Fylde, Lancashire, England

- England
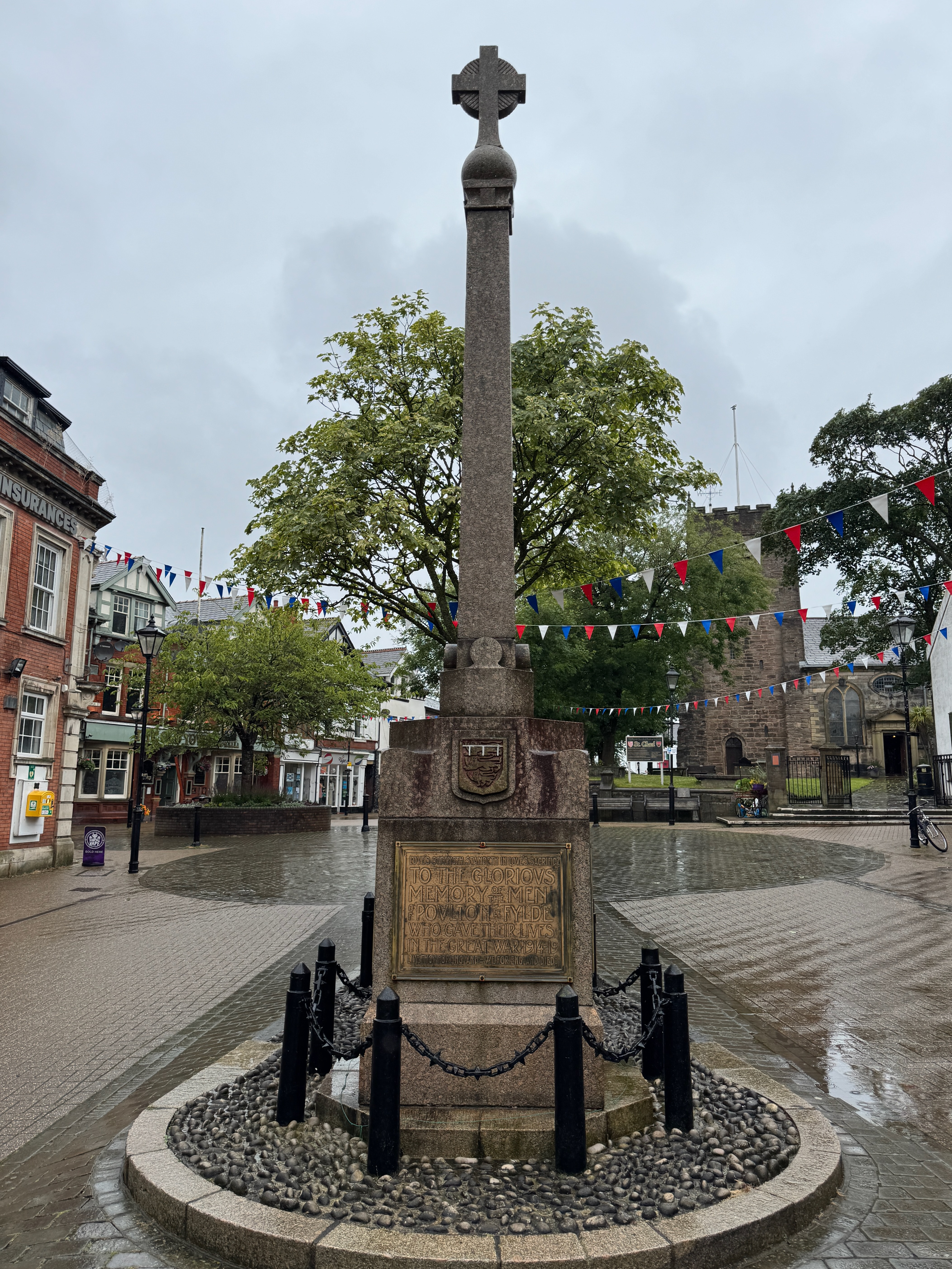
- The memorial in 2024
- For soldiers who died and served in World War I, World War II and the War in Afghanistan
- Unveiled: 1921 (105 years ago)
- Location: 53.84675°N 2.99248°W; Market Place, Poulton-le-Fylde, Lancashire, England

Erected in 1921, the Poulton-le-Fylde War Memorial is located in the English market town of Poulton-le-Fylde, Lancashire. A Grade II listed structure, it stands in a small cobbled area at the north end of Market Place, having been moved from nearby Queen's Square in 1979. Made of granite, it consists of a pillar with an octagonal foot, and a ball finial surmounted by a wheel-head cross. The pillar is on a square plinth on an octagonal step. On the plinth is a timber plaque with a coat of arms, a bronze plaque with an inscription, and further plaques recording the names of those lost in the World Wars and another conflict.

== See also ==
- Listed buildings in Poulton-le-Fylde
