= 1 Vicarage Road =

Building in Poulton-le-Fylde, Lancashire, England

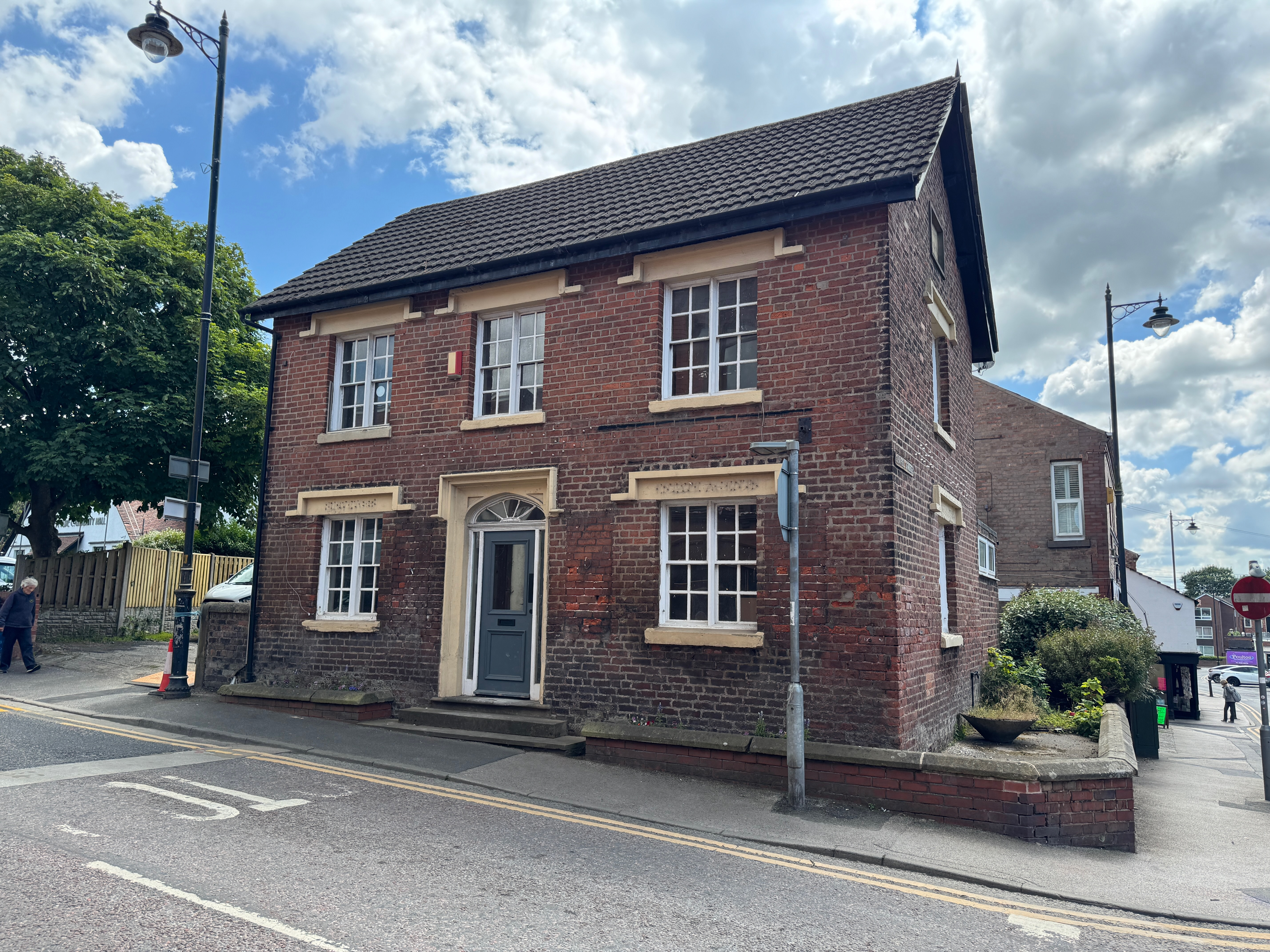
- The building in 2024

- Location in Wyre Borough Location in Lancashire
- 53.8474°N 2.991°W
- Location: Poulton-le-Fylde, Lancashire, England

History
- Built: 1839 (187 years ago)

Listed Building – Grade II
- Designated: 16 August 1983
- Reference no.: 1362191

1 Vicarage Road is a Grade II listed building in the English market town of Poulton-le-Fylde, Lancashire. Built in 1839, it stands at the corner of Vicarage Road and Chapel Street. It directly across the latter from the Thatched House public house. Now an estate agent, the building was originally Poulton Savings Bank. It was the town's library in the 1880s.

It is symmetrical, constructed of brick with stone dressings and a concrete tile roof. The front entrance is a stone doorway with a depressed-arch head and a radiating fanlight. The building is of two storeys. At the front there are two sash windows on the ground floor and three on the first, each with a stone windowsill and hood mould. There are a further two windows on each end. The western gable end has a stone plaque which is inscribed with "Poulton Savings Bank AD 1839".

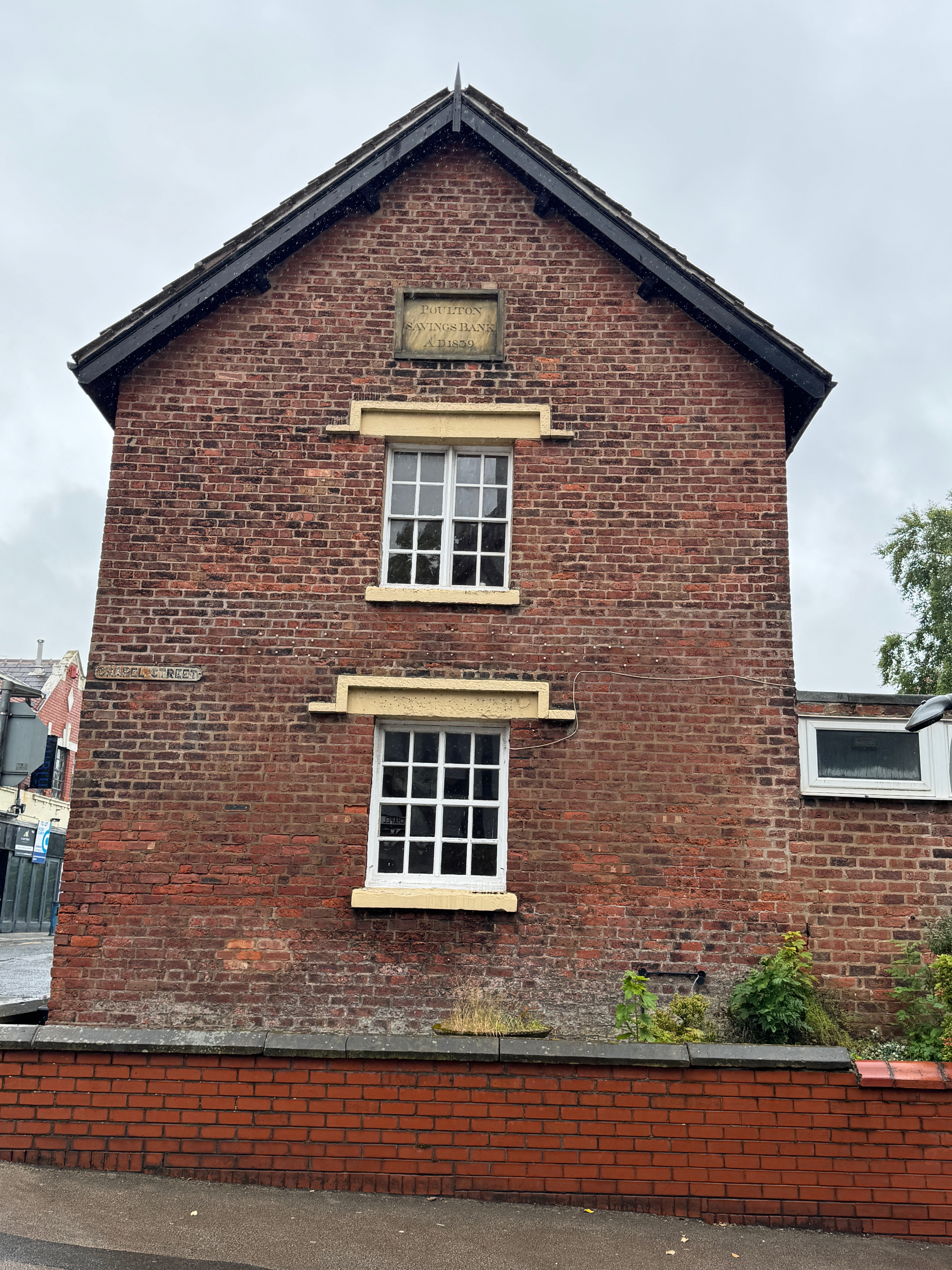
Western gable end

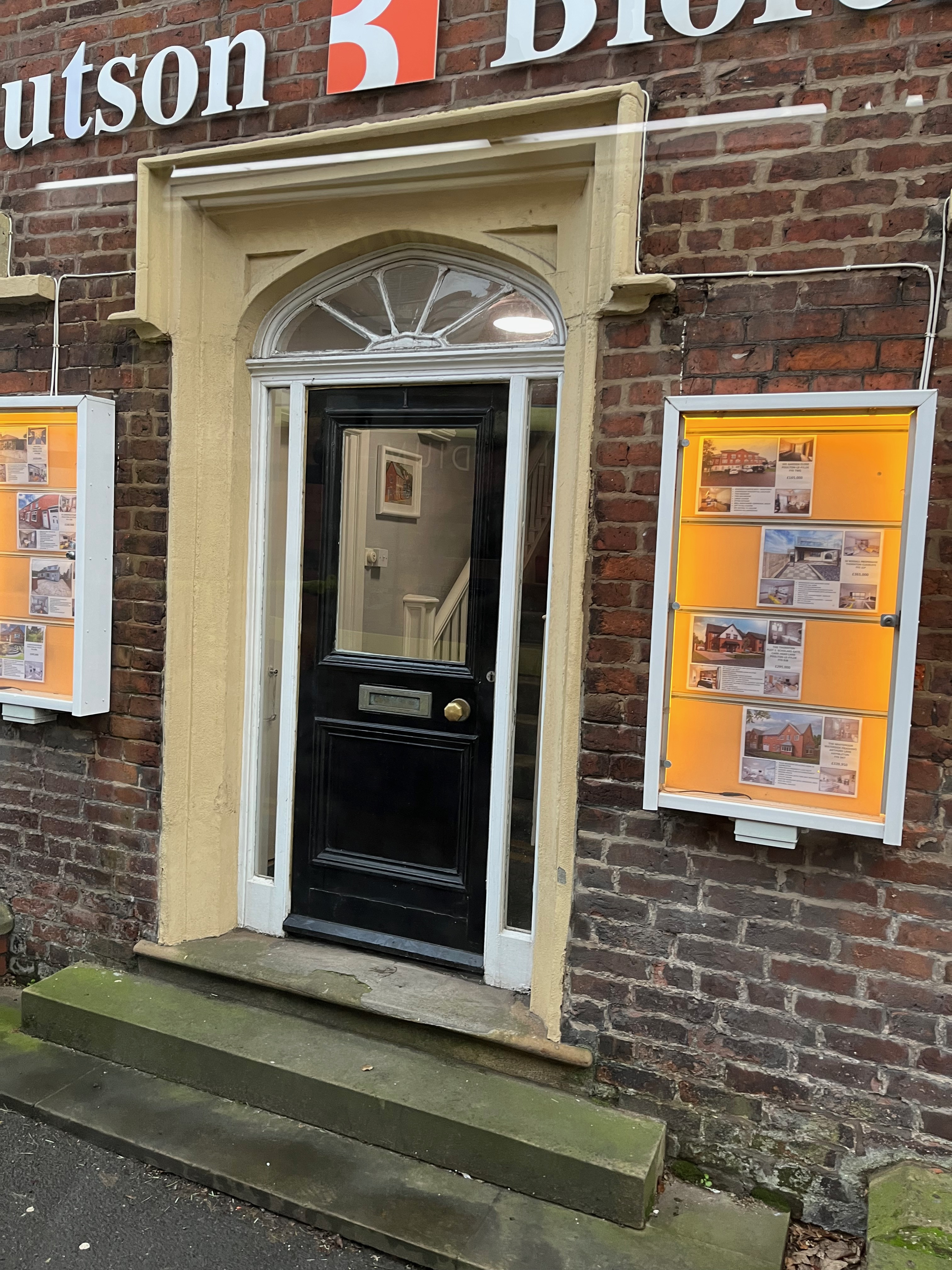
Door detail

== See also ==
- Listed buildings in Poulton-le-Fylde

== Sources ==
- Hartwell, Clare; Pevsner, Nikolaus (2009) [1969]. Lancashire: North. New Haven and London: Yale University Press. ISBN 978-0-300-12667-9.
