= Queen's Square, Poulton-le-Fylde =

Open space in Poulton-le-Fylde, England

Queen's Square
- Higher Green (original name)
- Queen's Square in the mid-20th century, looking east to the junction of Chapel Street and Higher Green. None of the buildings on the left of the picture remain
- Maintained by: Wyre Borough Council
- Location: Poulton-le-Fylde, England, UK
- Coordinates: 53.846304°N 2.991795°W
- East: Chapel Street; Higher Green
- South: Hardhorn Road
- West: Blackpool Old Road

Queen's Square (originally Higher Green) is a formerly open area in the centre of the English market town of Poulton-le-Fylde, Lancashire. It stands today, immediately to the southeast of Market Place, at the convergence of Blackpool Old Road to the west, Chapel Street (the A588) and Higher Green to the east and Hardhorn Road (also the A588) to the south.

The Grade II listed White House, an early home of chaplain Harry Viener, stands on the southern side of the square. The town's war memorial, also Grade II listed, was erected in the square in 1921. It was moved to Market Place in August 1979.

Several buildings original to the square have since been demolished, mostly on its northern and northeastern sides. The town's courthouse also formerly stood in the square.

Catterall & Swarbrick Brewery Ltd. was established at Queen's Brewery in the square in 1880 by William Catterall and John Swarbrick. Catterall was the original owner of Queen's Brewery.

Queen's Square in the 19th century, looking west from Chapel Street. The building on the right has since been replaced
