= Blackpool Old Road =

Prominent street in Poulton-le-Fylde, England

- Bull Street (formerly)
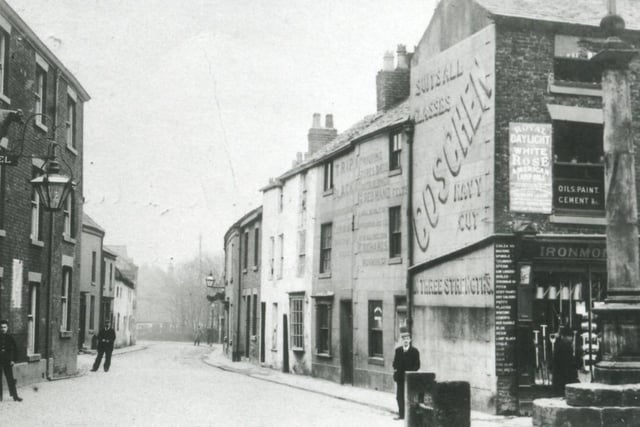
- A 1904 view, looking west, with Market Place on the right. Also on the right, only the ironmongers building remains standing in this stretch. The original Black Bull Inn (now The Bull) public house is on the left
- Interactive map of Blackpool Old Road
- Length: 1.65 mi (2.66 km)
- Location: Poulton-le-Fylde, Lancashire, England
- Southwest end: Poulton Road and Garstang Road
- Northeast end: Queen's Square and Hardhorn Road

Blackpool Old Road is a street in the market town of Poulton-le-Fylde, Lancashire, England. It runs for about 1.65 miles (2.66 km), from Poulton Road and Garstang Road in the south to Queen's Square and Hardhorn Road to the northeast. It becomes the B5268 when it passes Blackpool Road, which carries the designation to and from that point. Blackpool Old Road was formerly known as Bull Street, named for the public house (originally called the Black Bull) which stands across from Market Place. The pub was rebuilt in 1963.

As its name suggests, it was the former main route to and from Blackpool, beginning at its junction with Fleetwood Road (a continuation of the B5268), Bispham Road and Poulton Road.

Where Poulton Library stands today (at the corner of Blackpool Old Road and Queensway), there was formerly an old thatched cottage named Dudley Hall. The library was opened in 1965.

As part of the construction of the Teanlowe Centre in 1973, several buildings between Market Place and Poulton Library were demolished, including John Bamber's Sportsman's Arms Pub.

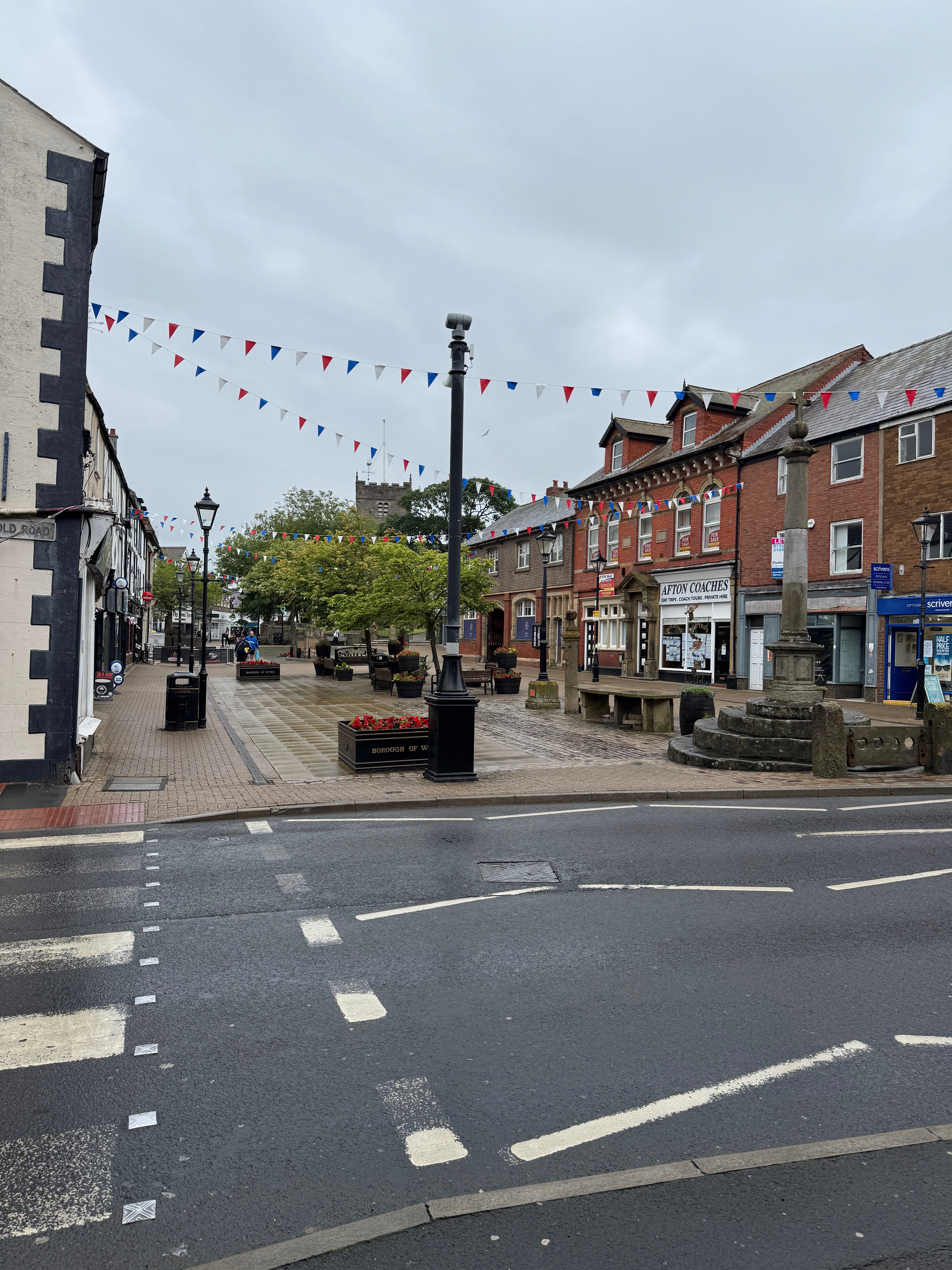
The road passing by the southern edge of Poulton-le-Fylde's Market Place a few feet from its eastern terminus

A few feet short of its terminus in Poulton, it passes immediately to the south of Market Place.
