= Market Cross, Poulton-le-Fylde =

Poulton-le-Fylde Market Cross
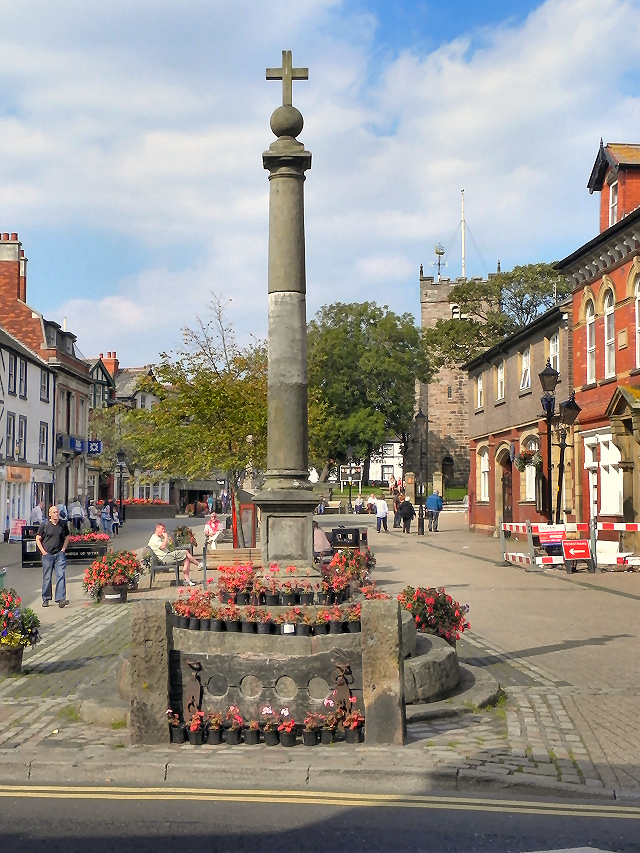
- Pictured in 2011

- Location within Lancashire
- 53.8464°N 2.9924°W
- Location: Poulton-le-Fylde, Lancashire, England

History
- Built: 17th century

Listed Building – Grade II
- Official name: Market Cross
- Designated: 23 September 1950
- Reference no.: 1072405

Poulton-le-Fylde Market Cross, in the English market town of Poulton-le-Fylde, Lancashire, was likely erected in the 17th century. Standing at the southern end of Market Place, it is a Grade II listed structure.

It is a Tuscan column constructed of stone, consisting of three tapered cylinders on a square pedestal, which in turn sits on a circular plinth of four steps. On top of the cylinders is a ball finial with a cross. The cross is similar to those at Kirkland and Garstang and is situated between the stocks and the fish stones.

== See also ==
- Listed buildings in Poulton-le-Fylde
