= St Chad's Church, Poulton-le-Fylde =

Coordinates: 53.8472°N 2.9921°W

St Chad's
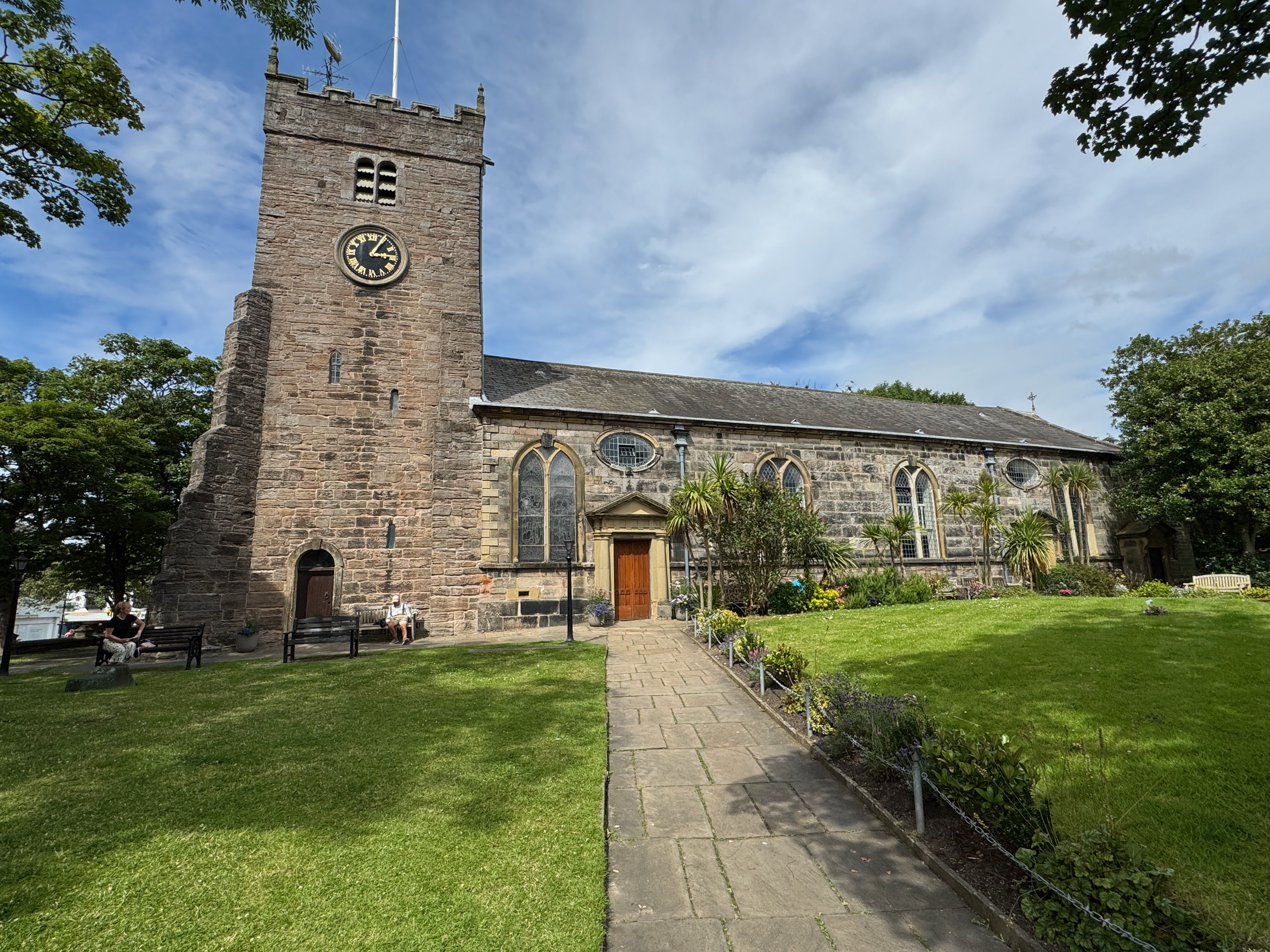
- St Chad's Church from the south

- Location in the Borough of Wyre
- OS grid reference: SD 3482 3945
- Location: Poulton-le-Fylde, Lancashire
- Country: England
- Denomination: Anglican

History
- Status: Parish church
- Dedication: Chad of Mercia

Architecture
- Functional status: Active
- Heritage designation: Grade II*
- Designated: 23 September 1950
- Architect(s): Paley and Austin (1868); J. S. Crowther (1881–83)

Specifications
- Length: 113 feet 6 inches (34.59 m) (internal)
- Materials: Red sandstone with grey ashlar

Administration
- Province: York
- Diocese: Blackburn
- Archdeaconry: Lancaster
- Deanery: Poulton

Clergy
- Vicar: Martin Keighley

St Chad's Church is an Anglican church in Poulton-le-Fylde, Lancashire, England. It is an active parish church in the Diocese of Blackburn and the archdeaconry of Lancaster. It is recorded in the National Heritage List for England as a designated Grade II* listed building. A church on the site was built no later than the 11th century and may have existed prior to the Norman Conquest of England. The tower dates from the 17th century, and much of the remainder of the building from a major renovation in the 18th century, although some of the fabric of the original structure remains. Further renovation and additions took place in the 19th, 20th and 21st centuries.

Soon after the Norman conquest, Poulton was granted to Lancaster Priory. In the 15th century, the church was given by Henry V to Syon Monastery in Middlesex. It returned to the Crown following the dissolution of the monasteries and from the 16th to the 20th century, the advowson (the right to appoint a parish priest)^{A} belonged to the Hesketh/Fleetwood family.

The red sandstone building is faced with grey ashlar and consists of a nave, chancel, square tower and a Norman-style apse. Its furnishings include a Georgian staircase, a Jacobean pulpit, box pews and hatchments. There are eight bells in the tower. Outside the church are the remains of a stone preaching cross.

== History ==
There has probably been a church on the site of the present St Chad's since before the Norman Conquest of England in 1066, and there is written evidence of one from 1094. The Domesday Book of 1086 mentioned three churches in the hundred of Amounderness, although they were not named. Later documentary evidence suggests that they were probably the churches at Poulton, Kirkham and St Michael's on Wyre. The dedication of Poulton's church to 7th century Anglo-Saxon saint Chad of Mercia lends weight to its pre-conquest foundation, although it is possible that it was built between 1086 and 1094.

The first documentary evidence of Poulton's church dates from 1094. After the conquest Amounderness, which included Poulton, was among the lands given by William the Conqueror to an Anglo-Norman knight named Roger the Poitevin. In 1094, Roger founded the Benedictine priory of St. Mary at Lancaster, as an offshoot of the Abbey of St. Martin in Sées, Normandy. He endowed the priory with the church and land at Poulton, approximately 20 miles (32 km) away. Roger was eventually banished from the country and his possessions reverted to the Crown. In 1194 the hundred of Amounderness was given by King Richard I to Theobald Walter, 1st Baron Butler who became the High Sheriff of Lancashire. Though the advowson of Poulton (the right to select a parish priest) had been granted by Roger to the monks of Lancaster, Theobald initially thought that it should be included in his entitlements.^{A} In 1196 he relinquished his right to Poulton (along with that of Bispham), although he kept the advowsons of Preston and Kirkham.

In 1275 the Lancaster monks installed a vicar at the church. In 1291, taxation assessments made on behalf of Pope Nicholas IV valued St Chad's at £68 13s 4d—the third richest church in Lancashire. In 1345, repairs to the chancel were ordered in a letter from Simon de Bekyngham of Richmond to Sir William, the dean of Amounderness.

In 1415, King Henry V dissolved the alien priories (those under control of religious houses abroad) and the church at Poulton reverted to the Crown. It was given by Henry to Syon Monastery in Middlesex. At the time of the English Reformation in the 16th century, St Chad's became the Anglican parish church. Originally, the parish included Poulton, Carleton, Thornton, Hardhorn-with-Newton and Marton. The Syon Monastery was suppressed in 1539 during Henry VIII's dissolution of the monasteries and St Chad's again returned to the Crown's possession. In the reign of Elizabeth I (after a brief restoration of Syon by Mary I), the advowson was granted to John Fleetwood of Penwortham. The Fleetwood family remained the patrons of St Chad's until the early 20th century.

Some time in the 17th century, the present tower was built, possibly during Charles I's reign. In 1751 the church was extensively renovated. It was previously thought that the old church (except the tower) was completely demolished but recent evidence indicates that the "new" building still contains the outer walls of the previous structure. These original walls, of red sandstone, were faced with grey ashlar. The nave was rebuilt in 1753 with money from Richard Hesketh of Meols and his wife Margaret (the daughter of Richard Fleetwood).

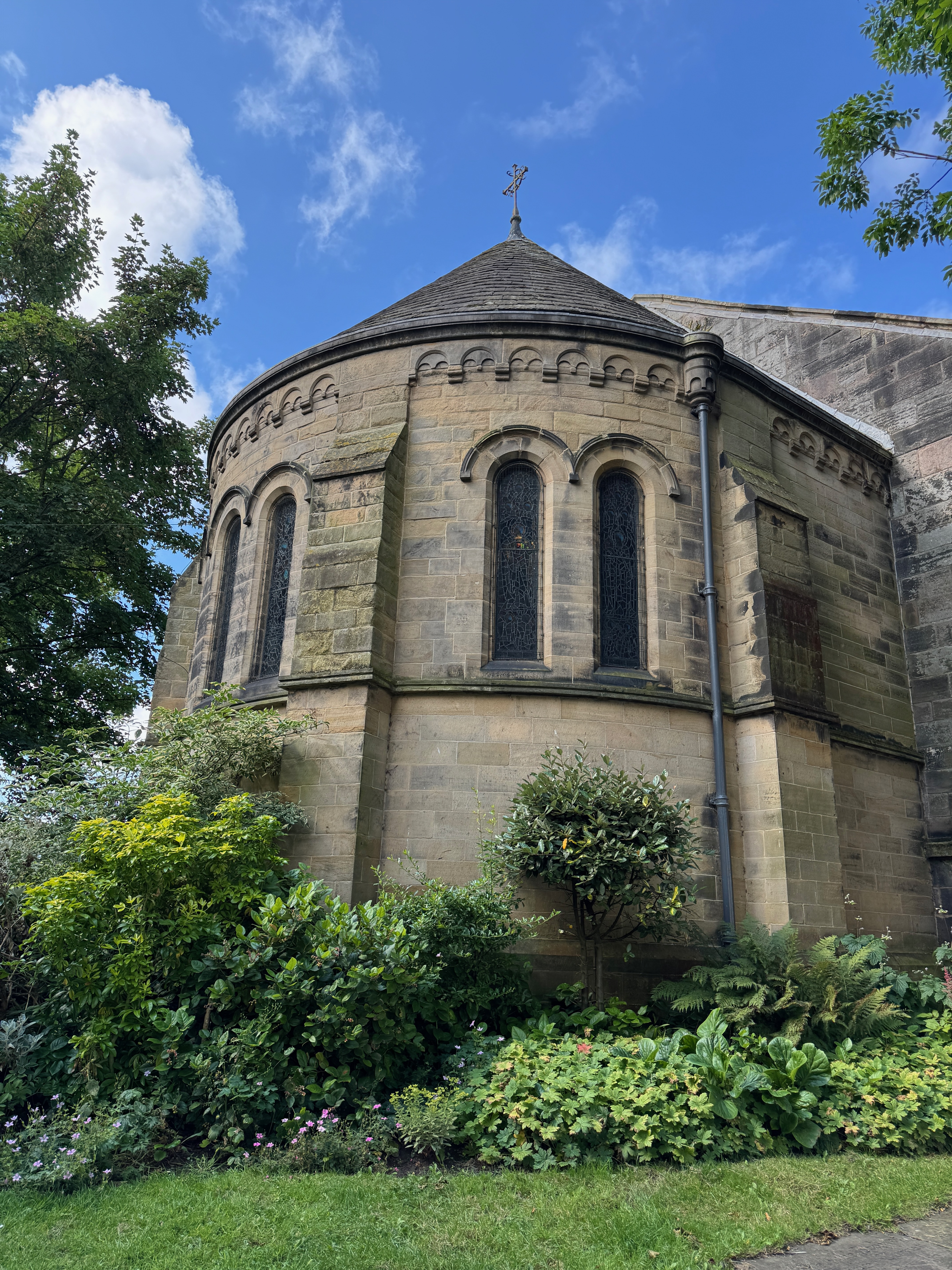
The apse of St Chad's, added in 1868

By the 19th century, the graveyard was full and had become a public health concern. It was overrun with rats, and dogs chasing the rats, both of which were damaging the churchyard. Finding sufficient ground for new burials was increasingly difficult and bones were often removed to a nearby charnel house. In 1849, an extra charge was put on burials of people from outside the parish. In 1884, the churchyard was closed to all burials and a cemetery was opened in the town.^{B}

A round Norman-style apse was added to the church in 1868, the architects being the Lancaster partnership of Paley and Austin. The incumbent, the Rev. Thomas Clarke, paid for this addition, but died before its construction was complete. Architect J. S. Crowther oversaw further alterations in 1881–83; a baptistery was built, the organ was moved and choir stalls were built in the chancel. Some work was done to the interior of the tower in 1908. Renovations in 1955 included the addition of a central aisle and the removal of some of the church furnishings. The Victorian pulpit was replaced. A small extension was added north of the tower in 2005.

The advowson to Poulton, which had been in the possession of the Fleetwood/Hesketh family for approximately 400 years, was sold in 1934 by Major Charles Fleetwood-Hesketh to the Diocese of Blackburn.

== Architecture ==
=== Exterior ===
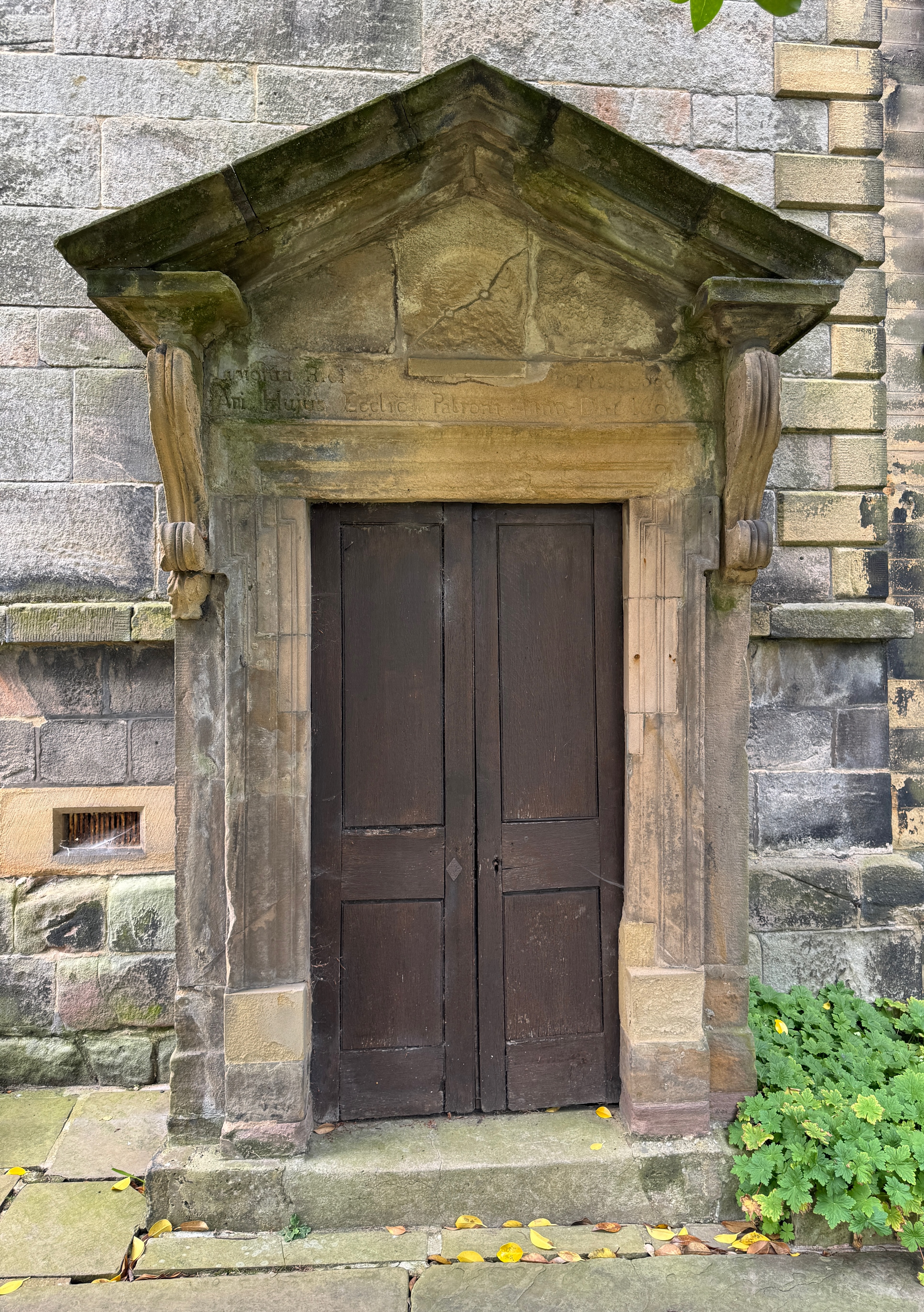
The entrance to the Fleetwood family vault

The outer walls of the church are constructed of red sandstone with grey ashlar dressings; the roofs are slate. The church plan consists of a nave, with a square tower to the west and a chancel and apsidal sanctuary to the east. There is a clergy vestry at the south-east corner of the building.

The tower at the west end of the church dates from the early 17th century. It sits next to the south-west corner of the nave, aligned with the south wall, because the former church plan included a north aisle; the north wall of the tower meets the nave at its roof ridge. It is castellated and constructed of coursed roughly-dressed stone. It has two diagonal buttresses, two angled buttresses and four corner pinnacles. There are slate belfry louvres on each side of the tower and clock faces on the north and south sides.

A small stone porch towards the east end of the south wall leads to the Fleetwood family burial vault. The doorway is inscribed with "Insignia Rici Fleetwood an hujus eccliae patronis, Anno Dni 1699".^{C} There are two more doorways on the south side of the nave, both have been restored and have Tuscan columns, triglyphs and pediments. Above the doorways are oval windows, added in the 19th century which, according to Clare Hartwell, "add a touch of sophistication". There are large round-headed pairs of arched windows with Y-tracery, (possibly added later) and plain architraves. There are three such windows on the north side and four on the south side with more round-headed windows in the apse.

=== Interior and fittings ===
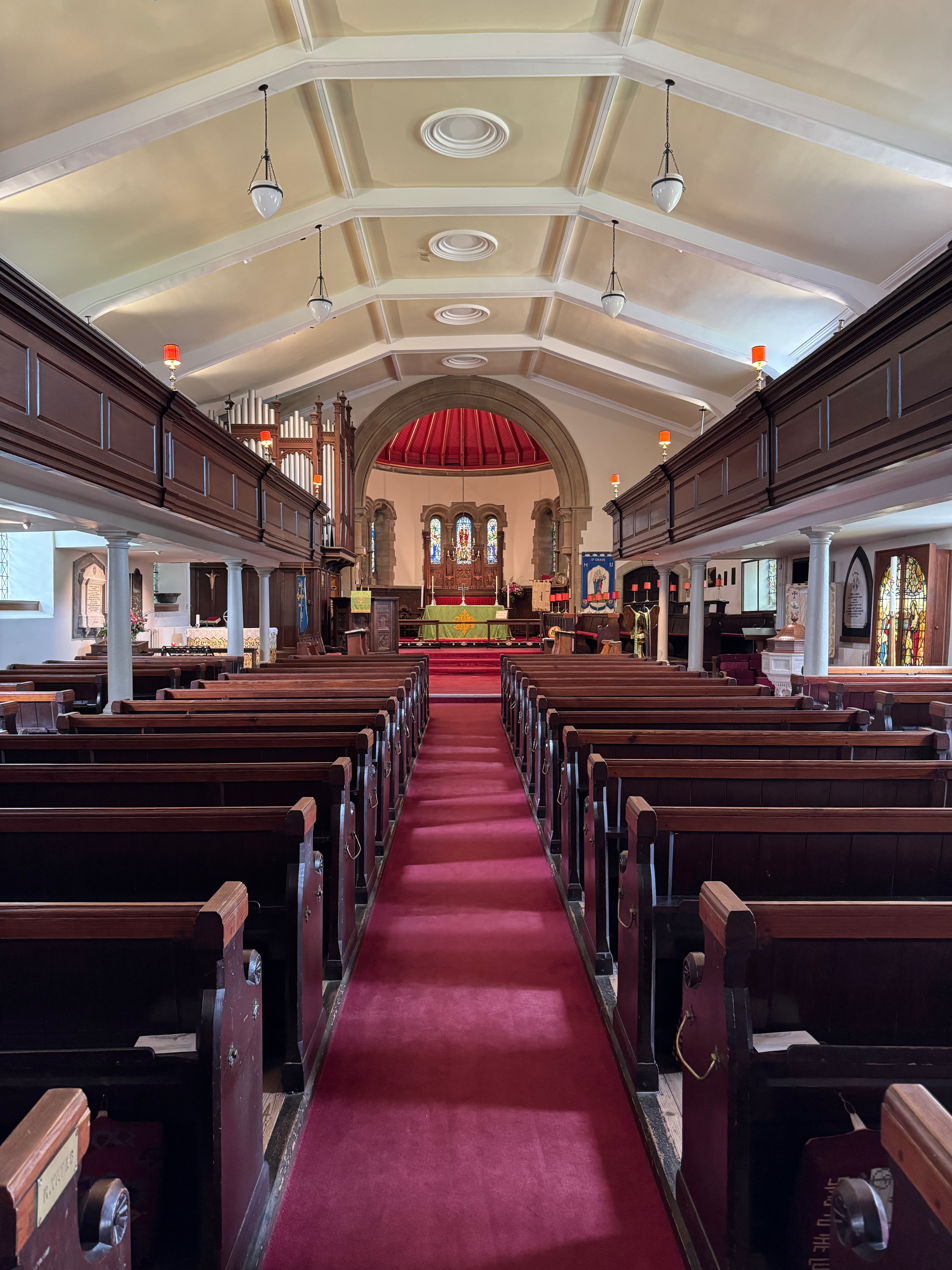
Nave

Internally, the nave measures 93 feet 6 inches (28.50 m) by 36 feet (11 m), the chancel (including apse) measures 20 feet (6.1 m) by 17 feet 6 inches (5.33 m) and the tower measures 12 feet (3.7 m) by 12 feet (3.7 m). The ceiling of the church has shallow ribbed vaulting. There are galleries to the north, west and south, accessed by a Georgian staircase in the north-west that has turned balusters. The north and south galleries are supported by plain Tuscan columns and both contain box pews that date from 1752. Stained glass dates from the late 19th century to the mid-20th century and includes work by Lancaster designers Shrigley and Hunt. The pulpit was constructed in 1955 in the Jacobean style from the four sides of a 17th-century pulpit. It has arabesques and a portion of an inscription from the Book of Isaiah.

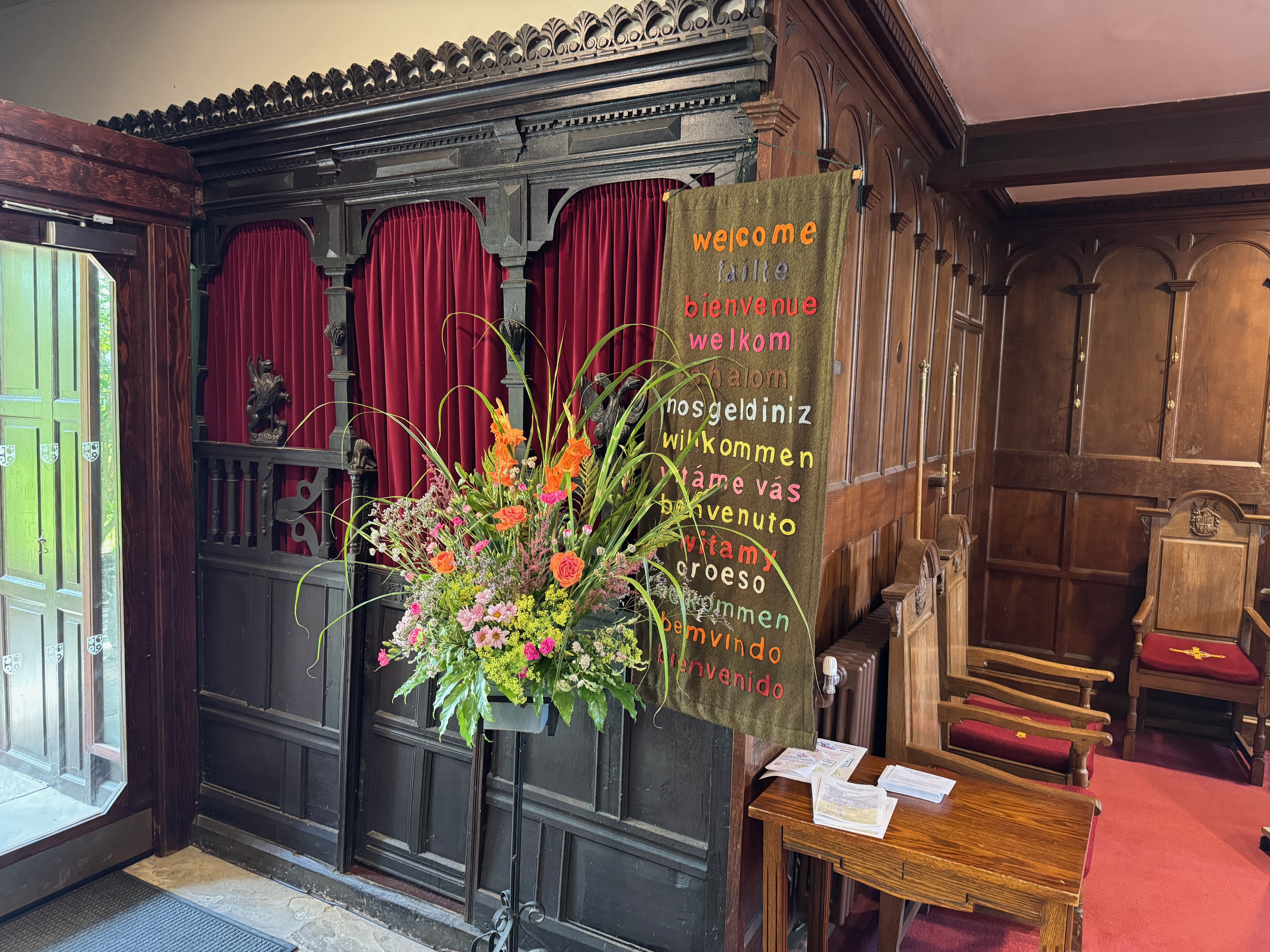
The choir vestry, constructed from carved pieces of family box pews

In the south-west corner of the nave is a choir vestry, which was originally built as a baptistery. Its screen is made of carved oak, formed in 1883 from one part of the Fleetwood family box pew that was originally situated in the chancel where the choir stalls now sit. In 1883, this pew had been described as "looking like a cross between a railway carriage and the centre piece of a gondola". The wood is carved with emblems of the family including a double-headed eagle, wheat sheaves and a griffin. The screen door comes from the box pew of another prominent local family—the Rigbys of Layton. It has a carving of a goat's head and is inscribed with "AR 1636".

Six hatchments hang in St Chad's in memory of 18th-century members of the Hesketh-Fleetwood family. These hatchments are diamond-shaped representations of individual coats of arms, painted for their funeral processions and then hung in the parish church.

There is a ring of eight bells hung in an iron frame in the tower; they are rung from the ground floor of the tower. Five of the bells were cast in 1741 by Abel Rudhall of Gloucester. They were rehung in 1908. The sixth bell was recast in 1865 by Mears and Co. of London. In 1919, the church bells were still customarily rung to signal the town curfew between September and March. Two more bells were added in 1937, cast by Mears and Stainbank.

== Churchyard ==
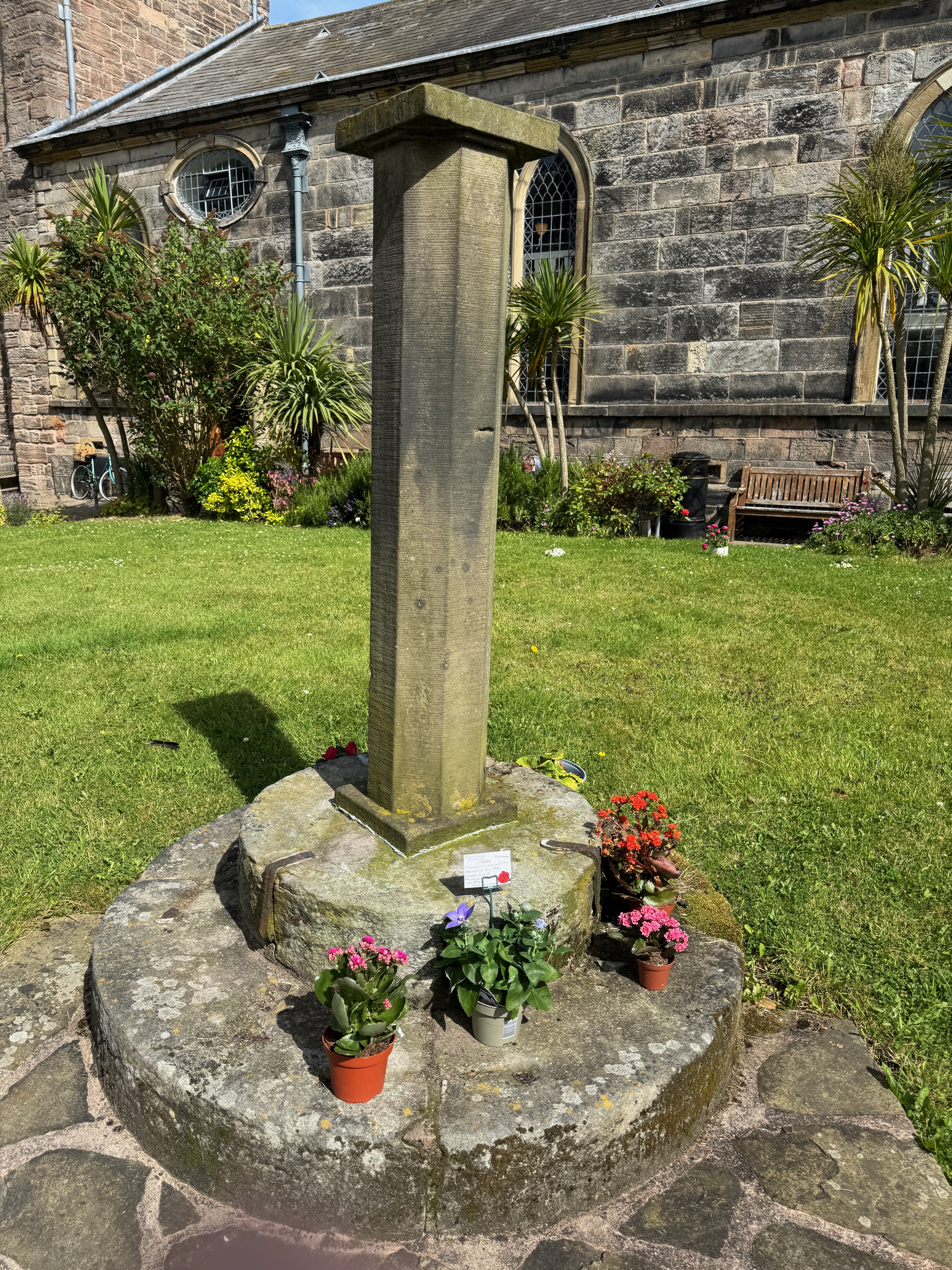
The remains of a stone preaching cross

To the south of the church there are the remnants of a stone preaching cross. The cross was originally situated on Poulton's boundary and marked a resting place for mourners travelling long distances to bury corpses at St Chad's. Only the two circular steps into which the original structure was set remain; the cross shaft has been replaced by an octagonal pillar. The pillar was used as a sundial until the early 20th century when the gnomon was stolen. The steps function as a memorial for present-day mourners at St Chad's, in a small garden of remembrance. The churchyard is noted locally for its display of crocuses and other flowering bulbs in early springtime.

Although the churchyard has been closed to burials since 1884, the ashes of cremated bodies have been interred in a small area to the west of the church since the 1950s. The paths in the churchyard incorporate gravestones that were set horizontally in 1973. There are few gravestones still standing, but there are several table tombs. To the south-east of the church there is a gravestone marking the grave of Edward Sherdley (d. 1741); the stone features carvings of a skull and crossbones and an hourglass, and is known locally as the "pirate's grave".

The northern side of the churchyard is bounded by Ball Street, while Church Street is on its western side. Until the early 20th century, buildings used to line both sides of these streets. When the building's on Ball Street's southern side and Church Street's eastern side were demolished, an obstructed view of the cemetery's raised position was left.

== Present day and assessment ==
St Chad's was designated a Grade II* listed building on 23 September 1950. An active church in the Church of England, St Chad's is part of the diocese of Blackburn, which is in the Province of York. It is in the archdeaconry of Lancaster and the Deanery of Poulton; the benefice includes Poulton, Carleton and Singleton. The Rev. Martin Keighley was appointed vicar of St Chad's in 2000. The ecclesiastical parish of Poulton-le-Fylde St Chad includes the Church of St Hilda of Whitby in Carleton.

== See also ==
- Grade II* listed buildings in Lancashire
- Listed buildings in Poulton-le-Fylde
- Market Place
- List of works by J. S. Crowther
- List of ecclesiastical works by Paley and Austin
