= Market Place, Poulton-le-Fylde =

Square in Poulton-le-Fylde, England

Market Place
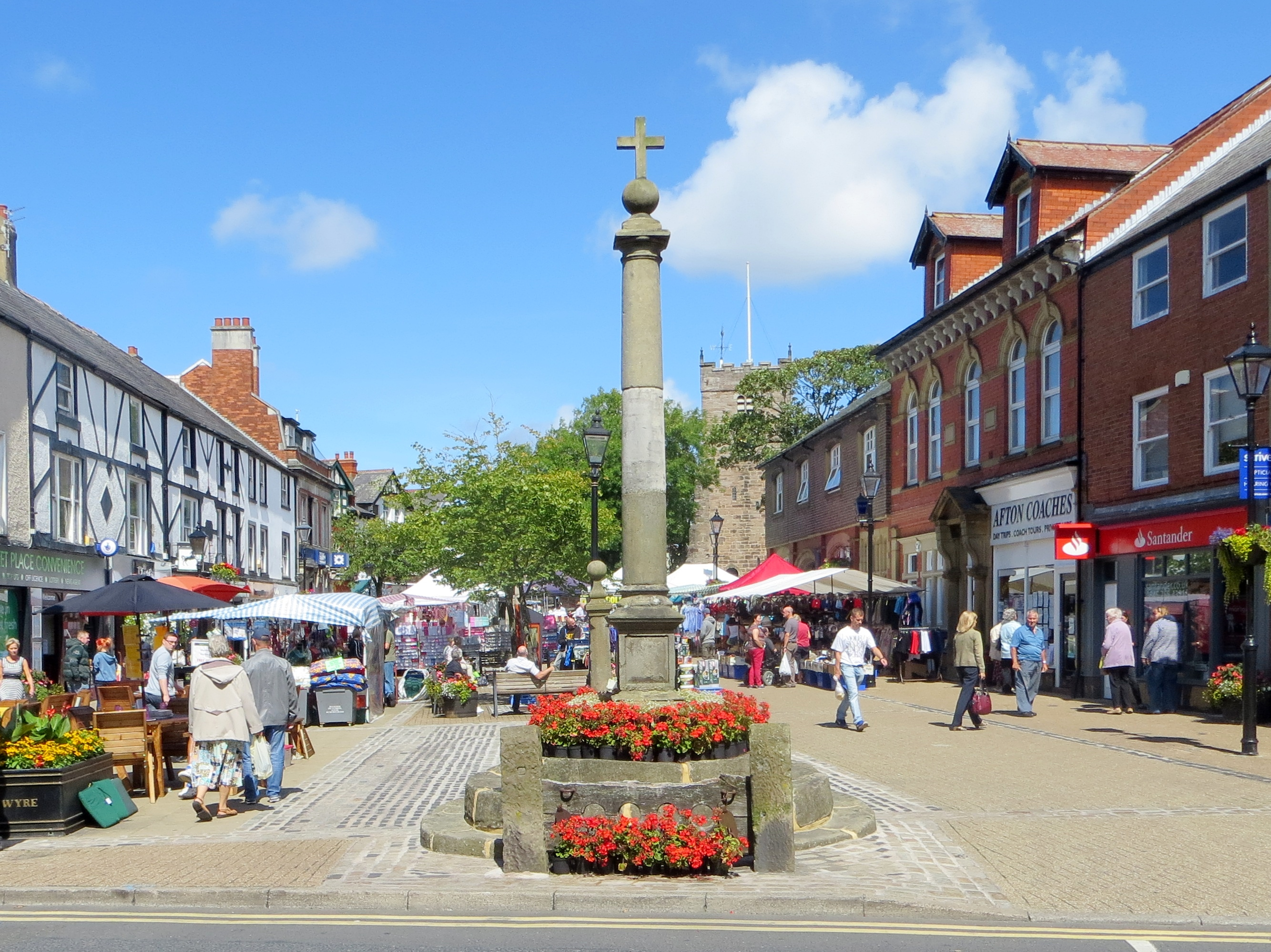
- The square on a market day in 2014, looking north from Blackpool Old Road
- Interactive map of Market Place
- Maintained by: Wyre Borough Council
- Location: Poulton-le-Fylde, England, UK
- Coordinates: 53.84671°N 2.9925°W
- North: Church Street
- South: Blackpool Old Road

Market Place is a pedestrianised public square in the market town of Poulton-le-Fylde, Lancashire, England. Dating to the Middle Ages, it has historically been a site of weekly markets, today taking place on Mondays (except Bank Holiday Monday). It is now mostly used as a shopping precinct, along with the adjacent indoor Teanlowe Centre. It is bounded by Church Street to the north and Blackpool Old Road to the south.

By the early 18th century, Market Place was surrounded by low thatched cottages and large three-storey town houses built by the local gentry. The streets were unpaved, with stepping stones in place to keep the locals' feet out of the mud.

A Grade II* listed church, St Chad's, stands beyond the square's northeastern corner, while in the square's centre is the town's war memorial. At its southern end are (in line, from north to south) the Jubilee Lamp (erected in 1887), the whipping post, fish stones, market cross and stocks (each Grade II listed).

Other notable buildings and structures in Market Place include (clockwise from the north) 2 Market Place (the former custom house), a K6 telephone box, 25–31 Market Place (featuring the arms of Alexander Rigby, who built the precursor to today's terrace in 1693) and Old Town Hall. All except Old Town Hall are Grade II listed.

The first municipal building in the town was a building known as the Moot Hall, which stood at the southern end of the square, just in front of the market cross, in late medieval times.

On 5 March 1732, a fire broke out in the square, resulting in the destruction of all of the properties on its western side. Most buildings at this time had thatched roofs, as described by Henry Fishwick in his 1885 book Remains, Historical and Literary, Connected with the Palatine Counties of Lancaster and Chester, Volume 8.

The first purpose-built police station in the town was erected on the eastern side of Market Place in 1895, using the shell of the former home of the Walmsley family. The building was demolished in 1898, and replaced two years later by a Masonic Hall. Poulton Freemasons originally met at the Bull Hotel in Market Place.

Edward, Prince of Wales, visited Market Square in 1927.

A second incarnation of the police station was built at 12–16 Market Place, with a second floor added in 1960.

The square was open to vehicular traffic until at least the early 1970s.

The Stocks, a German-themed restaurant, was in business at 33 Market Place between 1974 and 2005. James Baines's drapery business was located in the previous incarnation of the building in the 17th century.

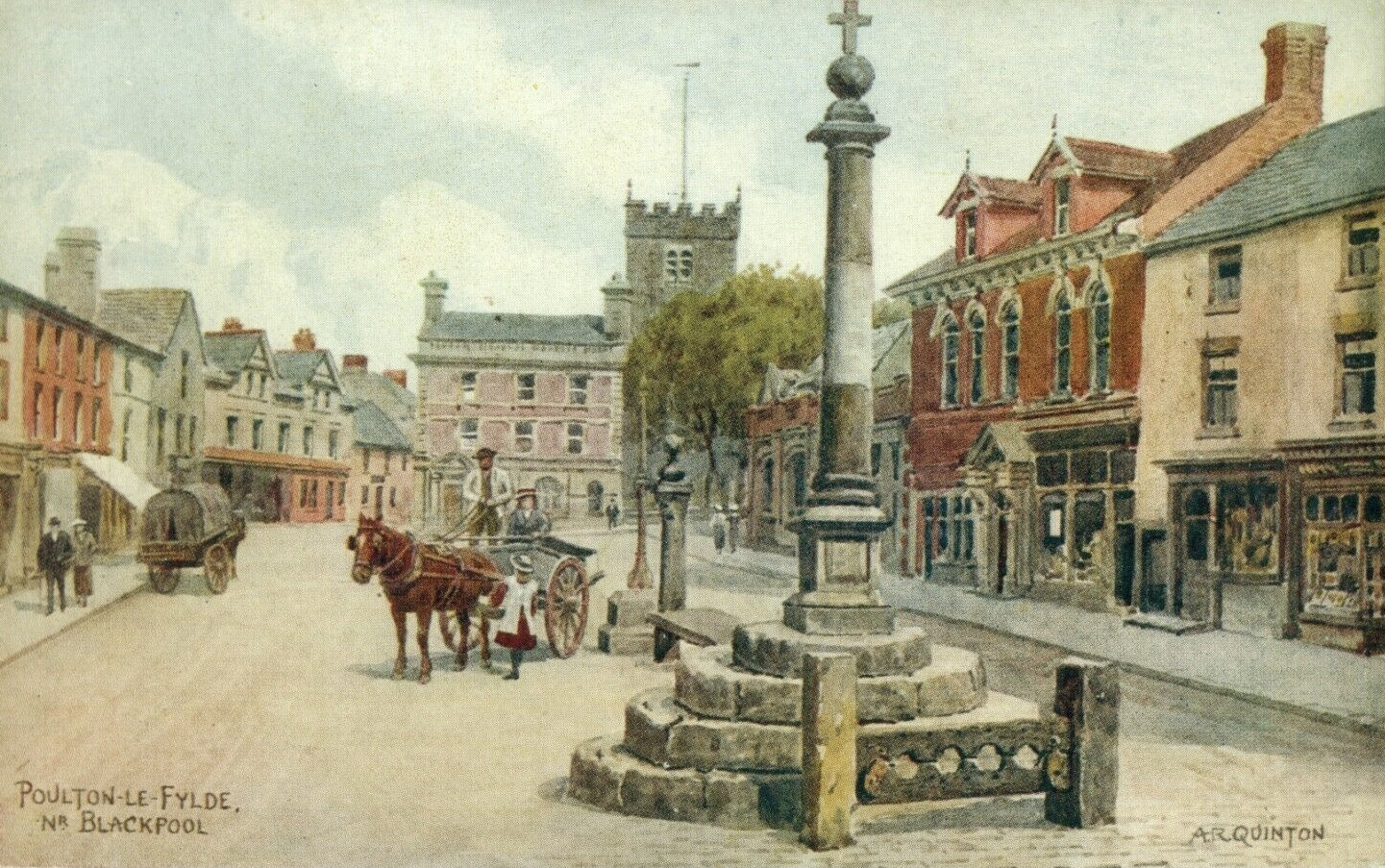
A c. 1920 postcard of Market Place, by A. R. Quinton. The building in the centre, latterly the Cyclists' Rest, was demolished in 1935

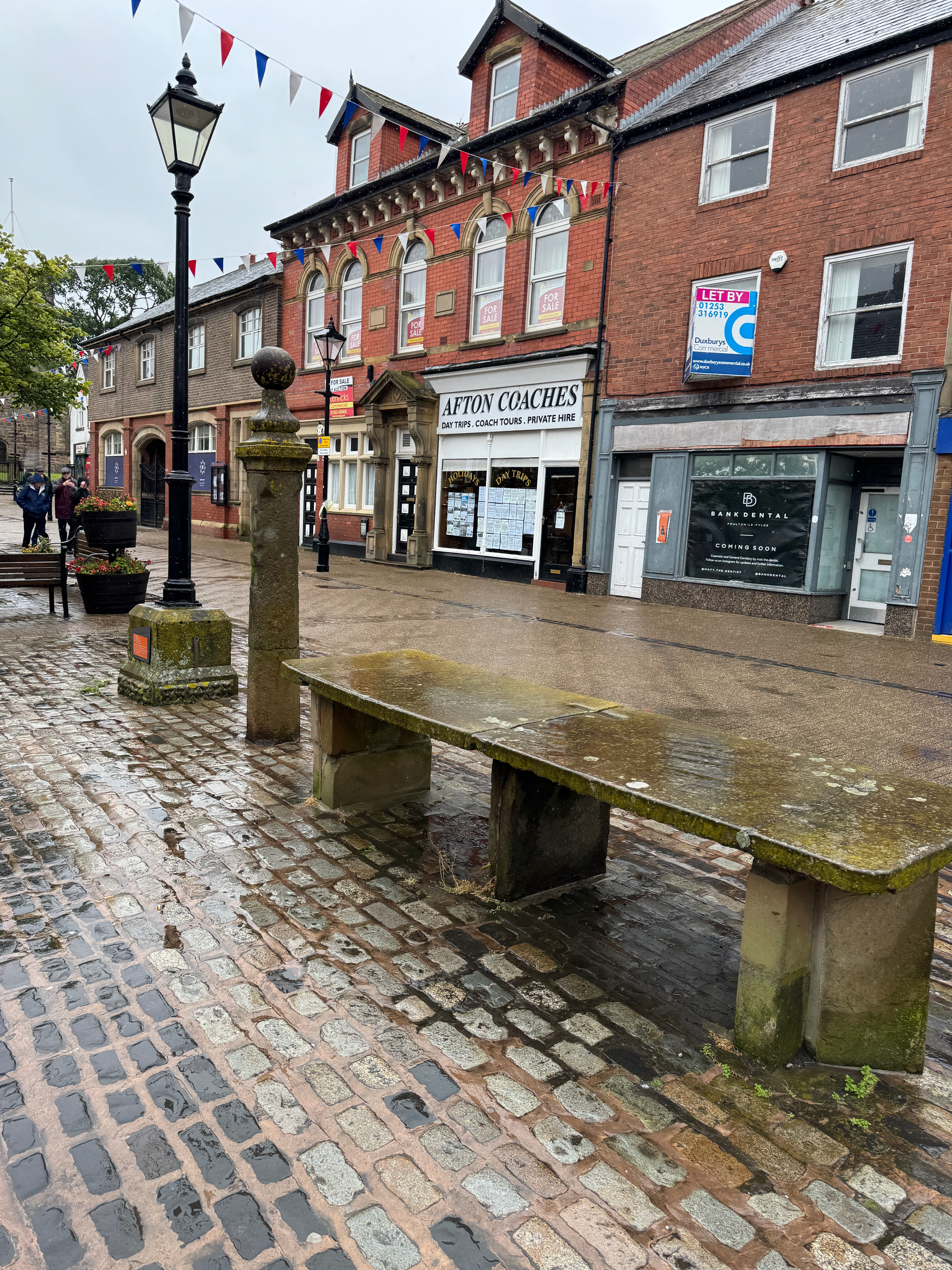
The fish stones, whipping post and (in the background) the Masonic Hall

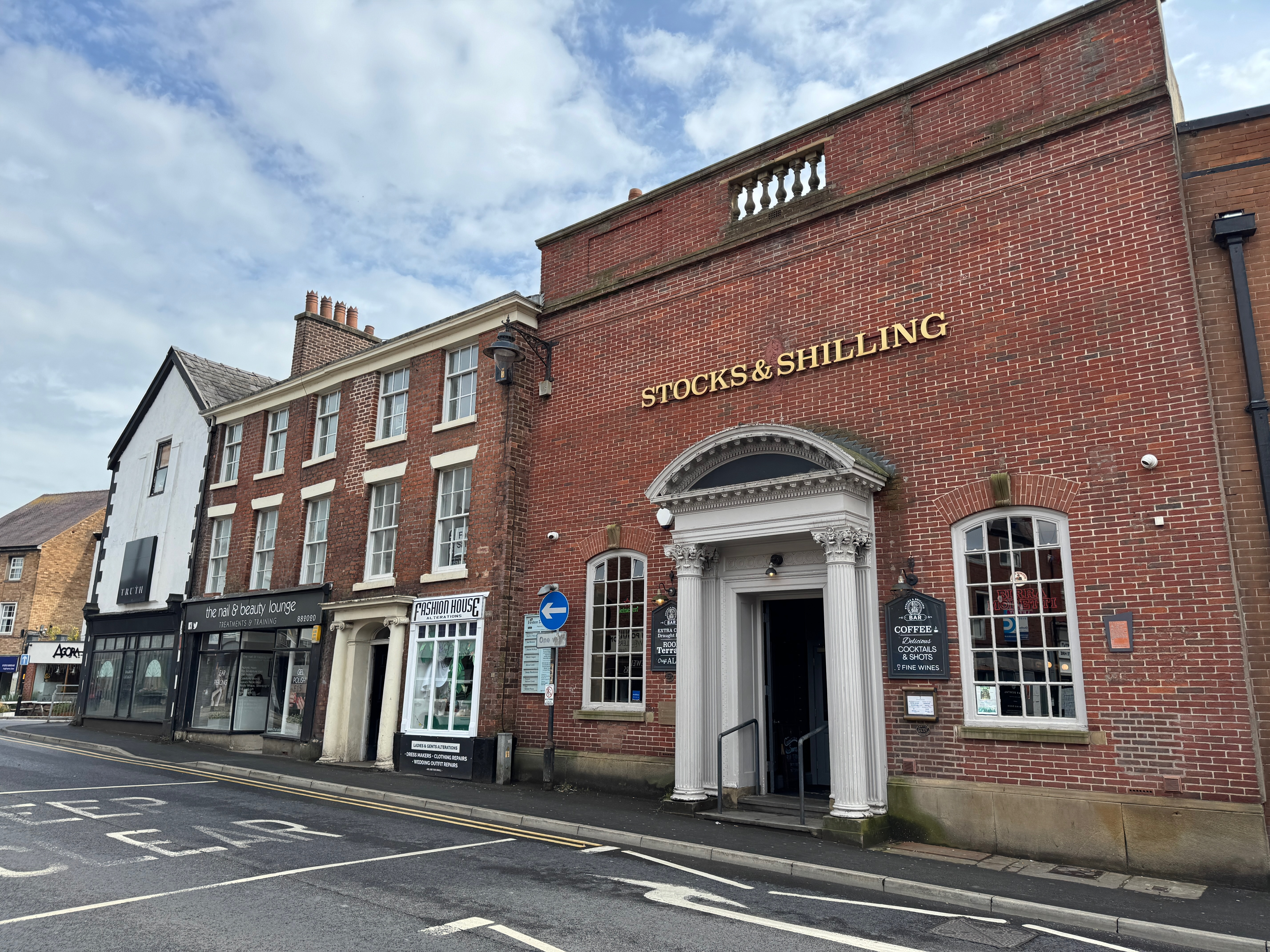
23–33 Market Place, on the southern side of Blackpool Old Road
