= Murder of Rachel McLean =

British student at St. Hilda's College in Oxford, England (1971–1991)

Rachel McLean
- Born: August 1971; Blackpool, England
- Died: 14 April 1991 (aged 19); Oxford, England
- Cause of death: Murder by strangulation
- Education: University of Oxford; Blackpool Sixth Form College
- Occupation: Student
- Parent(s): Malcolm and Joan McLean
- Relatives: David McLean (brother); Peter McLean (brother)

Rachel Margaret McLean (August 1971 – 14 April 1991) was a British student at St. Hilda's College in Oxford, England, when she was murdered by her boyfriend, John Tanner, a day after she had refused his marriage proposal. In the aftermath, Tanner concocted ruses in an attempt to avoid suspicion and elaborated a series of lies in an attempt to confuse the crime investigation and outwit the police.

McLean, who was born in the English town of Blackpool and raised in nearby Carleton, was a second-year student studying English Language at St. Hilda's when Tanner, a 22-year-old British-born New Zealand national, strangled her on 14 April 1991 and hid her body under the floorboards of her house.

== Murder ==
On the evening of 13 April 1991, Tanner was due to arrive in Oxford by train at 6 p.m. McLean, 19 years old, went to meet him at the station. Discovering that the train had been delayed, she returned home. At around 7:30 p.m., Tanner arrived at the house by taxi. The following day was FA Cup semi-finals day in football, and McLean and Tanner, an avid Nottingham Forest fan, planned to spend the day at home. She studied in the front room while he watched the game on television. Afterwards, the couple were seen by neighbours outside the house at around 4:30 p.m., which was the last time McLean was seen alive.

Later that evening, Tanner strangled McLean, then forced her head face down and tied a ligature around her neck. In his confession, Tanner told detectives that he spent several hours looking for a hiding place for the body in the house. It took police searchers seventeen days to locate the body hidden in an eight-inch-high gap at the back of a cupboard under the stairs, crammed with household junk. After emptying the cupboard's contents, Tanner had dragged McLean's body, clothed in ski pants and a T-shirt, from the adjacent bedroom, along the hall, and into the recess under the floor. He then crawled along under the hallway to hide the body under the floorboards of her bedroom.

The Evening Gazette's 5 December 1991 front-page headline of the murder.

== Aftermath ==
Tanner left the house the next day to return to Nottingham, where he was a classics student at the city's University of Nottingham. He was seen by a passenger on the 5 p.m. bus bound for Oxford railway station. As he waited for the 6:30 p.m. train to Nottingham, Tanner penned a love letter to McLean, which he later posted to her 25 Argyle Street address. In the letter, he stated how fortunate it was she had been met by a long-haired man who had offered her a lift home from the station when they were going their separate ways. On 16 April, Tanner telephoned Rachel's home but there was no answer. He tried again the following evening and was answered by Victoria Clare, McLean's 20-year-old housemate. Tanner asked to speak to McLean, but Clare said she knew nothing of her whereabouts. Tanner's letter arrived on 18 April, and Tanner called the house again that evening, asking for McLean.

By 19 April, five days after she was last seen, McLean's friends had begun to wonder where she was. She was due to attend a meeting with her tutor that morning to discuss work for the new term and sit a pre-term exam at St. Hilda's in the afternoon. A phone call to McLean's family in Lancashire confirmed that she had been left in Oxford the previous weekend.

== Investigation ==
College authorities notified police about McLean's apparent disappearance. Initially, the inquiry was low-key, as Oxford police received dozens of reports of missing students every month. McLean's description – 5 ft 6 in tall, slim, fresh complexion, shoulder-length ginger-auburn hair and brown eyes – was circulated to local patrols. On 21 April, after the Criminal Investigation Department (CID) took control of the inquiry, an initial search of McLean's house was made by detectives. There was nothing to suggest she had come to any harm at the house; an examination of the floorboards showed they had not been tampered with.

McLean's disappearance was made public knowledge on 22 April. Tanner spoke from his home in Lenton, Nottingham, and said how he had given McLean a farewell kiss on platform 2 of Oxford railway station as he boarded his train home. He also explained how he and McLean had been joined by a long-haired man as they sat drinking coffee in the station concourse. He said the stranger seemed to know McLean well and offered her a lift home. McLean's parents, Joan and Malcolm, took part in a press conference on 24 April and appealed for help in finding their daughter. Police had briefed journalists at the conference to pose questions to Tanner that would ultimately reinforce their suspicion that Tanner was involved in the disappearance. Meanwhile, searches continued around Argyle Street and nearby scrubland, and police frogmen dragged the River Cherwell. Police issued a photofit picture of the man whom Tanner claimed to have met at Oxford station, but nobody came forward to place him at the station with McLean and Tanner.

By 28 April, police were now convinced that McLean was dead, and ordered search teams to examine sewers and cess pits around the area of Argyle Street. The following day, Tanner surprised police by agreeing to take part in a press conference and reconstruction of what he claimed were their final movements. During an hour-long re-enactment, with PC Helen Kay playing McLean's role, Tanner posed in the station café, strolled along the platform and replayed the final embrace and kiss they shared before he boarded the train. Asked by a reporter if he thought she was still alive, Tanner stated: “In my heart of hearts I would like to think so”. As a result of the reconstruction, two independent witnesses placed Tanner at the station but not McLean. At the beginning of May, police contacted Oxfordshire County Council for details regarding the layout of houses in Argyle Street, particularly about their basements. They were told that there were no basements in the houses, but an official remembered the houses were underpinned, which meant there were cavities under the floors.

A day later, on 2 May, McLean's body was found shortly before 5:30 p.m. It was covered in pieces of carpet, but due to the low spring temperatures, there was no decomposition. Within the hour, Tanner was arrested at a pub in Nottingham; he initially refused to answer any police questions.

== Sentencing and release ==
Confronted with the evidence gathered by the police, Tanner broke down and admitted killing his girlfriend. Tanner appeared before Oxford magistrates on 4 May and was charged with the murder. During a four-day trial at Birmingham Crown Court, in which he pleaded not guilty, Tanner said that McLean had told him she had been unfaithful and wanted to end the relationship. "I flew at her in a rage and proceeded to put my hands around her neck…I think I must have lost control, because I have only a vague recollection of the time that elapsed afterwards. I am bewildered why I have done such a terrible thing to a person I love dearly." On 6 December 1991, the jury returned a majority verdict of 10 to 2 and Tanner was given a life sentence. In early 2003 after serving only little more than 11 years of his life sentence, Tanner was released from jail and returned to live in Whanganui, New Zealand. He is a graduate of Whanganui Collegiate School. He then continued his Classics degree at Victoria University of Wellington and graduated in 2005.

In 2018, Tanner was jailed for assaulting his partner.

== McLean's personal life ==
At the time, Joan, Rachel's mother, was head of foreign language at Hodgson High School in Poulton-le-Fylde. Her father, Malcolm, was a British Aerospace engineer. Rachel was the oldest of three children, born before two brothers. Prior to gaining a place at St. Hilda's College, McLean attended Blackpool Sixth Form College. McLean met Tanner as she celebrated her 19th birthday at her home. Ten months later, on 13 April 1991, Tanner proposed to McLean, but she turned him down. After McLean's murder, it emerged that Tanner felt increasingly threatened by her life away from his in Nottingham, and she found his obsessiveness too restrictive.

On 12 May, a memorial service was held at Oxford's University Church of St Mary the Virgin, attended by 400 family and friends, and on 29 May, a funeral service was held at Poulton Methodist Church.

In her memory, each year St Hilda's College awards the Rachel McLean Prize for students who have "improved college life and/or raised the profile of the college within the university".

== Media ==
A documentary, "Love You to Death", part of ITV's Real Crime series, was aired in 2004, with Thea Rowland portraying Rachel McLean and Noah Huntley playing John Tanner.

== See also ==
- Lists of solved missing person cases
