= Dan Forshaw =

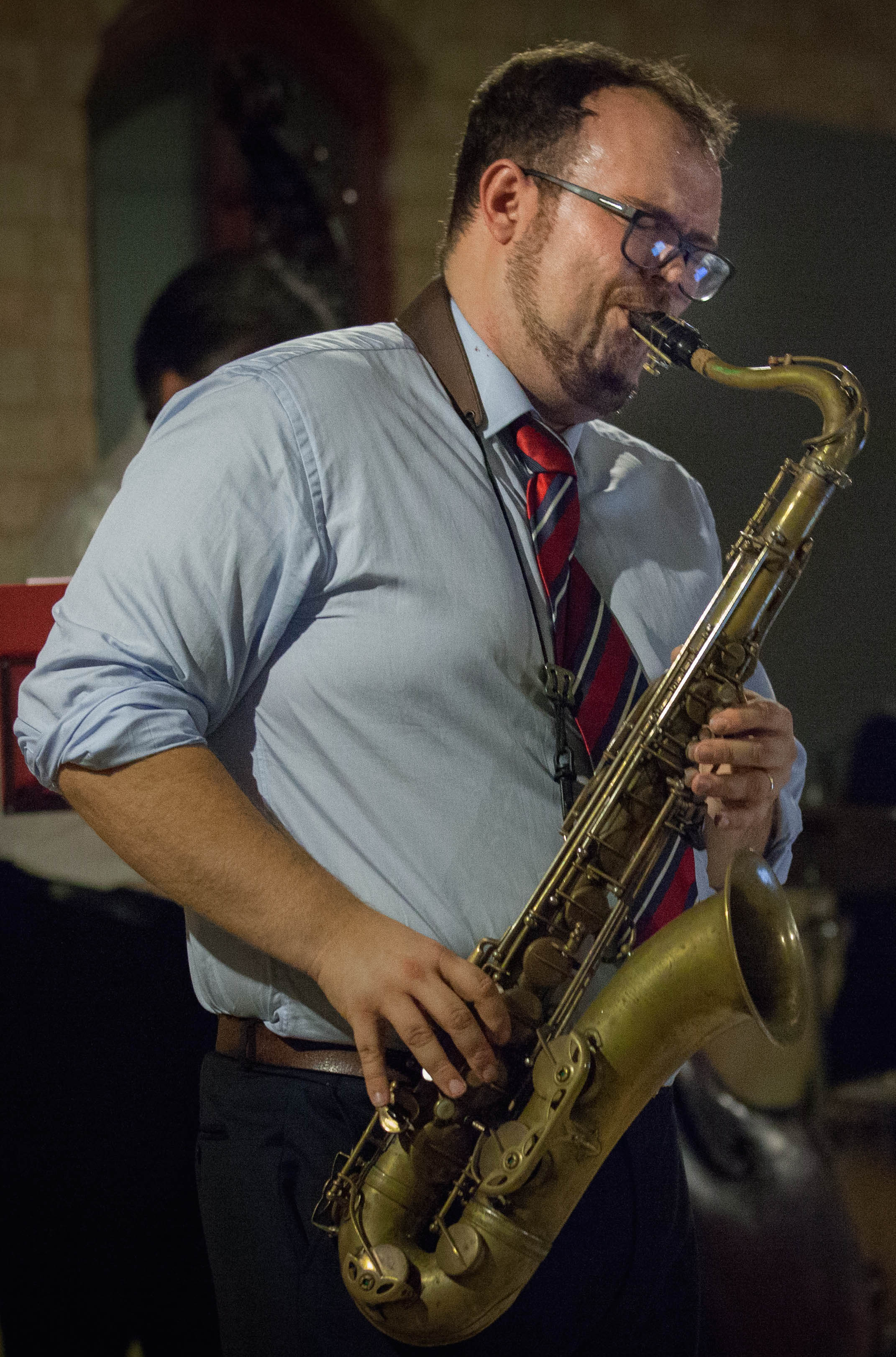
- Dan Forshaw

Background information
- Born: 19 May 1981 (age 45); Blackpool, Lancashire, England
- Genres: Jazz, blues, avant garde
- Occupation: Musician
- Instrument: Saxophone
- Years active: 1997–present
- Labels: 4shaw Music, ReHab

Dan Forshaw (born 1981) is an English jazz musician and music educator who started his career aged sixteen. He plays the tenor, soprano and alto saxophone and has also recorded on bass clarinet and the Electronic Wind Instrument or EWI. He is a passionate advocate for improving and facilitating music education for both adults and children, and is a figure in the digital revolution sweeping through music education.

== Background ==
Forshaw was born in Blackpool, Lancashire, into a musical family. He grew up in nearby Fleetwood and began playing piano at an early age. He attended Stanah Primary School, in Thornton, where he first started playing the clarinet aged seven. He progressed onto the saxophone aged ten, before attending St. Aidan's C of E High School in Preesall near Poulton-le-Fylde, and then onto the Blackpool Sixth Form College, where he starred in their big band. He later studied music and politics at Lancaster University.

== Career ==
Dan Forshaw

Forshaw's first professional gig was with 'The Amazing Blues Brothers Soul Revue' with whom he appeared across the UK and Europe. Dan then became director of Big Party, an event management and promotion company, before leaving in 2002 when he was appointed Director of Jazz studies at the Beecham Music School, Rossall School in Fleetwood.

In 2005 Forshaw traveled to New York City, where he studied with saxophonist, composer and bandleader, Branford Marsalis, saxophonist Eric Alexander and post-bop jazz saxophonist, Ravi Coltrane. Upon returning from New York, Forshaw moved from Blackpool to London. During his time in London he studied at the London School of Theology (LST). Whilst at LST he was also the music co-ordinator at Beechen Grove Baptist Church in Watford and a private music tutor in Harefield.

In January 2008 the Dan Forshaw Quartet performed their Jazz: Loving the Supreme project, which was the culmination of Dan's studies at London School of Theology. The work was based on the seminal John Coltrane album A Love Supreme and was performed in the chapel at the LST.

In February 2008, Dan was appointed as Artistic director, and Artist in residence at Urban Soul, May Street Church, Belfast in Northern Ireland. Whilst living in Northern Ireland Dan also toured with Pop artist Yazz and was active on the small, but vibrant Irish Jazz Scene. Forshaw continued to perform at many jazz festivals across the UK, including the Southport International Jazz festival from 2002 - 2012.

In 2011 Forshaw returned to England, where he joined the King / Cave project, an experimental liturgical group fusing jazz, progressive rock and Anglican liturgy. The group have performed all over the UK and beyond, notable performances being at St. Paul's Cathedral, London, Hereford Cathedral and Greenbelt Festival. Forshaw also created his own Jazz Vespers project which traces the history of jazz and blue music using readings, poetry and song to tell the story of lament and redemption, this was most notably given at Ely Cathedral in October 2013 and Methodist Central Hall, Westminster as part of Black History Month in October 2014. In 2016 Forshaw released 'Jazz Vespers' which features some of the best UK Jazz talent including Tony Kofi, Juliet Kelly and Steve Fishwick.

In 2015 Forshaw was part of the critically acclaimed 'Passion - a contemporary journey to the cross' which fused Dance, Poetry and Music which toured six UK cathedrals and appeared at the Edinburgh Fringe Festival.

Forshaw lived in Cambridgeshire from 2011 - 2025 where he founded a Music Education programme called 'Cambridge Saxophone.com,' which enabled students from all over the world, (including one student in Antarctica) to study with him. Forshaw was a Lecturer in Music at the London School of Theology also taught saxophone for Cambridge University and maintained an active performing schedule across the UK and Europe. In 2025 Forshaw moved to South West London where he continues to perform and teach.

In 2026 Forshaw toured Coltrane 100, a year-long project marking the centenary of John Coltrane. It opened at the Pizza Express Jazz club in Soho in February and went on to venues across the UK including Saffron Hall, Peggy's Skylight in Nottingham, Matt and Phreds in Manchester as well as the 50th Mananan Festival on the Isle of Man.

== Discography ==
As leader

- 2003 Question 21 - ReHab Records
- 2005 Live at the Villa - ReHab Records
- 2005 Time Stood Still (with Mike Taylor) - 4shaw Music
- 2006 Message (with Chris Smith) - 4shaw Music
- 2007 Language of Emotion 4shaw Music
- 2008 Live in London EP 4shaw Music
- 2009 No Jazz Please, We're British 4shaw Music
- 2011 Metanarrative 4shaw Music
- 2011 Come Sunday 4shaw Music
- 2013 What if Rupert Murdoch Liked Jazz?
- 2014 #jazztrio
- 2016 Jazz Vespers
- 2027 The Long Way Here

As a sideman

- 2001 K:OLN Espionage
- 2003 Jamestown Sound Didn't realise I was so close to the edge
- 2005 The Sound of Superstring Meanwhile, back at the Ranch
- 2011 DJ Yammin
- 2014 "Darn Funk Orchestra"
- 2015 Frankly Finbarr
