= Arnold Beckett =

British pharmacist (1920–2010)

Arnold Heyworth Beckett (12 February 1920 – 25 January 2010) was a British pharmacist, academic, and expert on doping in sport.

== Early life ==
Beckett was born on 12 February 1920 in The Fylde, Lancashire, England. He was educated at Baines School, then a grammar school in Poulton-le-Fylde. He studied at the School of Pharmacy and Birkbeck College, both part of the University of London. He completed his Bachelor of Science (BSc) degree in 1947 and his Doctor of Philosophy (PhD) degree in 1950. He took, but failed, the Civil Service entrance examination.

== Career ==
Beckett rose to prominence in the 1970s and 1980s when steroid use amongst athletes was banned from certain competitions. He participated in several high-profile investigations such as Canadian sprinter Ben Johnson who was ultimately stripped of his Olympic gold medal for testing positive for the drugs in 1988. After controversial rulings were delivered following the 1992 Barcelona Olympics, Beckett resigned from the medical commission and ultimately became an advocate for athletes accused of doping.

== Honours ==
In July 1976, Beckett was awarded an honorary Doctor of Science (D.Sc.) degree by Heriot-Watt University.
