= Shelter Island Conference on Quantum Mechanics in Valence Theory, 1951 =

Shelter Island Conference on Quantum Mechanics in Valence Theory was a chemistry conference held in 1951. It was sponsored by the National Academy of Sciences.

The Nobel laureate Robert S. Mulliken organized the meeting. The other participants were

- Theodore H. Berlin,
- Bryce Crawford,
- Charles Coulson,
- Henry Eyring,
- Joseph O. Hirschfelder,
- George E. Kimball,
- Masao Kotani,
- John Lennard-Jones,
- Per-Olov Löwdin,
- Duncan A. MacInnes,
- Henry Margenau,
- Joseph Edward Mayer,
- William Moffitt,
- Robert Parr,
- Linus Pauling,
- Kenneth Pitzer,
- Clemens C. J. Roothaan,
- Klaus Ruedenberg,
- Harrison Shull,
- John C. Slater,
- Leslie E. Sutton,
- C. W. Ufford,
- John Hasbrouch Van Vleck,
- George W. Wheland,
- and Michael P. Barnett.

In 1981, J.C. Light wrote, in an issue of The Journal of Physical Chemistry, that it presented papers from a conference that was "merely the latest in a long sequence of ... conferences ... on theoretical chemistry spanning 3 decades ..." followed by a list that began with the Shelter Island conference. In 1996, Parr wrote "The fall of 1951 was an exciting time for quantum chemistry ... the Shelter Island Conference on Quantum-Mechanical Methods in Valence Theory ... was singularly important ... ".
