= Tony Green (footballer) =

Scottish footballer (born 1946)

Personal information
- Full name: Anthony Green
- Date of birth: 30 October 1946 (age 80)
- Place of birth: Glasgow, Scotland
- Position: Attacking midfielder

Youth career
- 19??–1964: St. Mungo's Academy

Senior career*
Years	Team	Apps	(Gls)
1964–1967	Albion Rovers	64	(21)
1967–1971	Blackpool	123	(13)
1971–1973	Newcastle United	33	(3)
Total		220	(37)

International career
1971–1972	Scotland	6	(0)
- * Club domestic league appearances and goals

Anthony Green (born 30 October 1946) is a Scottish former internationalist professional footballer. At the age of 25 his career ended prematurely in September 1972 due to an injury he received playing for Newcastle United.

== Albion Rovers ==
Green was born in Glasgow and began his professional career nearby at Albion Rovers in Coatbridge who he joined from school. Green studied maths at the Paisley College of Technology while playing for Albion Rovers. A slightly built, quick, skilful attacker, he was playing internationally at the time for the Scottish youth team set up with whom he formed a left sided attacking partnership with Lex Law. Green joined Rovers in the belief he would play first team football at an earlier age than he would playing for a bigger club.

== Blackpool ==
Green transferred just before the end of the season in May 1967 to Blackpool for an initial £13,500 on a four-year contract. Albion would receive a further £2,000 when he had played in twenty first-team games. Blackpool were already condemned to relegation from the top flight when Green debuted in the last game of the season 3–1 defeat away to Liverpool.

His enduring recollection of his time at Bloomfield Road was being denied promotion back to the top flight on goal difference in season 1967–68 finishing third behind Ipswich Town and Queen's Park Rangers. "We'd won at Huddersfield and thought we were up. Our supporters crowded onto the field and were going daft but we got back in the dressing room to find that QPR had scored a winner in the last minute against Aston Villa. They'd been losing with ten minutes left," said Green.

Green suffered an Achilles injury that kept him out of the game for a year. In his time out the team Blackpool won promotion back to the top flight. His return to the fold came on 19 September 1970 for the visit of Everton to Bloomfield Road. His profile increased that season when he scored two goals in a 4–0 home televised FA Cup third round win against West Ham United. The first was a solo run into the penalty area and the second was a left foot drive high into the net from just outside the penalty area. Blackpool were relegated at the end of that season back in the top tier. In their last league game of the season Green scored in the 1–1 draw against Manchester United.

Blackpool that season won the 1971 Anglo-Italian Cup. Blackpool defeated A.S. Roma and Hellas Verona both in Italy to earn a trip away to play at AC Bologna in the final. Blackpool came from behind to win 2–1.

Green was inducted into the Hall of Fame at Bloomfield Road, when it was officially opened by former Blackpool player Jimmy Armfield in April 2006.

== Newcastle United ==
In the month of his 25th birthday, October 1971 after him putting in a transfer request, Newcastle United took Blackpool's Scottish internationalist back to England's top tier. Newcastle made a £150,000 offer in a part-exchange deal involving Keith Dyson. Green became Newcastle's second most expensive signing, after Malcolm Macdonald who had signed in May the same year from Luton Town for £180,000. Green's debut was away at Everton on 30 October 1971. The 1–0 defeat put Newcastle bottom of England's top tier at that time after what had been their fifth consecutive defeat. Green scored though in the next game, a 3–1 home win against Southampton. Newcastle's revival for that season was under way to start an unbeaten run of five wins and two draws. The Geordies climbed the table to finish eleventh. Macdonald with 30 goals from 52 games was the primary beneficiary of the team's attacking skills. Green was the brains and drive of the team. In a 2–0 victory at Manchester United, Green was instrumental in creating both goals. The first was a precision chip over a defender to release Stewart Barrowclough to centre for John Tudor to score. The second was a box to box solo run that left George Best on the deck in Green's wake. Green crossed for Barrowclough to score.

On 2 September 1972 Green suffered a knee cartilage injury that ultimately ended his professional football career the month before his 26th birthday. His competitive career at Newcastle lasted only 39 games (33 in the league) spanning 11 months in which he was idolised by the Geordie fans. Green later said of the injury, "I was finished at the age of 25 by a tackle from Crystal Palace's Mel Blyth but I honestly think it was an accident, not malicious. Nowadays I would have been out for a month to five weeks because I would have been in hospital the next day. However, in the seventies I was in a splint for six weeks running up and down the St James' Park terraces and was then allocated a general surgeon, the club vice-chairman Bob Rutherford, instead of an orthopedic surgeon."

United got their £150,000 back through an insurance company after Green's retirement at Christmas 1973, but it was little consolation. Newcastle manager Joe Harvey said: "After they made Tony Green, they threw away the mould. I couldn't hope to buy a similar player, not even for twice the amount." Harvey said of the day of Green's retirement from football, "It was the saddest day of my life. He was my very best buy." In a minor irony Newcastle that season won the 1973 Anglo-Italian Cup that Green had won two seasons before.

In 2008 Green said: "You think about things for about six months, and you look back wistfully. But in a way, I'm glad that if I had to finish like I did, I did it at Newcastle. I had a chance to play for a big club every week, in front of big crowds. You can't regret that. I'd have loved to have played on, but if you keep looking back it would drive you crackers."

Green was inducted into a black and white Hall of Fame at the Toon Reunion at Dunston's Lancastrian Suite on 9 July 2008 at the age of 61.

== International career ==
Green made six appearances for the Scotland national football team between February 1971 and May 1972.

== After playing ==
After his football career ended Green became a maths teacher. He taught at Hodgson High School in Poulton-le-Fylde, Lancashire, and later at Millfield High School, in nearby Thornton.

Between 1975 and 2022, he served on the Pools Panel, a three-strong panel of experts who predict results of postponed football fixtures.

He currently lives in Poulton-le-Fylde with his wife, Christine.

== Honours ==
- Blackpool – 1971 Anglo-Italian Cup
