= Samuel Lomas =

English clockmaker

- Died: 1793
- Citizenship: United Kingdom
- Occupation: Clockmaker

Samuel Lomas (died May 1793) was an English clockmaker, active in the mid-to-late 18th century.

== Life and career ==
Lomas married Elizabeth, with whom he had six known children. Four of them died within five years of each other: daughters Margaret (died 1767), Agnes (1773) and Betty (1774), and sons Samuel Jr (1764), John (1776) and James (1778).

In November 1736, Lomas was listed as an apprentice to John Royle, a clockmaker and watchmaker based in Great Bolton, Lancashire. Eight years later, he was working out of a "smithy" behind his home at 21 Sheaf Street (today's Hardhorn Road) in Poulton-le-Fylde, next door to the Wheatsheaf Inn. The inn was demolished. He is recorded as being "Poulton's clockmaker c. 1744 – c. 1792". His engraving was Lomas Poolton.

== Death ==
Lomas died in May 1793. He was interred in the graveyard of St Chad's Church in Poulton-le-Fylde on 30 May. His widow survived him by two years, and was buried beside him on 3 March 1795.
