= Poulton Curve Halt railway station =

Station in Lancashire, UK (1909–52)

Poulton Curve
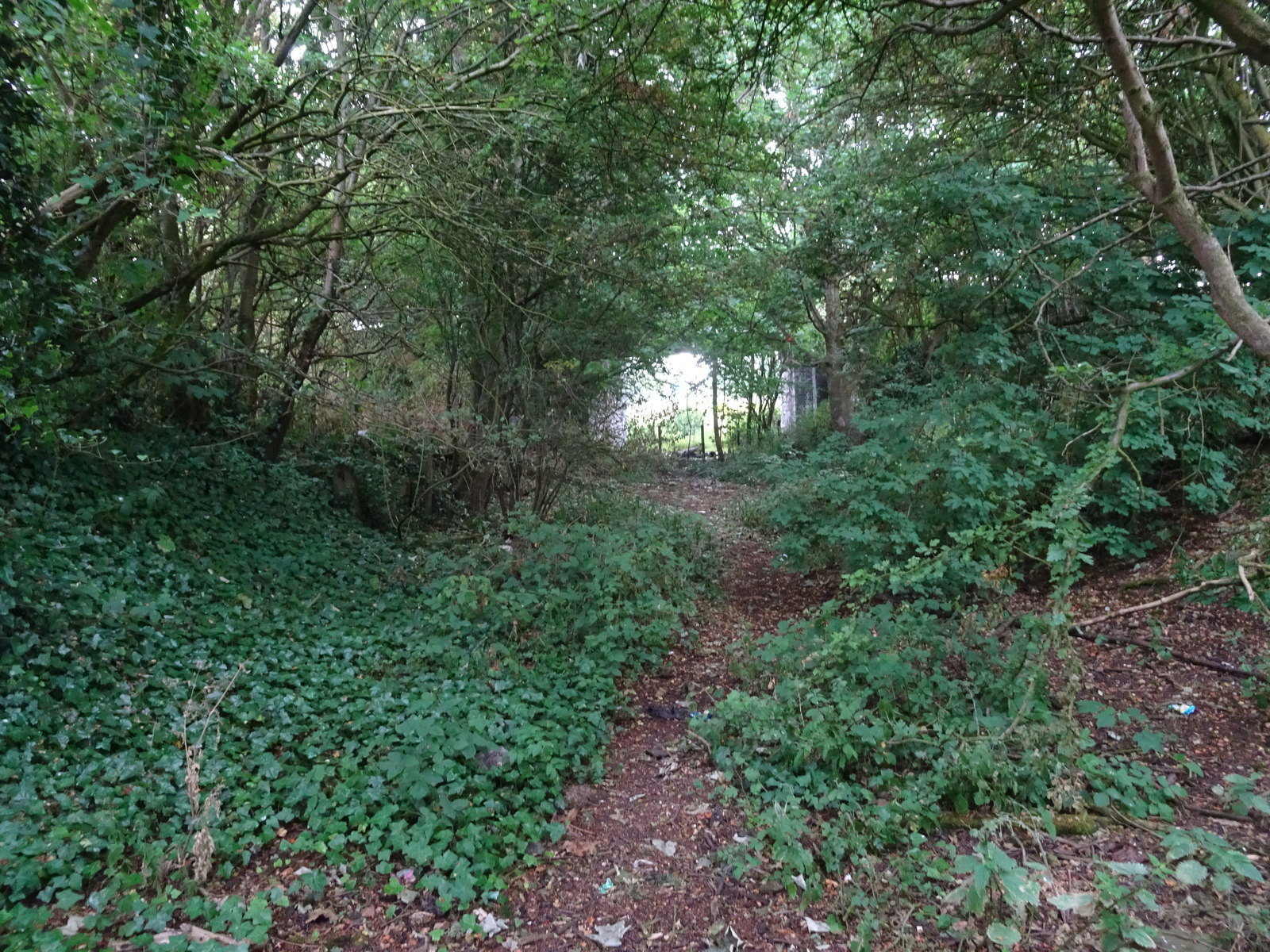
- Site of the former station (2018)

General information
- Location: Poulton-le-Fylde, Wyre; England
- Coordinates: 53.8499°N 2.9974°W
- Platforms: 2

Other information
- Status: Disused

History
- Original company: Lancashire and Yorkshire Railway / London and North Western Railway
- Pre-grouping: LYR / LNWR

Key dates
- 1 February 1909: Opened
- 1 July 1952: Closed
Location
- Location within the Borough of Wyre Location within Lancashire

Poulton Curve was a halt on the Fleetwood-to-Blackpool railway line in Lancashire, England.

On 1 July 1899 a new curve was opened at Poulton-le-Fylde to complete the triangle of lines between Kirkham, Fleetwood and Blackpool. Poulton Curve Halt was opened on this section on 1 February 1909. It closed on 1 July 1952.

Railways in Poulton-le-Fylde. The dates refer to passenger services.

Preceding station	Disused railways	Following station
Layton	Preston and Wyre; Joint Railway; Fleetwood Branch Line	Thornton for Cleveleys
