= Lucy Fallon =

British actress (born 1995)

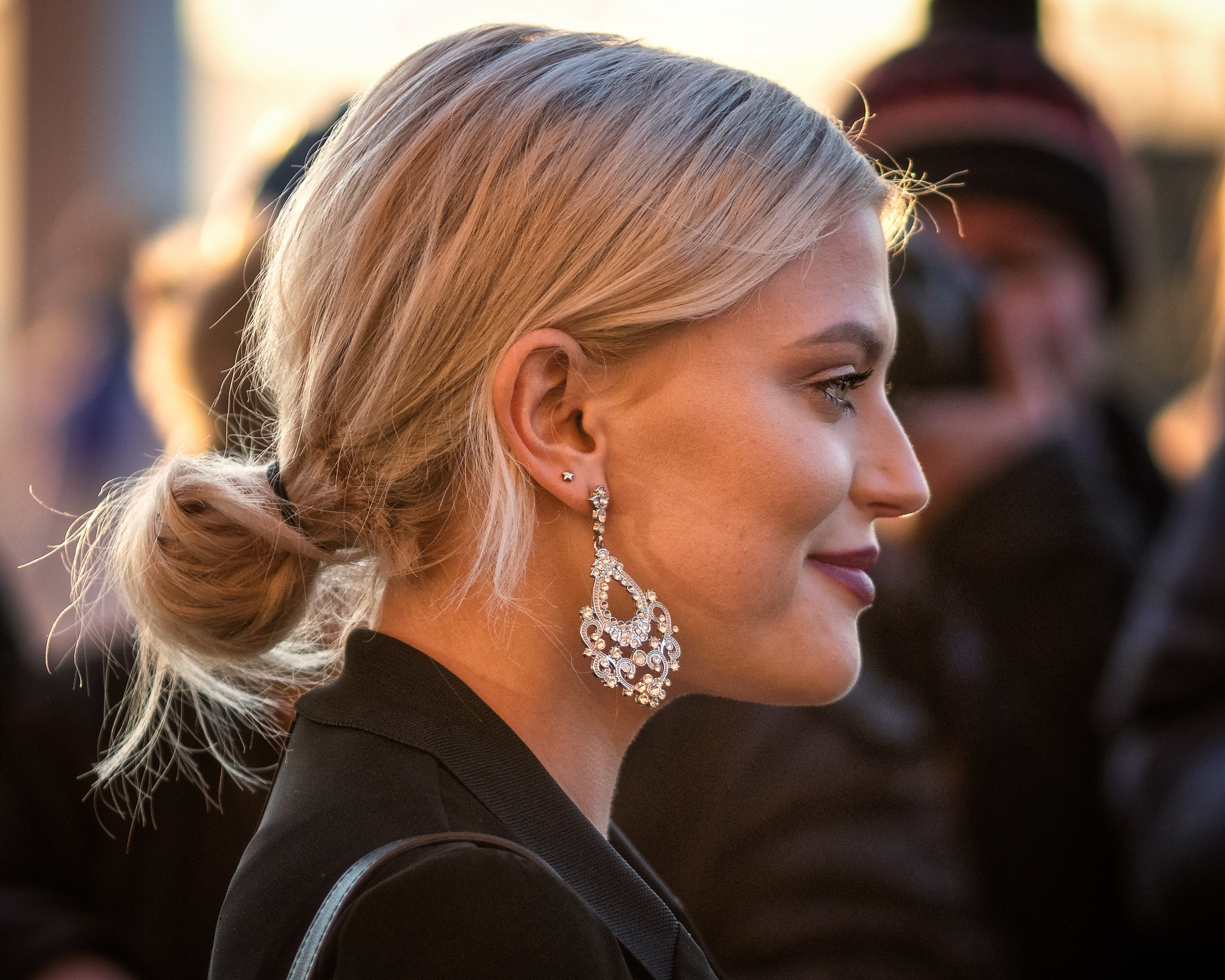
- Fallon in 2018
- Born: 13 November 1995 (age 30); Blackpool, Lancashire, England
- Occupation: Actress
- Years active: 2015–present
- Known for: Role of Bethany Platt in Coronation Street
- Partner(s): Ryan Ledson (2020–present; engaged)
- Children: 2

Lucy Fallon (born 13 November 1995) is an English actress. She gained widespread recognition as Bethany Platt in the ITV soap opera Coronation Street (2015–2020, 2023–present). The role has earned her several accolades, including two British Soap Awards, an Inside Soap Award, and a National Television Award.

== Early life ==
Lucy Fallon was born on 13 November 1995 in Blackpool, Lancashire, to engineer Andrew Fallon and accountant Angela Fallon. She grew up in Cleveleys, Lancashire, and has two older sisters.

From the age of two, Fallon studied singing, dancing and drama at the Barbara Jackson Theatre Arts Centre; since the age of eight, she had private drama classes, and also took the London Academy of Music and Dramatic Art (LAMDA) exams. She first went to Hodgson Academy, and then attended the Blackpool Sixth Form College, where she achieved a Distinction Star and two Distinctions in BTEC Extended Diploma Performing Arts. For financial reasons, she declined offers from the Mountview Academy of Theatre Arts and ArtsEd to study musical theatre.

Before landing her role in Coronation Street, Fallon had several part-time jobs, including working at Subway, Next, New Look, and in the Merrie England bar on the Blackpool North Pier. At the same time, she appeared as a dancer in the pantomime Sleeping Beauty at the Blackpool Grand Theatre.

== Career ==
=== Coronation Street ===
"Walking onto the set was surreal and nerve wracking, but everyone has been really welcoming and I am thrilled to have been given this great opportunity."

— Fallon on being cast as Bethany

Fallon made her professional acting debut in 2015 when she was cast as Bethany Platt, the daughter of Sarah Platt (Tina O'Brien), in the ITV soap opera Coronation Street. A returning character, Bethany had been played by child actors Mia Cookson (2000) and twins Amy and Emily Walton (2000–2007), before Fallon took over. She was 19 when she was cast to play the 14-year-old Bethany. She was offered the role after it emerged that Katie Redford, the actress who was originally chosen for the part, had lied about her age.

Fallon described Bethany as "a bit of a wild child. She's very feisty, but she does a lot of it to get a reaction." The Guardian's Hannah Verdier thought that she was "perfect" for the role and that her comedic skills were a "reincarnation of Joan Rivers, only with a Mancunian accent"; however, Steven D. Wright from the same newspaper felt that she was "far too old for her part." While on the soap, Fallon's character was involved in a highly publicised grooming and sexual exploitation storyline, which earned Fallon widespread acclaim. Barbara Ellen of The Guardian found her performance "immaculate", while Daily Mirror's Ian Hyland wrote that scenes which saw Bethany survive a kidnapping to testify in court against her abuser gave Fallon "another chance to show what a fine actress she has become." Fallon won the Best Actress award at the 2017 Inside Soap Awards, the Outstanding Serial Drama Performance at the 2018 National Television Awards, and the Best Actress and Best Female Dramatic Performance at the 2018 British Soap Awards.

Fallon left Coronation Street at the end of her contract in 2020 to pursue other projects, and her final appearance aired on 4 March 2020. In August 2023, it was reported that she would reprise her role in the series. Her on-screen return was broadcast on New Year's Eve 2023.

=== Other endeavours ===
Fallon competed in the ITV Christmas special All Star Musicals which aired on 24 December 2017 and was voted the winner for her rendition of "Don't Cry for Me Argentina" from the musical Evita. She was a contestant on the ITV reality miniseries Don't Rock the Boat in November 2020.

Fallon starred as George alongside Pearl Mackie in the 2021 Audible horror series Sour Hall, set and recorded on a Yorkshire farm, which tells the story of a lesbian couple tormented by a Boggart. She was also cast in the titular role of Jazz in that year's BBC Radio 4 drama titled Jazz and Dice. Fallon next appeared as Molly Seagrim in the 2023 miniseries reimagining of Henry Fielding's novel The History of Tom Jones, a Foundling titled Tom Jones.

In 2024, she starred in the ITVBe reality series Drama Queens.

== Personal life ==
Fallon has been in a relationship with footballer Ryan Ledson since 2020. Having suffered a miscarriage in March 2022, she became pregnant again later that year, and gave birth to their son on 30 January 2023. Their second child, a daughter, was born on 11 January 2025. Fallon and Ledson became engaged in November 2025.

== Filmography ==
=== Television ===
Year	Title	Role	Notes	Ref.
2015–2020, 2023–present	Coronation Street	Bethany Platt	Regular role	
2017	All Star Musicals	Herself	Contestant; winner	
2018	The Chase: Celebrity Special	Herself	Contestant	
2020	Britain's Brightest Celebrity Family	Herself	Contestant	
2020	Don't Rock the Boat	Herself	Contestant	
2023	Tom Jones	Molly Seagrim	Miniseries; 2 episodes	
2024	Pointless Celebrities	Herself	Contestant	
2024	Drama Queens	Herself	Main role	
2026	Celebrity Lingo	Herself	Contestant	

=== Radio ===
Year	Title	Role	Ref.
2021	Jazz and Dice	Jazz	

=== Audio ===
Year	Title	Role	Notes	Ref.
2021	Sour Hall	George	Audible series	

== Awards and nominations ==
Year	Award	Category	Work	Result	Ref.
2015	TV Choice Awards	Best Soap Newcomer	Coronation Street	Nominated	
2015	Inside Soap Awards	Best Newcomer	Coronation Street	Nominated	
2017	British Soap Awards	Best Actress	Coronation Street	Nominated	
2017	TV Choice Awards	Best Soap Actress	Coronation Street	Nominated	
2017	Inside Soap Awards	Best Actress	Coronation Street	Won	
2017	Inside Soap Awards	Best Partnership (shared with Colson Smith)	Coronation Street	Nominated	
2017	RTS North West Awards	Best Performance in a Continuing Drama	Coronation Street	Nominated	
2017	Digital Spy Reader Awards	Best Soap Actress	Coronation Street	Second	
2018	National Television Awards	Outstanding Serial Drama Performance	Coronation Street	Won	
2018	TRIC Awards	Best Soap Actor	Coronation Street	Nominated	
2018	British Soap Awards	Best Actress	Coronation Street	Won	
2018	British Soap Awards	Best Female Dramatic Performance	Coronation Street	Won	
2018	TV Choice Awards	Best Soap Actress	Coronation Street	Nominated	
2018	Inside Soap Awards	Best Actress	Coronation Street	Nominated	
