= Blackpool Sixth Form College =

The Blackpool Sixth Form College

Location
- Blackpool Old Road; Blackpool, Lancashire, FY3 7LR; England; 53°50′24″N 3°01′00″W

Information
- Type: Sixth form college
- Established: 1971
- Local authority: Blackpool
- Department for Education URN: 130744 Tables
- Ofsted: Reports
- Principal: Nicola Craven
- Gender: Co-educational
- Age: 16 to 19
- Enrolment: 2000 (approx.)
- Colours: Purple, grey
- Website: blackpoolsixth.ac.uk

The Blackpool Sixth Form College is a co-educational state funded sixth form college serving the Fylde and surrounding areas in Lancashire, England. The college has around 2,000 full-time students. It offers academic and applied programmes to a wide range of students aged between 16 and 19.

== Location ==
The campus is sited in the Highfurlong district of Blackpool. This places it on Blackpool's extreme eastern boundary, about 3 miles (4.8 km) from the coast and close to the neighbouring town of Poulton-le-Fylde.

== Education and college life ==
Over sixty A-levels are available to full-time students. Until 2004, the college specialised in the A-level qualification almost exclusively; however, the college has gradually introduced BTECs for students to take at the same level. The curriculum areas cover the traditional academic subjects—arts, sciences, languages, economics and mathematics—as well as more modern courses, such as film and television production and criminology.

The college's performing arts and music students frequently deliver productions in the college theatre, which can seat 300 guests.

Students can also participate in wide range of recreational activities. The college has seventeen sports teams, and also a basketball academy and a Duke of Edinburgh Award scheme.

In October 2024 the college joined the Costal Collaorative Trust

== History ==
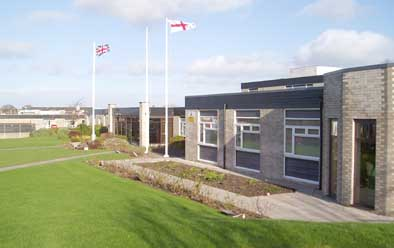
Former buildings, since demolished

The college was opened in 1971 as a dedicated sixth form centre for the nearby Collegiate Grammar School, although it has always attracted students from other schools across the Fylde and beyond. In 1989, the sixth form centre controversially separated from the main school to become a fully independent college. Since then, the number of students has increased and the campus has been extended by several new buildings.

2004 saw the opening of the new Performing Arts building, the Holland building, comprising specialist music and dance facilities, new Social Sciences and History accommodation and extensions to the library and common-room areas.

In 2011, Blackpool Sixth Form College was also awarded Teaching School Status in partnership with nearby Hodgson Academy.

Building works, which began in 2011, were finished in Summer 2015, after £29 million was spent on the project.

== Principals ==
There have been seven principals in the college's history:

- Joan Wilkinson (1971–1983)
- Robert Farrand (1983–1989)
- Christopher Fulford (1989–2000)
- Jeffrey Holland (2000–2004)
- Felicity Greeves (2004–2015)
- Jill Gray (2015–2024)
- Nicola Craven (2024–)

== The Blackpool Sixth Form College Alumni Society ==
The college has an Alumni Society for former students, staff and governors.

== Notable former students ==
- Barney Harwood, children's television presenter
- Dan Forshaw, musician
- Little Boots (Victoria Hesketh), musician
- John Robb, musician
- Lucy Fallon, actress
- Justine Moore, paralympic fencer
