= Baines School =

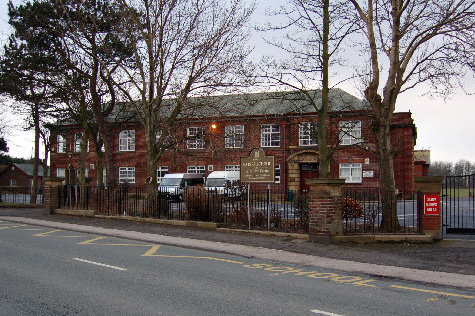

Location
- Highcross Road; Poulton-le-Fylde, Lancashire, FY6 8BE; England
- 53.8364°N 2.9934°W

Information
- Type: Voluntary aided Comprehensive school
- Motto: Nil Sine Labore (Nothing Without Effort)
- Established: 1717
- Local authority: Lancashire
- Department for Education URN: 119813 Tables
- Ofsted: Reports
- Gender: Coeducational
- Age: 11 to 16
- Website: https://baines.lancs.sch.uk/

Baines School is a secondary school in Poulton-Le-Fylde, Lancashire, England. It was founded through the will of James Baines in 1717 and is a former grammar school.

It was one of three schools set up in Baines' will, the others being at Marton and Thornton. teaching around 100 pupils without charging fees. Baines will also provided payments to the poor of the area and apprenticeships.

The current intake of the school is around 170 pupils each year, producing a total population of around 900 pupils.

== Notable former pupils ==
- Joe-Warren Plant, child actor, best known for his role of Jacob Gallagher in Emmerdale
- Michael P Barnett, chemist and computer scientist
- Arnold Beckett, pharmacist, and expert on doping in sport
- Daniel Whiston, professional ice skater
- Ian Stuart Donaldson, Neo-Nazi musician
- Barry Mason, songwriter
- Dave Durie, professional footballer
- Fred Pagnam, professional footballer
- Richard Gleeson, professional cricketer
- Clive Grunshaw, Police & Crime Commissioner, Lancashire
