= Stanah Primary School =

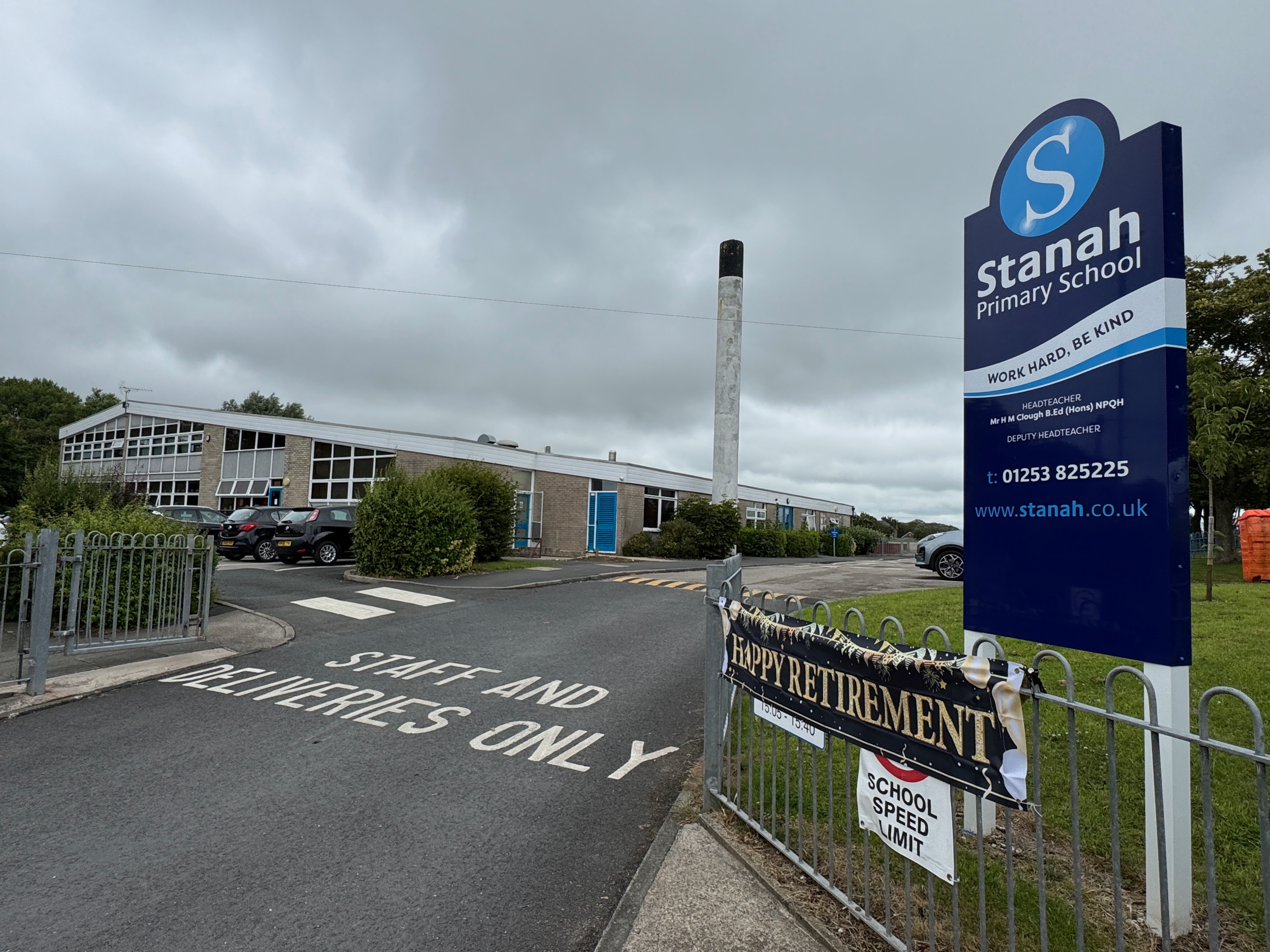
- A 2024 view of the main school building from the entrance to the car park, which separates the two school buildings

Location
- Lambs Road; Thornton, Lancashire, FY5 5JR; England
- Coordinates: 53.8719°N 2.9920°W

Information
- Former names: Stanch County Primary School; Stanah Community Primary School
- Type: Community primary school
- Motto: Work hard, be kind
- Local authority: Lancashire
- Department for Education URN: 119296 Tables
- Ofsted: Reports
- Head teacher: Rachel Legge
- Gender: Coeducational
- Age: 4 to 11
- Enrolment: c. 400
- Colours: Blue and white
- Website: http://www.stanah.co.uk

Stanah Primary School (formerly Stanah County Primary School and Stanah Community Primary School) is a mixed primary school located in the Stanah area of Thornton, Lancashire, England

Built in the 1960s, the school, located on Lambs Road (or, as it is known locally, Lambs Hill), has around 400 pupils, aged 4 to 11. Its head teacher is Rachel Legge, who succeeded H. M. Clough. Clough replaced Ian Todd who, after three-and-a-half years as head, took up a position at the University of Cumbria in January 2010. Mr. Todd's predecessor was Tony Ford, who retired in the summer of 2006 after twelve years in the role. One of the earlier and long-serving head teachers was Jean Fisher. Another was Mr. Evans, who was headmaster in the 1970s.

The school comprises two separate prefabricated buildings. A smaller annex (infants) is attended by the foundation class and years 1 and 2. For year 3, the children move into the larger main building (juniors). The smaller building was mothballed in the early 1980s when school rolls dropped, but it was renovated and reopened around a decade later. The infants building also houses a preschool nursery originally called Stanah Sunflowers but which was then bought and renamed to Oak Tree Nursery.

On the junior's building stands the school's distinctive chimney.

== Notable people ==
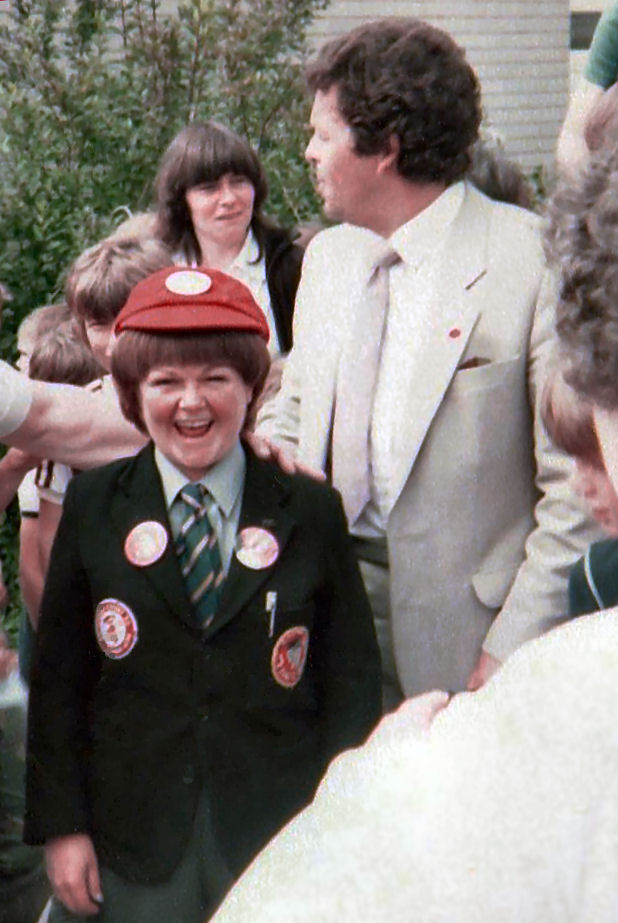
The Krankies visiting Stanah in the early 1980s. This photograph was taken at the rear of the smaller school building.

The Krankies (pictured) visited Stanah for a summer fair in the early 1980s. Leslie Crowther also visited around the same time. Jazz musician Dan Forshaw attended the school from 1988 to 1992, and it was in the school wind band that he first picked up his instrument. The school has also been visited by multiple authors, including Hazel Townson and Dan Worsley.
