= Michael P. Barnett =

British theoretical chemist and computer scientist

Michael Peter Barnett (24 March 1929 – 13 March 2012) was a British theoretical chemist and computer scientist. He developed mathematical and computer techniques for quantum chemical problems, and some of the earliest software for several other kinds of computer application. After his early days in London, Essex and Lancashire, he went to King's College, London, in 1945, the Royal Radar Establishment in Malvern in 1953, IBM United Kingdom in 1955, the University of Wisconsin Department of Chemistry in 1957, and the Massachusetts Institute of Technology Solid State and Molecular Theory Group in 1958.

At MIT he was an associate professor of physics and director of the Cooperative Computing Laboratory. He returned to England, to the Institute of Computer Science of the University of London in 1964, and then back to United States the following year. He worked in industry, and taught at Columbia University 1975–77 and Brooklyn College, City University of New York, 1977–96, retiring as an emeritus professor. After retirement he focused on symbolic calculation in quantum chemistry and nuclear magnetic resonance.

== Early life and career ==
Barnett spent most of the World War II years near Fleetwood in Lancashire. He attended Baines' Grammar School in Poulton-le-Fylde, then went to King's College, London in 1945, where he received a BSc in chemistry in 1948, a PhD for work in the theoretical physics department with Charles Coulson in 1952, that he continued on a one-year post-doctoral fellowship. His assigned project was to determine if electrostatic forces could account for the energy needed to make two parts of an ethane molecule rotate around the bond that joins them.

This work required the evaluation of certain mathematical objects – molecular integrals over Slater orbitals. Barnett extended some earlier work by Charles Coulson by discovering some recurrence formulas, that are part of a method of analysis and computation frequently referred to as the Barnett-Coulson expansion. Molecular integrals remain a significant problem in quantum chemistry and continued to be one of Barnett's main interests.

Two years after Barnett started this work, he was invited to be one of the twenty-five participants in a conference that was organised by Robert Mulliken, sponsored by the National Academy of Sciences and known, from its venue, as the Shelter Island Conference on Quantum Mechanics in Valence Theory. Barnett's attendance was enabled by the British Rayon Research Association, which supported his post-graduate work.

At the Royal Radar Establishment, Barnett held a Senior Government Fellowship. He worked on aspects of theoretical solid state physics, that included the properties of organic semiconductors. As part of his work at IBM United Kingdom, he directed an IBM model 650 computer centre. He directed and participated in numerous projects that included (1) calculating DNA structures from crystallographic data, and (2) simulations to plan the location and operation of dams and reservoirs on the River Nile, working with Humphry Morrice, the hydrological advisor to the Government of the Sudan, and his predecessor, Nimmo Allen.

In 1957, Barnett accepted an invitation from Joseph Hirschfelder, in the Chemistry department of the University of Wisconsin–Madison, to work on mathematical theories of combustion and detonation.

== Activities at MIT ==
In 1958, John Clarke Slater invited Barnett to join his Solid State and Molecular Theory Group. He was made an associate professor of physics in 1960 and, in 1962, set up an IBM 709 installation, the Cooperative Computing Laboratory (CCL). This supported heavy computations by several groups at MIT. The SSMTG used much of the time for molecular and solid state research, attracting many post-doctoral workers from the United Kingdom and Canada,.

The calculations of quantum chemistry involve approximate solutions of the Schrödinger equation. Many methods for computing these require molecular integrals that are defined for systems of 2, 3 and 4 atoms, respectively. The 4-atom (or 4-centre) integrals are by far the most difficult. By extending the methods of his PhD papers, Barnett developed a detailed methodology for evaluating all of these integrals These were coded in FORTRAN, in software that was available to the IBM mainframe community through the SHARE organisation. Members of the SSMTG who developed and used these programs included Donald Ellis, Russell Pitzer and Donald Merrifield.

In 1960, Barnett started to extend a technique he had learned from Frank Boys to program a computer to construct coded mathematical formulas. He needed a way to typeset these. A Photon machine, equipped with paper provided an immediate solution. Barnett developed software to typeset computer output, and applied this to documents containing mathematical formulas and to a wide range of other typesetting problems. He produced books for the MIT Libraries, and with Imre Izs·k, the Smithsonian Astrophysical Observatory. The work of his team and the parallel work of other groups through 1964 is described in his monograph.

Barnett also began to develop his ideas on cognitive modelling, as a member of Frank Schmitt's seminar on biological memory. He wrote on river simulation as a member of the Harvard Water Resources seminar (see for related work. He, John Iliffe, Robert Futrelle, Paul Fehder, George Coulouris and other members of the CCL worked on parsing, text processing (the precursor of word processing), programming language constructs, scientific visualisation, and further topics that melded into the computer science of later years.

== Institute of Computer Science ==
In 1963, Barnett accepted an appointment as reader in information processing at the Institute of Computer Science in the University of London, and, while he was still at Massachusetts Institute of Technology, the Department of Scientific and Industrial Research (DSIR) awarded him a grant, to be taken up in London, to continue his work on computer typesetting, that was publicised by the director, Richard A. Buckingham. His return received further publicity as a "reverse brain drain". He worked extensively with printing trade union officials and the staff of training colleges, to provide understanding of the new methods and their potential (pages 208–218 of his book). His concern with social aspects of technological innovation is noted in a detailed book review. He served on the Information Committee of the DSIR.

Asked about university research in England, in a BBC interview on his arrival in 1964, he said "the trouble was deeper than money ... Frustration is caused by concentration of power in the hands of a few." His deepening concern about entrepreneurial activity in academe intensified, (Section 10.6 of his book.)

== Industry, Columbia and CUNY ==
After a year at the Institute of Computer Science, Barnett went back to the US He joined the newly formed Graphic Systems Division of RCA, to create software for commercial computer typesetting. RCA acquired the US rights to the Digiset machine of Rudolf Hell and marketed an adaptation as the Videocomp. About 50 were sold. Barnett designed the algorithmic markup language PAGE-1 to express complicated formats in full page composition. This was used for a wide range of typeset products that included, over the years, the Social Sciences Index of the H. W. Wilson Company and several other publications excerpted in a later review paper., The application to database publishing led Barnett to devise and implement a programming language, that he called SNAP, to express file handling operations as sequences of grammatical English sentences.

In 1969, Barnett joined the H. W. Wilson Company, a publisher of bibliographic tools for libraries, to automate the production of these. He designed and introduced the system that was used to produce the Social Sciences Index for about 10 years. He had also started to teach courses on library automation at the Columbia School of Library Service. He joined the Columbia faculty full-time in 1975.

In 1977, Barnett moved to the Department of Computer and Information Science at Brooklyn College of the City University of New York in 1977, retiring as professor emeritus in 1996. Whilst at CUNY, he directed a major NSF funded project to develop computer generated printed matter for undergraduate teaching. He wrote software that incorporated pictures in documents that were typeset using PAGE-1. He wrote several books with his three teenage children, Gabrielle, Simon and Graham, aimed at the home market. These dealt with the production of computer graphics on early personal computers, that included the Commodore 64, the Apple II, and IBM PC, and the use of elementary algorithms.

== Integrals redux, retirement and symbolic calculation ==
In 1989, Barnett started to spend part of his time as a visiting scientist at the John von Neumann National Supercomputer Center, located on the outskirts of Princeton and run by a consortium of universities. He restarted work on molecular integrals, using the power of the supercomputer to go beyond the possibilities of the 1960s. After his retirement from CUNY, he continued to explore applications of symbolic calculation to molecular integrals, nuclear magnetic resonance, and other topics.
