= Hodgson Academy =

Location
- Moorland Road; Poulton-le-Fylde; Lancashire, FY6 7EU; England; 53.8476°N 2.98146°W

Information
- Type: Academy
- Established: 5 September 1932
- Local authority: Lancashire
- Department for Education URN: 136717 Tables
- Ofsted: Reports
- Headteacher: Shabnam Khan
- Gender: Coeducational
- Age: 11 to 16
- Enrolment: 1122
- Website: http://www.hodgson.lancs.sch.uk/

Hodgson Academy (formerly Hodgson School) is a coeducational secondary school located in Poulton-le-Fylde in the English county of Lancashire.

Hodgson was inspected by the office for standards in education (OFSTED) and was rated Good overall - only Outstanding in personal development - leading to a change in the school as seen by all pupils past and present. New measurements had to be brought in including the GCSE course being reduced from 3 years to 2 years, and will show a disparity from the gap.

Throughout its over 90-year history, Hodgson has grown its building and has made changes to the premises, including building a greenhouse-style canteen being made the Garden Diner replacing the previous Express Diner with new maths classrooms and a new Headteacher's office. Another change is the academy's Inclusion room (designed for students to prevent unacceptable behaviour and conduct, and reintegrate them back into Academy life), changing from the first floor of the Pastoral Block to next door of the Headteacher's office, before being moved to between the Music and French classrooms.

Hodgson Academy offers GCSEs, BTECs and some AS Level courses as programmes of study for pupils. Most graduating pupils go on to attend Blackpool Sixth Form College or Blackpool and the Fylde College.

== History ==
The school was established in 1932 and was named after Alderman William Hodgson JP, who was chairman of Lancashire Education Authority at this time.

The school converted to academy status in May 2011 and was renamed Hodgson Academy.

== Notable former staff ==
- Tony Green, footballer

== Notable former students ==
- Lucy Fallon, actress
- Josh Feeney, footballer for Aston Villa
