= Blackpool Borough Council elections =

English local elections

Blackpool Borough Council elections are generally held every four years. Blackpool Borough Council (which styles itself "Blackpool Council") is the local authority for the unitary authority of Blackpool in Lancashire, England. Since the last boundary changes in 2023, 42 councillors have been elected from 21 wards.

== Council elections ==
=== Blackpool County Borough Council (1904-1974) ===
- 1958 Blackpool Borough Council election

=== Blackpool District Council (1974-1998) ===
- 1973 Blackpool Borough Council election
- 1976 Blackpool Borough Council election (New ward boundaries)
- 1979 Blackpool Borough Council election
- 1983 Blackpool Borough Council election
- 1987 Blackpool Borough Council election
- 1991 Blackpool Borough Council election
- 1995 Blackpool Borough Council election

=== Blackpool Council (1998-present) ===
- 1997 Blackpool Borough Council election (New ward boundaries)
- 2000 Blackpool Borough Council election
- 2003 Blackpool Borough Council election (New ward boundaries reduced the number of seats by 2)
- 2007 Blackpool Borough Council election
- 2011 Blackpool Borough Council election
- 2015 Blackpool Borough Council election
- 2019 Blackpool Borough Council election
- 2023 Blackpool Borough Council Election (New ward boundaries)

== Wards ==
The Borough of Blackpool is divided into 21 wards.

== Borough result maps ==
2003 results map

2007 results map

2011 results map

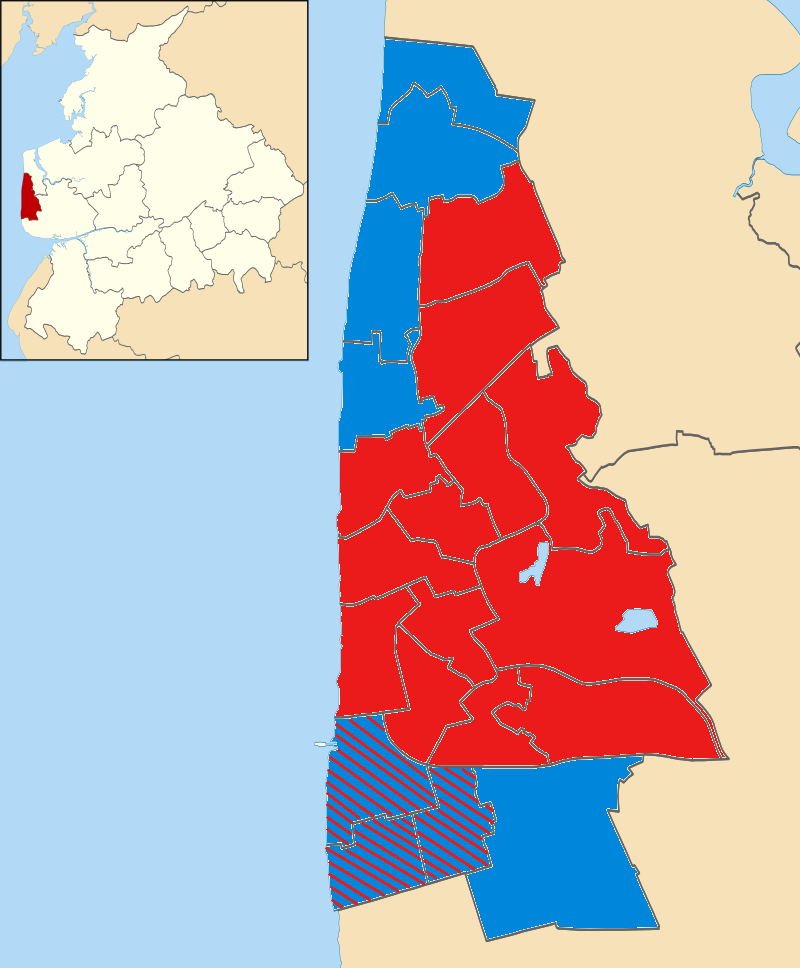
2015 results map

2019 results map

2023 results map

== By-election results ==
=== 1997–2000 ===
Marton By-Election 7 May 1998
Party	Candidate	Votes	%	±%
Conservative		963	48.1	+0.3
Labour		878	43.8	−8.4
Liberal Democrats		162	8.1	+8.1
Majority		85	4.3	
Turnout		2,003		
Conservative gain from Labour		Swing		

Waterloo By-Election 23 July 1998
Party	Candidate	Votes	%	±%
Conservative		532	36.8	−1.7
Liberal Democrats		468	32.4	+8.3
Labour		447	30.9	−6.6
Majority		64	4.4	
Turnout		1,447	30.8	
Conservative hold		Swing		

Ingthorpe By-Election 21 January 1999
Party	Candidate	Votes	%	±%
Labour		914	63.2	+1.5
Conservative		533	36.8	−1.5
Majority		381	26.4	
Turnout		1,447	26	
Labour hold		Swing		

=== 2000–2003 ===
Waterloo By-Election 7 June 2001
Party	Candidate	Votes	%	±%
Labour	Carol Radcliffe	859	33.1	+1.7
Conservative	John Herdman	833	32.1	−9.5
Liberal Democrats	Ian Coleman	696	26.8	−0.3
Independent	Ann Edwards	208	8.0	+8.0
Majority		26	1.0	
Turnout		2,596		
Labour gain from Conservative		Swing		

Brunswick By-Election 13 September 2001
Party	Candidate	Votes	%	±%
Labour	Barry Cresswell	515	53.5	−9.5
Liberal Democrats	Steven Bate	255	26.5	+26.5
Conservative	Andrew Stansfield	135	14.0	−23.0
First Alliance	Kenneht Coups	38	3.9	+3.9
Independent	Charles Thomas	20	2.1	+2.1
Majority		260	27.0	
Turnout		963	20	
Labour hold		Swing		

=== 2007–2011 ===
Park By-Election 26 June 2008
Party	Candidate	Votes	%	±%
Conservative	Peter Collins	977	55.2	+28.1
Labour	Roy Fisher	448	25.3	−8.1
BNP	Les Joy	218	12.3	−4.8
Liberal Democrats	Susan Close	97	5.5	−8.5
UKIP	Colin Porter	30	1.7	−6.7
Majority		529	29.9	
Turnout		1,770		
Conservative gain from Labour		Swing		

Stanley By-Election 20 August 2009
Party	Candidate	Votes	%	±%
Conservative	Jean Kenrick	648	32.8	−28.2
Labour	John Jones	602	30.5	+4.6
Liberal Democrats	Michael Hodkinson	332	16.8	+3.6
UKIP	Colin Porter	203	10.3	+10.3
BNP	Les Joy	192	9.7	+9.7
Majority		46	2.3	
Turnout		1,977	36.4	
Conservative hold		Swing		

=== 2011–2015 ===
Waterloo by-election 9 October 2014
Party	Candidate	Votes	%	±%
Conservative	Derek Robertson	406	34.5	−5.3
UKIP	John Braithwaite	372	31.6	N/A
Labour	Kathy Ellis	347	29.5	−17.5
Liberal Democrats	Mike Hodkinson	34	2.9	−10.3
BNP	Jack Renshaw	17	1.4	N/A
Majority		34	2.9	
Turnout			22.2	−12.4
Conservative hold		Swing		

The by-election was triggered by the death of Conservative Councillor Tony Lee

=== 2015-2019 ===
Bloomfield by-election 3 March 2016
Party	Candidate	Votes	%	±%
Labour	Jim Hobson	450	57.6	+12.8
Conservative	Tony Jones	150	19.2	−0.7
UKIP	Spencer Shackleton	118	15.1	−10.0
Green	Phill Armstrong	32	4.1	−4.6
Liberal Democrats	Neil Close	31	4.0	+4.0
Majority		300	38.4	
Turnout		781		
Labour hold		Swing		

Tyldesley by-election 29 September 2016
Party	Candidate	Votes	%	±%
Labour	David Collett	535	48.3	+10.0
Conservative	Moira Graham	297	26.8	−2.4
UKIP	Kim Knight	238	21.5	−0.5
Liberal Democrats	Paul Hindley	37	3.3	−2.3
Majority		238	21.5	
Turnout		1,107		
Labour hold		Swing		

Warbreck by-election 16 March 2017
Party	Candidate	Votes	%	±%
Conservative	Michele Scott	728	54.8	+17.5
Labour	Ian Treasure	468	35.2	+6.2
UKIP	Walter Cairns	75	5.6	−13.5
Liberal Democrats	Kevan Benfold	57	4.3	−2.8
Majority		260	19.6	
Turnout		1,328		
Conservative hold		Swing		

=== 2019-2023 ===
Highfield by-election 6 May 2021
Party	Candidate	Votes	%	±%
Conservative	Bradley Mitchell	982	54.9	+6.0
Labour	Christine Wright	498	27.8	−23.3
Independent	Rob Wynne	192	10.7	+10.7
Green	Becky Daniels	55	3.1	+3.1
Reform	Kim Knight	40	2.2	+2.2
Liberal Democrats	Bill Greene	22	1.2	+1.2
Majority		484	27.1	
Turnout		1,789		
Conservative hold		Swing		

Norbreck by-election 6 May 2021
Party	Candidate	Votes	%	±%
Conservative	Julie Sloman	963	50.6	+18.9
Independent	Pam Haslam	480	25.2	+25.2
Labour	Julie Jones	378	19.9	+0.3
Liberal Democrats	Simon Jowitt	82	4.3	−6.0
Majority		483	25.4	
Turnout		1,903		
Conservative gain from Independent		Swing		

Greenlands by-election 17 November 2022
Party	Candidate	Votes	%	±%
Labour	Peter Wright	550	48.0	−0.1
Conservative	Jane Warne	518	45.2	−6.7
Liberal Democrats	Kev Benfold	77	6.7	+6.7
Majority		32	2.8	
Turnout		1,145		
Labour gain from Conservative		Swing		

=== 2023-2027 ===
Marton by-election 3 October 2024
Party	Candidate	Votes	%	±%
Reform	Jim O'Neill	462	38.8	+29.4
Labour	Sam Benson	334	28.0	−23.1
Conservative	Neil Harvey	254	21.3	−18.2
Independent	Andrew Stansfield	84	7.0	+7.0
Liberal Democrats	Bill Greene	33	2.8	+2.8
Green	Ben Thomas	25	2.1	+2.1
Majority		128	10.7	
Turnout		1,192		
Reform gain from Labour		Swing		

Andrew Stansfield stood as a Conservative in the 2023 election, receiving 40.0%.

Bispham by-election 7 November 2024
Party	Candidate	Votes	%	±%
Labour	Joel McKevitt	436	31.5	−16.6
Reform	William Banks	424	30.7	+30.7
Conservative	Lynda Watson	314	22.7	−29.2
Independent	Rick Scott	148	10.7	+10.7
Green	Ben Thomas	36	2.6	+2.6
Liberal Democrats	Kevan Benfold	24	1.7	+1.7
Majority		12	0.9	
Turnout		1,382		
Labour gain from Conservative		Swing		

Greenlands by-election 18 December 2025
Party	Candidate	Votes	%	±%
Reform	Jonathan Morgan	587	44.4	+38.3
Conservative	Rick Scott	299	22.6	−17.2
Labour	Hattie Tollerson	289	21.9	−22.7
Green	Brenden Wilkinson	79	6.0	−3.5
Liberal Democrats	Kev Benfold	45	3.4	+3.4
Independent	Jayden Gaskin	22	1.7	+1.7
Majority		288	21.8	
Turnout		1,321		
Reform gain from Labour		Swing		

Claremont by-election 1 October 2026
Party	Candidate	Votes	%	±%
Labour	Katie Donnelli-Hunn	458	41.8	−10.5
Reform	Mark Butcher	419	38.2	+38.2
Restore	Paula Brooksbank	79	7.2	+7.2
Conservative	John Thomson	62	5.7	−15.9
Green	Rob Jones	44	4.0	+4.0
Liberal Democrats	Kevan Benfold	18	1.6	−10.5
Independent	Kim Knight	16	1.5	+1.5
Majority		39	3.6	
Turnout		1,096		
Labour hold		Swing		
