= Tyldesley (surname) =

Tyldesley is a locational surname from Tyldesley, in Greater Manchester, England. Notable people with this surname include:

- Addin Tyldesley (1878–1962), English swimmer
- Catherine Tyldesley (born 1983), English actress
- Clive Tyldesley (born 1954), English sports broadcaster
- Dick Tyldesley (1897–1943), English cricketer
- Elizabeth Tyldesley (1585–1654), English abbess
- Ernest Tyldesley (1889–1962), English cricketer
- Esther Tyldesley, British academic
- Harry Tyldesley (1893–1935), English cricketer
- James Tyldesley (1889–1923), English cricketer
- James Tyldesley Kendall (1916–1991), American chemist
- Johnny Tyldesley (1873–1930), English cricketer
- Joyce Tyldesley (born 1960), British archaeologist
- Thomas Tyldesley (1612–1651), English royalist commander
- Thurstan Tyldesley (died 1554), English politician
- William Tyldesley (1887–1918), English cricketer

== See also ==
- Tildesley
