= 2011 Blackpool Borough Council election =

English local election

2011 Blackpool Council election
← 2007	5 May 2011	2015 →

All 42 council seats
- Turnout: 37.41%
	First party	Second party
Leader	Simon Blackburn	Peter Callow
Party	Labour	Conservative
Leader since	2009
Last election	12 seats, 34.4%	27 seats, 47.3%
Seats won	27	14
Seat change	▲15	▼13
Popular vote	38,828	32,024
Percentage	50.2%	41.4%
Swing	▲15.8%	▼5.9%
Leader of Largest Party before election
Peter Callow
Conservative
Subsequent Leader of Largest Party
Simon Blackburn
Labour

Map of results of 2011 election

The 2011 Blackpool Borough Council election took place on 5 May 2011 to elect members of the unitary Blackpool Borough Council in England. The whole council was up for election and the Labour Party gained overall control of the council from the Conservative Party.

== Election result ==
The results saw Blackpool Labour gain 15 seats to take control from the Conservatives. Conservative councillors who lost seats included the deputy leader of the party Ian Fowler and the cabinet member for education, Peter Collins. Meanwhile, the Liberal Democrats were reduced to just one councillor, Douglas Green. Overall turnout at the election was 37.41%.

The Conservative leader of the council Peter Callow said the Labour result was "well-earned" and that cuts made by the national government were to blame for the Conservative losses. Meanwhile, the Labour leader Simon Blackburn called the result "very pleasing, but not unexpected".

Blackpool local election result 2011
Party	Seats	Gains	Losses	Net gain/loss	Seats %	Votes %	Votes	+/−
Labour	27	15	0	+15	64.3	50.2	38,828	+15.8
Conservative	14	1	14	-13	33.3	41.4	32,024	-5.9
Liberal Democrats	1	0	2	-2	2.4	5.2	4,010	-8.7
UKIP	0	0	0	0	0.0	2.0	1,511	+1.5
Independent	0	0	0	0	0.0	1.1	861	+0.8
Green	0	0	0	0	0.0	0.1	112	+0.1

== Ward results ==
=== Anchorsholme ===
Anchorsholme (2)
Party	Candidate	Votes	%	±%
Conservative	Tony Williams	1,202	25.49%	+6.18%
Conservative	Paul Galley	1,107	23.47%	+4.95%
Labour	Danny Bradford	970	20.57%	+7.05%
Labour	Rosemary Southern	883	18.72%	+4.49%
Liberal Democrats	Jon Bamborough	318	6.74%	−11.37%
Liberal Democrats	Gill Jackson	236	5.00%	−11.30%
Turnout			47.7	−2.0%
Conservative hold		Swing	+8.8%	
Conservative hold		Swing	+8.2%	

=== Bispham ===
Bispham (2)
Party	Candidate	Votes	%	±%
Conservative	Don Clapham	1,187	30.53%	−1.40%
Conservative	Henry Mitchell	1,065	27.40%	−3.21%
Labour	Kathryn Benson	743	19.11%	+7.05%
Labour	Bob Harrison	681	17.52%	+7.45%
Liberal Democrats	Anne Heyworth	211	5.43%	−1.11%
Turnout			41.7	−3.0%
Conservative hold		Swing	-4.2%	
Conservative hold		Swing	-5.4%	

=== Bloomfield ===
Bloomfield (2)
Party	Candidate	Votes	%	±%
Labour	Graham Cain	849	32.79%	+16.85%
Labour	Mary Smith	777	30.01%	+12.84%
Conservative	Irene James	322	12.44%	+1.59%
Conservative	Michael Ruane	282	10.89%	+1.52%
UKIP	Hamish Howitt	159	6.14%	−0.46%
UKIP	Len Booth	146	5.64%	+5.64%
Liberal Democrats	Michael Hodkinson	54	2.09%	−16.90%
Turnout			26.5	−3.4%
Labour hold		Swing	+7.5%	
Labour gain from Liberal Democrats		Swing	+16.9%	

=== Brunswick ===
Brunswick (2)
Party	Candidate	Votes	%	±%
Labour	Gary Coleman	1,059	31.73%	+4.90%
Labour	Simon Blackburn	1,049	31.43%	+5.31%
Conservative	Timothy Cox	472	14.14%	−6.15%
Conservative	Geoff Hodson	435	13.03%	−5.88%
UKIP	Robert McDowell	176	5.27%	+5.27%
UKIP	Colin Porter	147	4.40%	−3.45%
Turnout			33.8	+3.4%
Labour hold		Swing	+5.5%	
Labour hold		Swing	+5.6%	

=== Claremont ===
Claremont (2)
Party	Candidate	Votes	%	±%
Labour	Ivan Taylor	1,031	34.18%	+7.9%
Labour	Sylvia Taylor	965	32.00%	+8.6%
Conservative	Brian Bell	450	14.92%	−2.7%
Conservative	Ian Benson	419	13.89%	−2.2%
Liberal Democrats	David Charles-Cully	151	5.01%	−4.5%
Turnout			28.3	+0.5%
Labour hold		Swing	+5.3%	
Labour hold		Swing	+5.4%	

=== Clifton ===
Clifton (2)
Party	Candidate	Votes	%	±%
Labour	Joan Greenhalgh	1,090	33.39%	+8.69%
Labour	Adrian Hutton	911	27.91%	+6.23%
Conservative	Joe Best	567	17.37%	−5.73%
Conservative	Marlene Ruane	475	14.55%	−7.13%
Independent	Michael Carr	221	6.77%	−14.91%
Turnout			34.9	+0.2%
Labour hold		Swing	+7.2%	
Labour gain from Conservative		Swing	+6.7%	

=== Greenlands ===
Greenlands (2)
Party	Candidate	Votes	%	±%
Labour	Christine Wright	861	21.6%	+1.9%
Labour	Chris Ryan	851	21.4%	+4.2%
Conservative	Steve Houghton	816	20.5%	−3.3%
Conservative	Angela Brown	758	19.0%	−3.2%
Independent	Julian Mineur	295	7.4%	+7.4%
UKIP	John Bebbington	258	6.5%	+6.5%
Liberal Democrats	Carole Bate	142	3.6%	−1.7%
Turnout		3,981	40.4	−0.1%
Labour gain from Conservative		Swing	+2.6%	
Labour gain from Conservative		Swing	+3.2%	

=== Hawes Side ===
Hawes Side (2)
Party	Candidate	Votes	%	±%
Labour	Norman Hardy	1,244	34.6%	+12.8%
Labour	Val Haynes	1,177	32.7%	+11.8%
Conservative	Pam Knight	616	17.1%	−1.5%
Conservative	Bev Warren	563	14.4%	−0.9%
Turnout		3,600	35.4	−0.1%
Labour hold		Swing	+7.2%	
Labour hold		Swing	+6.4%	

=== Highfield ===
Highfield (2)
Party	Candidate	Votes	%	±%
Conservative	Lily Henderson	868	23.9%	−4.4%
Labour	Chris Maughan	849	23.3%	+9.2%
Conservative	Susan Fowler	777	21.4%	−6.7%
Labour	James Sorah	701	19.3%	+5.3%
Independent	Robert Mottershead	345	9.5%	+9.5%
Liberal Democrats	Robert Osinski	99	2.7%	−4.0%
Turnout		3,639	38.6	−5.8%
Conservative hold		Swing	-4.9%	
Labour gain from Conservative		Swing	+8.0%	

=== Ingthorpe ===
Ingthorpe (2)
Party	Candidate	Votes	%	±%
Labour	Kath Rowson	1,135	27.6%	+3.9%
Labour	Amy Cross	1,013	24.7%	+2.9%
Conservative	Sheila Haskett	633	15.4%	−8.7%
Conservative	Tony Normington	633	15.4%	−7.3%
Liberal Democrats	Steven Bate	477	11.6%	+3.9%
Liberal Democrats	Geoffrey Newman	215	5.2%	+5.2%
Turnout		4,106	42.4	−1.5%
Labour hold		Swing	+5.6%	
Labour gain from Conservative		Swing	+5.8%	

=== Layton ===
Layton (2)
Party	Candidate	Votes	%	±%
Labour	John Boughton	1,091	28.7%	+7.2%
Labour	Martin Mitchell	921	24.2%	+2.8%
Conservative	Sue Ridyard	837	22.0%	−3.6%
Conservative	Roy Haskett	817	21.5%	−2.1%
Liberal Democrats	Steven Farley	141	3.7%	−4.3%
Turnout		3,807	39.0	−2.5%
Labour gain from Conservative		Swing	+5.4%	
Labour gain from Conservative		Swing	+2.5%	

=== Marton ===
Marton (2)
Party	Candidate	Votes	%	±%
Conservative	Jim Houldsworth	997	25.7%	−0.5%
Labour	Debbie Coleman	984	25.4%	+12.7%
Labour	Jim Elmes	932	24.0%	+12.9%
Conservative	David Christy	816	21.0%	−5.3%
Liberal Democrats	Betty Newman	151	3.9%	−0.6%
Turnout		3,880	38.7	−9.3%
Conservative hold		Swing	-6.6%	
Labour gain from Conservative		Swing	+9.0%	

=== Norbreck ===
Norbreck (2)
Party	Candidate	Votes	%	±%
Conservative	Maxine Callow	1,467	31.5%	−6.0%
Conservative	Peter Callow	1,465	31.5%	−5.2%
Labour	Betty Bradford	886	19.0%	+8.7%
Labour	Roy Lewis	840	18.0%	+8.6%
Turnout		4,658	48.0	−0.2%
Conservative hold		Swing	-7.4%	
Conservative hold		Swing	-6.9%	

=== Park ===
Park (2)
Party	Candidate	Votes	%	±%
Labour	Gillian Campbell	1,084	30.3%	+9.2%
Labour	Brian Doherty	1,083	30.3%	+10.2%
Conservative	Peter Collins	784	21.9%	+4.8%
Conservative	Kevin Wilson	632	17.6%	+1.1%
Turnout		3,583	37.3	+4.8%
Labour hold		Swing	+7.0%	
Labour gain from Conservative		Swing	+5.6%	

=== Squires Gate ===
Squires Gate (2)
Party	Candidate	Votes	%	±%
Conservative	Christian Cox	821	21.1%	+7.4%
Liberal Democrats	Douglas Green	698	17.9%	−10.1%
Conservative	Richard Brodowski	653	16.8%	+2.9%
Labour	Pat Carson	636	16.4%	+9.1%
Labour	Robert Wood	624	16.0%	+10.0%
Liberal Democrats	Susan Close	457	11.8%	−18.4%
Turnout		3,889	40.3	−5.0%
Conservative gain from Liberal Democrats		Swing	+12.9%	
Liberal Democrats hold		Swing	-6.5%	

=== Stanley ===
Stanley (2)
Party	Candidate	Votes	%	±%
Conservative	Peter Evans	1,082	24.6%	−9.3%
Conservative	Andrew Stansfield	974	22.2%	−9.4%
Labour	Pamela Jackson	943	21.5%	+7.1%
Labour	John Jones	869	19.8%	+7.0%
UKIP	Jacqueline Bleeker	227	5.2%	+5.2%
UKIP	Martin Bleeker	213	4.8%	+4.8%
Liberal Democrats	Eric Close	88	2.0%	−5.3%
Turnout		4,396	43.4	+2.6%
Conservative hold		Swing	-8.2%	
Conservative hold		Swing	-8.2%	

=== Talbot ===
Talbot (2)
Party	Candidate	Votes	%	±%
Labour	Sarah Riding	892	29.0%	+8.2%
Labour	Mark Smith	854	27.8%	+8.1%
Conservative	Charlie Docherty	697	22.7%	−2.9%
Conservative	Mike Warren	629	20.5%	−4.4%
Turnout		3,072	29.9	+0.3%
Labour gain from Conservative		Swing	+5.6%	
Labour gain from Conservative		Swing	+6.3%	

=== Tyldesley ===
Tyldesley (2)
Party	Candidate	Votes	%	±%
Labour	Allan Matthews	1,137	31.6%	+9.4%
Labour	Eddie Collett	1,105	30.7%	+9.2%
Conservative	Jim Price	689	19.1%	−4.8%
Conservative	Roger Stansfield	667	18.5%	−4.5%
Turnout		3,598	35.6	+1.1%
Labour gain from Conservative		Swing	+7.1%	
Labour gain from Conservative		Swing	+ 6.9%	

=== Victoria ===
Victoria (2)
Party	Candidate	Votes	%	±%
Labour	Fred Jackson	1,221	37.1%	+10.7%
Labour	David Owen	1,088	33.1%	+10.8%
Conservative	Sharon Sanderson-Robert	519	15.8%	−2.0%
Conservative	Pat Francioni	461	14.0%	−3.7%
Turnout		3,289	33.7	+3.4%
Labour hold		Swing	+6.4%	
Labour hold		Swing	+7.3%	

=== Warbreck ===
Warbreck (2)
Party	Candidate	Votes	%	±%
Conservative	Joyce Delves	938	25.6%	−1.3%
Conservative	Tony Brown	911	24.9%	−1.3%
Labour	Steven Hemingway	621	17.0%	+5.8%
Labour	Doreen Peters	582	15.9%	+5.6%
Liberal Democrats	Kevan Benfold	185	5.1%	−3.8%
UKIP	Alex Ewan	185	5.1%	+5.1%
Liberal Democrats	Joleen Rixon	124	3.4%	−5.3%
Green	Philip Mitchell	112	3.1%	+3.1%
Turnout		3,658	37.4	−3.8%
Conservative hold		Swing	-3.6%	
Conservative hold		Swing	-3.5%	

=== Waterloo ===
Waterloo (2)
Party	Candidate	Votes	%	±%
Labour	David O'Hara	937	27.7%	+7.1%
Conservative	Tony Lee	793	23.5%	−3.9%
Conservative	Ian Fowler	728	21.5%	−5.0%
Labour	Tasurraf Shah	659	19.5%	+2.4%
Liberal Democrats	Alma Rollinson	263	7.8%	−0.6%
Turnout		3,380	34.6	−1.7%
Labour gain from Conservative		Swing	+5.5%	
Conservative hold		Swing	-3.7%	
