= Tildesley =

Tildesley is a surname, and may refer to:

- Beatrice Tildesley (1886–1977), Australian film and theatre critic
- Dominic Tildesley (born 1952), British chemist
- Donovan Tildesley (born 1984), blind Canadian swimmer
- Jim Tildesley (1881–1963), English footballer
- Mark Tildesley (production designer) (born 1963), British designer and director
- Miriam Tildesley (1883–1979), English anthropologist
- Murder of Mark Tildesley 1984 unsolved murder case

== See also ==
- Tyldesley, a town in Greater Manchester
- Tyldesley (disambiguation)
