= Tyldesley (disambiguation) =

Tyldesley is a town in Greater Manchester, England

Tyldesley may also refer to:

- Tyldesley (ward), an electoral ward of the Wigan Metropolitan Borough Council
- Tyldesley ward of the Borough of Blackpool
- Tyldesley (surname), an English family name
