= 2003 Blackpool Borough Council election =

2003 local election in England

← 2000	1 May 2003	2007 →
- All 42 seats up for election
Party	Leader	Vote %	Seats	+/–
Labour		42.65	25	0
Conservative		38.56	13	−2
Liberal Democrats		16.85	4	0
This lists parties that won seats. See the complete results below.

Map of the results of the 2003 Blackpool council election. Labour in red, Conservatives in blue and Liberal Democrats in yellow.

The 2003 Blackpool Borough Council election took place on 1 May 2003 to elect members of the Unitary Blackpool Borough Council in England. The Labour Party kept its overall majority and continued to run the council. Boundary changes had taken place since the last election in 2000 which reduced the number of seats by two. Overall turnout was 50.43%.

== Results summary ==
Blackpool local election result 2003
Party	Seats	Gains	Losses	Net gain/loss	Seats %	Votes %	Votes	+/−
Labour	25			0	59.52	42.65	42,624	
Conservative	13			-2	30.95	38.56	38,535	
Liberal Democrats	4			0	9.52	16.85	16,834	
Independent	0	0	0	0	0.00	1.74	1,739	
UKIP	0	0	0	0	0.00	0.20	200	

== Ward results ==
=== Anchorsholme ===
Anchorsholme (2)
Party	Candidate	Votes	%	±%
Liberal Democrats	Jonathon Bamborough	1,360	23.64	
Liberal Democrats	Steven Bate	1,196	20.79	
Conservative	Donald MacNaughton	886	15.40	
Conservative	Bryan Anandappa	852	14.81	
Labour	Alan Haynes	759	13.19	
Labour	Alice Lilley	700	12.17	
Turnout			54.1	

=== Bispham ===
Bispham (2)
Party	Candidate	Votes	%	±%
Conservative	Donald Clapham	1,553	31.05	
Conservative	Henry Mitchell	1,502	30.03	
Labour	John Boughton	805	16.10	
Labour	Christopher Ryan	739	14.78	
Liberal Democrats	Morry Hart	399	7.98	
Turnout			53.6	

=== Bloomfield ===
Bloomfield (2)
Party	Candidate	Votes	%	±%
Labour	Frances Smith	822	18.73	
Labour	Simon Blackburn	793	18.07	
Liberal Democrats	Doreen Holt	779	17.75	
Conservative	Barrie Hall	675	15.38	
Liberal Democrats	Kenneth Coleman	662	15.09	
Conservative	Michael Chappell	657	14.97	
Turnout			43.5	

=== Brunswick ===
Brunswick (2)
Party	Candidate	Votes	%	±%
Labour	Maureen Cresswell	1,233	30.77	
Labour	Barry Cresswell	1,214	30.30	
Conservative	Philip Cartwright	538	13.43	
Conservative	Brian Hartley Turnbull	502	12.53	
Liberal Democrats	Nicholas Grainger	320	7.99	
UKIP	Robert McDowell	200	4.99	
Turnout			41	

=== Claremont ===
Claremont (2)
Party	Candidate	Votes	%	±%
Labour	Ivan Taylor	1,245	28.82	
Labour	Sylvia Taylor	1,177	27.25	
Conservative	Linda Cole	744	17.22	
Conservative	Stephen Houghton	703	16.27	
Liberal Democrats	Lesley Owens	290	6.71	
Independent	John Porter	161	3.73	
Turnout			42	

=== Clifton ===
Clifton (2)
Party	Candidate	Votes	%	±%
Labour	Joan Greenhalgh	1,268	30.05	
Labour	Michael Carr	1,120	26.54	
Conservative	Christopher Perry	796	18.86	
Conservative	John McIntosh	680	16.11	
Liberal Democrats	Stuart Mackie	356	8.44	
Turnout			45.4	

=== Greenlands ===
Greenlands (2)
Party	Candidate	Votes	%	±%
Labour	Kathryn Benson	1,209	25.08	
Labour	Robert Harrison	1,146	23.78	
Conservative	Ian Dodd	1,012	21.00	
Conservative	Molly Laye	1,008	20.91	
Liberal Democrats	Barbara Bamborough	445	9.23	
Turnout			47.9	

=== Hawes Side ===
Hawes Side (2)
Party	Candidate	Votes	%	±%
Labour	Norman Hardy	1,352	28.74	
Labour	Valerie Haynes	1,274	27.08	
Conservative	Linda Richman	831	17.67	
Conservative	Graham Baker	815	17.33	
Liberal Democrats	Wendy Smalley	432	9.18	
Turnout			47.4	

=== Highfield ===
Highfield (2)
Party	Candidate	Votes	%	±%
Conservative	Lily Henderson	1,230	24.46	
Conservative	Susan Fowler	1,200	23.87	
Labour	Pamela Jackson	989	19.67	
Labour	Gary Coleman	936	18.62	
Liberal Democrats	Alan Watkins	673	13.39	
Turnout			52	

=== Ingthorpe ===
Ingthorpe (2)
Party	Candidate	Votes	%	±%
Labour	Kathleen Rowson	1,459	30.68	
Labour	Michael Bradley-Wilcox	1,251	26.30	
Conservative	Steven James	825	17.35	
Conservative	Kenneth Dyke	767	16.13	
Liberal Democrats	Carole Bate	454	9.55	
Turnout			49.1	

=== Layton ===
Layton (2)
Party	Candidate	Votes	%	±%
Labour	Susan Wright	1,423	29.47	
Labour	Roy Fisher	1,375	28.47	
Conservative	Stephen Flanigan	628	13.00	
Conservative	Marlene McGuirk	598	12.38	
Independent	Terence Woodings	482	9.98	
Liberal Democrats	Alma Rollinson	323	6.69	
Turnout			47.1	

=== Marton ===
Marton (2)
Party	Candidate	Votes	%	±%
Conservative	William Burgess	1,357	28.18	
Conservative	James Houldsworth	1,263	26.23	
Labour	James Elmes	1,010	20.98	
Labour	James Sorah	854	17.74	
Liberal Democrats	Hazel Williams	331	6.87	
Turnout			49.5	

=== Norbreck ===
Norbreck (2)
Party	Candidate	Votes	%	±%
Conservative	Peter Callow	1,835	32.80	
Conservative	Maxine Callow	1,804	32.25	
Labour	Roger Cooke	851	15.21	
Labour	Barbara Wright	726	12.98	
Liberal Democrats	Donna Bamborough	378	6.76	
Turnout			56.1	

=== Park ===
Park (2)
Party	Candidate	Votes	%	±%
Labour	Brian Doherty	1,071	27.31	
Labour	Leslie Kersh	1,055	26.91	
Conservative	Margaret Gough	573	14.61	
Conservative	Roger Jones	536	13.67	
Liberal Democrats	Tania Dundavon	411	10.48	
Independent	Thomas Johnston	275	7.01	
Turnout			43	

=== Squires Gate ===
Squires Gate (2)
Party	Candidate	Votes	%	±%
Liberal Democrats	Robert Wynne	1,413	27.11	
Liberal Democrats	Douglas Green	1,158	22.21	
Conservative	Geoffrey Price	793	15.21	
Conservative	Frank Harris	676	12.97	
Labour	Gillian Campbell	647	12.41	
Labour	Nicholas Gradwell	526	10.09	
Turnout			52.5	

=== Stanley ===
Stanley (2)
Party	Candidate	Votes	%	±%
Conservative	Peter Evans	1,215	23.61	
Conservative	Granville Heap	1,128	21.92	
Independent	John Finlay	821	15.95	
Labour	Carol Gradwell	747	14.52	
Liberal Democrats	Gaynor Wynne	665	12.92	
Labour	Beverley Harvey	570	11.08	
Turnout			53	

=== Talbot ===
Talbot (2)
Party	Candidate	Votes	%	±%
Labour	Philip Dunne	1,004	23.82	
Labour	Raymond Hutchinson	936	22.21	
Conservative	Patricia Mancini	699	16.58	
Conservative	Peter Watson	670	15.90	
Liberal Democrats	Alan Duxbury-Campbell	482	11.44	
Liberal Democrats	Mark Sponder	424	10.06	
Turnout			41.3	

=== Tyldesley ===
Tyldesley (2)
Party	Candidate	Votes	%	±%
Labour	Allan Matthews	1,387	29.34	
Labour	Edward Collett	1,294	27.37	
Conservative	Aubery Horne	872	18.44	
Conservative	Mohamed Hameed	740	15.65	
Liberal Democrats	Rodney Holt	435	9.20	
Turnout			48	

=== Victoria ===
Victoria (2)
Party	Candidate	Votes	%	±%
Labour	Frederick Jackson	1,100	24.16	
Labour	David Owen	998	21.92	
Liberal Democrats	Jacqueline Jackson	732	16.08	
Liberal Democrats	Peter Wood	652	14.32	
Conservative	Joan Horne	549	12.06	
Conservative	Jean Kenrick	522	11.46	
Turnout			46.7	

=== Warbreck ===
Warbreck (2)
Party	Candidate	Votes	%	±%
Conservative	Joyce Delves	1,210	24.38	
Conservative	David Brown	1,166	23.49	
Labour	Desmond Harvey	848	17.08	
Labour	Paul Waugh	813	16.38	
Liberal Democrats	Anne Heyworth	477	9.61	
Liberal Democrats	Kevan Benfold	450	9.07	
Turnout			47.9	

=== Waterloo ===
Waterloo (2)
Party	Candidate	Votes	%	±%
Conservative	Ian Fowler	1,027	20.72	
Labour	Carol Radcliffe	1,011	20.40	
Conservative	Ronald Bell	895	18.06	
Labour	Susan Rigby	887	17.89	
Liberal Democrats	Michael Hodkinson	592	11.94	
Liberal Democrats	Justin Allitt	545	10.99	
Turnout			47.9	
