= Mark Collett =

British neo-Nazi (born 1980)

Leader of Patriotic Alternative
- Incumbent
- Assumed office July 2019

Personal details
- Born: Mark Adrian Collett; October 1980 (age 45–46) Rothley, England
- Party: Patriotic Alternative (2019–present)
- Other political affiliations: British National Party (2002–2010)
- Education: Loughborough Grammar School
- Alma mater: University of Leeds
- Occupation: Political activist
- Known for: Former chairman of Youth BNP, founder and leader of Patriotic Alternative

Mark Adrian Collett (/ˈkɒlɪt/; born October 1980) is a British neo-Nazi political activist. He was the chairman of the Young BNP, the youth division of the British National Party (BNP), and was director of publicity for the party.

Collett first drew media attention after his appearance in a 2002 British TV documentary, where, in his role as a representative of the BNP, he made statements celebrating the death of Africans and homosexuals from HIV-AIDS, specifically referring to them as "AIDS monkeys". After the documentary was aired on Channel 4, resulting in negative publicity for the BNP, Collett was briefly expelled from the party. He later rejoined the BNP, until his membership was suspended in 2010, following an internal conflict with party leadership.

Since 2010, Collett has concentrated on his online political commentary, in which he promotes white supremacy, neo-Nazism, and conspiracy theories about Jews. In 2019, he founded a far-right, fascist and white nationalist hate group called Patriotic Alternative. In 2020, he was suspended from Twitter.

== Early life and education ==
From Rothley, Collett was educated at Loughborough Grammar School and the University of Leeds, where he received a lower second-class honours degree in business economics.

== Media appearances ==
=== Channel 4 documentary ===
Collett featured in a Channel 4 documentary on the BNP, Young, Nazi and Proud, broadcast in 2002 which concentrated almost exclusively on Collett. He declared his admiration for Adolf Hitler and said that he considered AIDS a "friendly disease because blacks, drug users and gays have it", unaware he was being recorded. Collett made similar remarks while on Russell Brand's 2002 TV show RE:Brand, in which he described homosexuals as "AIDS Monkeys", "bum bandits" and "faggots". Collett was sacked from his position in the party and expelled days after the Channel 4 documentary was broadcast, although party leaders continued to share speaking platforms with him. However he was allowed to rejoin a few days later with chairman Nick Griffin saying that he must change his views on the subject. Collett was the party's head of publicity and produced its monthly magazine, Identity.

=== BBC documentary and subsequent trial ===
As a result of a police investigation into another documentary, BBC One's The Secret Agent, which in July 2004 broadcast secret footage of Collett making derogatory remarks about asylum seekers, whom he called "cockroaches", Collett, then aged 24, was bailed on race hate offences at Leeds magistrates' court on 7 April 2005 alongside party founder John Tyndall and party leader Nick Griffin. The trial ended on 2 February 2006 after a jury acquitted Collett of two charges of using words or behaviour intended to stir up racial hatred, and two alternative charges of using words likely to stir up racial hatred. The jury failed to reach a verdict in respect of a further four charges.

The Crown Prosecution Service subsequently announced that Collett and Griffin would face a retrial on the remaining charges of using words or behaviour intended to stir up racial hatred. This retrial began at Leeds Crown Court on 1 November 2006 and he and Griffin were found not guilty.

=== Newsbeat interview ===
In October 2009, Collett and the BNP's record label executive Joseph Barber were interviewed on BBC Radio 1's Newsbeat bulletin, being introduced only as "Mark and Joey, two young guys who are members of the BNP". They said that the England international footballer Ashley Cole was not "ethnically British" due to having black heritage. An internal inquiry at the BBC criticised the interviewers for not identifying the pair by their full names and positions in the BNP, and for not sufficiently challenging their remarks about Cole.

== Political activities ==
=== BNP leadership bid ===
In April 2010, Collett was sacked from his job as BNP publicity chief and suspended from the party for being supportive of a leadership bid against Griffin, and was subsequently arrested by Humberside police, who questioned him over alleged threats to kill Griffin. Despite the reinstatement of Collett's party membership he did not stand for the party in the May 2010 general election. He had previously been selected as BNP candidate in Sheffield Brightside and Hillsborough, to challenge the then-Home Secretary David Blunkett.

Humberside Police did not bring charges against Collett over the allegations of threats to kill, formally dismissing them later in 2010.

=== Involvement in EU referendum campaign, 2016 ===
During the 2016 EU referendum campaign, Collett was seen campaigning for Vote Leave and was featured in news articles by daily newspapers, alongside his neo-Nazi partner Eva Van Housen. BBC News later reported that Vote Leave demanded Collett and Van Housen stop using their Brexit campaign materials.

=== Patriotic Alternative ===
In 2019, Collett formed a group called Patriotic Alternative, of which he is currently the leader. The Times revealed in October 2021 that Collett attended combat training with former members of the now-proscribed Neo-Nazi organisation National Action.

=== Calls to infiltrate Reform UK ===
In 2025, Collett called for supporters to "infiltrate" Reform UK following its recent success to push their own "pro-white" and anti-immigration agenda. Collett endorsed Reform in the 2024 general election.

=== Banned from Sweden ===
In July 2025, the government of Sweden decided to ban Collett from entering the country, and he was deported upon arriving at Stockholm Arlanda Airport.

== Political views ==
According to the Anti-Defamation League, Collett is a white supremacist with close ties to other white supremacists.

Collett has expressed admiration for Russian president Vladimir Putin, believing him to be a bulwark against Western "feminism, the LGBT agenda, attacks on the traditional family and of course, anti-white rhetoric". He defended the Russian invasion of Ukraine and blamed it on NATO.

== Elections contested ==
=== General elections ===
Date of election	Constituency	Party	Votes	%
2005	Leeds Central	BNP	1,201	4.1

=== Local elections ===
Date of election	Council	Ward	Party	Votes	%
2002	Leeds City Council	Harehills	BNP	209	3.8
2004	Leeds City Council	Burmantofts & Richmond Hill	BNP	949	15.8
2006	Leeds City Council	Burmantofts & Richmond Hill	BNP	1,124	21.8
2007	Leeds City Council	Burmantofts & Richmond Hill	BNP	898	18.5
2008	Leeds City Council	Burmantofts & Richmond Hill	BNP	919	20.7

== See also ==
- Jack Renshaw (neo-Nazi)
