= BNP Youth =

Youth section of the British National Party

- Shield Logo of the YBNP
- Predecessor: Young British National Party
- Purpose: Youth wing
- Resistance leader: Unknown
- Parent organization: British National Party

BNP Youth (formerly Young BNP, BNP Crusaders, Resistance, Youth BNP, BNP Youth and YBNP) is the youth section of the far-right British National Party (BNP).

== History ==
In 2002, the Young BNP chairman Mark Collett chose the Odal SS-rune as the logo for his organisation, then described as the "Young BNP", which Channel 4's Young, Nazi and Proud stated was used by the Nazis and sections of the Schutzstaffel (SS). In 2010, it was renamed "BNP Crusaders" and aimed at the slightly older demographic of 18–30 years of age.

In 2011, it changed its name to Resistance. The group falls under the arm of the British Nationalist Youth Movement with other groups such as BNP Students. The YBNP claimed to be a civil rights movement and student pressure group for white British students.

== Student BNP ==
Student BNP was part of the British Nationalist Youth Movement along with YBNP. In 2010, Student BNP closed down and BNP Crusaders was formed as a replacement.

== Leadership ==
- Until 2002: Mark Collett
- 2003–2004: Tony Wentworth
- 2004–2005: Jenny Griffin
- 2006–2007: Danny Lake
- 2008–2010: Mike Howson
- 2010–2011: Kieren Trent
- 2011–2014: Kevin Layzell
- 2014–2015: Jack Andrew Renshaw
