= 2019 Blackpool Council election =

2019 local election in Blackpool

- 2 May 2019

All 42 seats to Blackpool Council 22 seats needed for a majority

	First party	Second party	Third party
Leader	Simon Blackburn	Tony Williams	Debbie Coleman
Party	Labour	Conservative	Independent
Last election	29 seats, 43.6%	13 seats, 39.1%	0 seats, 0.3%
Seats won	23	15	4
Seat change	▼6	▲2	▲4
Popular vote	23,940	24,241	3,785
Percentage	43.9%	44.4%	6.9%
Swing	▲0.3%	▲5.3%	▲6.6%
- Winner of each seat at the 2019 Blackpool Council election
Council control before election
Labour
Council control after election
Labour

The 2019 Blackpool Council election took place on 2 May 2019 to elect members of Blackpool Council in England.

Blackpool Council had been controlled by the Labour Party since 2011, which held a majority of ten with 26 councillors. The Conservatives were defending twelve seats, and independent councillors were defending four.

== Background ==
Blackpool Council held local elections on 2 May 2019 along with councils across England and Northern Ireland as part of the 2019 local elections. The council elects its members in all-out elections, with all its councillors up for election every four years. Councillors defending their seats in this election were previously elected in 2015. In that election, 29 Labour councillors and 13 Conservative councillors were elected.

The Conservative Party held its seat in Warbreck ward following a March 2017 by-election.

Following suspension by the Conservative Party, Colin Maycock left his party to sit as an independent councillor in November 2017.

Following complaints about comments he made at an event in March 2018, Ian Coleman resigned as mayor, left the Labour group on the council, and said he wouldn't stand for re-election. His son and daughter-in-law, Labour councillors Gary Coleman and Debbie Coleman, left their party in June 2018 to sit as independents. Debbie Coleman had been deselected, and Gary Coleman had announced he wouldn't seek re-election. The three councillors formed a new group called the Independent Blackpool Residents Group.

Two Conservative councillors including former council leader Peter Callow were deselected by their party.

== Summary ==
=== Election result ===
2019 Blackpool Council election
Party	Candidates	Seats	Gains	Losses	Net gain/loss	Seats %	Votes %	Votes	+/−
Labour	42	23	0	6	▼6	54.8	43.9	23,940	+0.3
Conservative	42	15	4	2	▲2	35.7	44.4	24,241	+5.3
Independent	8	4	4	0	▲4	9.5	6.9	3,785	+6.6
Green	7	0	0	0	Steady	0.0	2.6	1,440	+1.1
Liberal Democrats	6	0	0	0	Steady	0.0	2.1	1,147	+0.5

=== Council composition ===
After the previous election, the composition of the council was:

↓
29	13
Labour	Conservative

Immediately ahead of this election, the composition of the council was:

↓
26	4	12
Labour	Independent	Conservative

Following the election, the composition of the council was:

↓
23	4	15
Labour	Independent	Conservative

== Ward results ==
Incumbent councillors seeking re-election are marked with an asterisk (*). Two sitting councillors—Debbie Coleman and Andrew Stansfield—sought election in different wards.

=== Anchorsholme ===
Anchorsholme (2 Seats)
Party	Candidate	Votes	%	±%
Conservative	Paul Galley*	1,278	65.9	
Conservative	Tony Williams*	1,225	63.2	
Labour	Jon Bamborough	530	27.3	
Labour	Kendrick Fowler	376	19.4	
Liberal Democrats	Alexander Bettison	175	9.0	
Majority				
Turnout		1,938	38.2%	

=== Bispham ===
Bispham (2 Seats)
Party	Candidate	Votes	%	±%
Conservative	Don Clapham*	868	50.6	
Conservative	Paul Wilshaw	778	45.4	
Labour	Robert Dewick	518	30.2	
Labour	Ian Treasure	493	28.7	
Independent	Steven Bate	440	25.7	
Majority				
Turnout		1,715	35.1%	

=== Bloomfield ===
Bloomfield (2 seats)
Party	Candidate	Votes	%	±%
Labour	Graham Cain*	646	65.7	
Labour	Jim Hobson*	604	61.4	
Conservative	Karen Staff	291	29.6	
Conservative	Roger Jones	257	26.1	
Majority				
Turnout		984	21.5%	

=== Brunswick ===
Brunswick (2 seats)
Party	Candidate	Votes	%	±%
Labour	Simon Blackburn*	476	38.8	
Independent	Gary Coleman*	453	36.9	
Labour	Portia Owen	440	35.9	
Independent	Andy Higgins	387	31.5	
Conservative	Shirley Cantrell	216	17.6	
Conservative	Mandy Cunliffe	200	16.3	
Green	Maureen Beck	128	10.4	
Majority				
Turnout		1,227	27.9%	

=== Claremont ===
Claremont (2 seats)
Party	Candidate	Votes	%	±%
Labour	Ivan Taylor*	667	58.2	
Labour	Lynn Williams*	619	54.0	
Conservative	Lucy Green	279	24.3	
Conservative	Michaela Jackson	227	19.8	
Green	Garry Richardson	189	16.5	
Liberal Democrats	Sue Close	156	13.6	
Majority				
Turnout		1,147	23.8%	

=== Clifton ===
Clifton (2 seats)
Party	Candidate	Votes	%	±%
Labour	Paula Burdess	644	51.4	
Labour	Adrian Hutton*	653	52.1	
Conservative	Robert Ronson	492	39.2	
Conservative	Moira Graham	480	38.3	
Majority				
Turnout		1,254	25.7%	

=== Greenlands ===
Greenlands (2 seats)
Party	Candidate	Votes	%	±%
Conservative	Rick Scott	757	49.6	
Conservative	Bernard Wing	718	47.1	
Labour	Chris Ryan*	702	46.0	
Labour	Christine Wright*	675	44.3	
Majority				
Turnout		1,525	30.3	

=== Hawes Side ===
Hawes Side (2 seats)
Party	Candidate	Votes	%	±%
Labour	Kim Critchley*	606	45.2	
Labour	Neil Brookes	604	45.1	
Conservative	Glenn Priestley	496	37.0	
Conservative	Lesley Wright	467	34.9	
Green	Dean Eden	246	18.4	
Majority				
Turnout		1,340	27.0	

=== Highfield ===
Highfield (2 seats)
Party	Candidate	Votes	%	±%
Labour	Peter Hunter*	793	50.3	
Conservative	Lily Henderson*	760	48.2	
Conservative	Gary Pennington	713	45.2	
Labour	Nicola Ryan	628	39.8	
Majority				
Turnout		1,577	31.7	

=== Ingthorpe ===
Ingthorpe (2 seats)
Party	Candidate	Votes	%	±%
Labour	Amy Cross*	901	54.1	
Labour	Jo Farrell	828	49.7	
Conservative	Peter Allen-Rogers	715	42.9	
Conservative	Mick Curwen	647	38.9	
Majority				
Turnout		1,665	32.5	

=== Layton ===
Layton (2 seats)
Party	Candidate	Votes	%	±%
Labour	Kath Benson*	776	54.5	
Labour	Martin Mitchell*	664	46.6	
Conservative	Mark Courtney-Massey	483	33.9	
Conservative	Thelma Stables	482	33.8	
Liberal Democrats	Lee Taylor-Jack	172	12.1	
Majority				
Turnout		1,425	29.3	

=== Marton ===
Marton (2 seats)
Party	Candidate	Votes	%	±%
Conservative	Andrew Stansfield	584	38.0	
Independent	Debbie Coleman	544	35.4	
Labour	Jim Elmes*	543	35.3	
Labour	Judith Costello	507	33.0	
Conservative	Jack Robinson	476	30.9	
Majority				
Turnout		1,538	30.4	

=== Norbreck ===
Norbreck (2 seats)
Party	Candidate	Votes	%	±%
Norbreck Independents	Maxine Callow*	742	39.2	
Norbreck Independents	Peter Callow*	717	37.9	
Conservative	Anne-Marie Clarke	614	32.5	
Conservative	Roy Haskett	585	30.9	
Labour	Laura White	379	20.0	
Labour	James Sorah	350	18.5	
Liberal Democrats	Simon Jowitt	200	10.6	
Majority				
Turnout		1,892	37.7	

=== Park ===
Park (2 seats)
Party	Candidate	Votes	%	±%
Labour	Gillian Campbell*	694	55.7	
Labour	Maria Kirkland*	653	52.4	
Conservative	Paul Carter	489	39.3	
Conservative	Antony Manning	421	33.8	
Majority				
Turnout		1,245	24.4	

=== Squires Gate ===
Squires Gate (2 seats)
Party	Candidate	Votes	%	±%
Conservative	Christian Cox*	817	56.8	
Conservative	Gerard Walsh	669	46.5	
Labour	Alistair Humphreys*	477	33.1	
Labour	Sharon Doyle	443	30.8	
Green	Julie Daniels	222	15.4	
Majority				
Turnout		1,439	30.3	

=== Stanley ===
Stanley (2 seats)
Party	Candidate	Votes	%	±%
Conservative	Graham Baker	1,019	61.1	
Conservative	Jason Roberts*	973	58.3	
Labour	Shaun Brookes	447	26.8	
Labour	Carl Webb	396	23.7	
Liberal Democrats	Bill Greene	201	12.0	
Majority				
Turnout		1,669	31.0	

=== Talbot ===
Talbot (2 seats)
Party	Candidate	Votes	%	±%
Labour	Mark Smith*	569	45.3	
Labour	Jane Hugo	561	44.7	
Conservative	Charlie Docherty	490	39.0	
Conservative	Callum Catterall	463	36.9	
Green	Alistair Blair	215	17.1	
Majority				
Turnout		1,256	27.7	

=== Tyldesley ===
Tyldesley (2 seats)
Party	Candidate	Votes	%	±%
Labour	Allan Matthews*	608	48.5	
Labour	David Collett*	602	48.0	
Conservative	Samantha Bell	410	32.7	
Conservative	Aishley Docherty	369	29.4	
Green	Gina Eastwood	256	20.4	
Majority				
Turnout		1,253	26.2	

=== Victoria ===
Victoria (2 seats)
Party	Candidate	Votes	%	±%
Labour	Fred Jackson*	627	60.9	
Labour	David Owen*	559	54.3	
Conservative	Monique Mannion	353	34.3	
Conservative	Sue Ridyard	324	31.5	
Majority				
Turnout		1,030	22.5	

=== Warbreck ===
Warbreck (2 seats)
Party	Candidate	Votes	%	±%
Conservative	Danny Scott*	708	53.5	
Conservative	Michelle Scott*	688	52.0	
Labour	Jake Adams	406	30.7	
Labour	Desmond Harvey	376	28.4	
Liberal Democrats	Kevan Benfold	243	18.4	
Majority				
Turnout		1,323	26.6	

=== Waterloo ===
Waterloo (2 seats)
Party	Candidate	Votes	%	±%
Conservative	Derek Robertson*	506	37.2	
Labour	David O'Hara*	457	33.6	
Conservative	Susan Whadcock	454	33.3	
Labour	Heather O'Hara	443	32.5	
Independent	David Shackleton	279	20.5	
Independent	Spencer Shackleton	223	16.4	
Green	Becky Daniels	184	13.5	
Majority				
Turnout		1,362	28.0	

== Changes 2019-2023 ==
=== By-elections ===
==== Highfield ====
Highfield by-election, 6 May 2021
Party	Candidate	Votes	%	±%
Conservative	Bradley Curtis Mitchell	982	54.9	+4.0
Labour	Christine Elizabeth Wright	498	27.8	−21.3
Independent	Rob Wynne	192	10.7	N/A
Green	Becky Daniels	55	3.1	N/A
Reform	Kim Sherrie Knight	40	2.2	N/A
Liberal Democrats	Bill Greene	22	1.2	N/A
Majority		484	27.1	
Turnout		1790	37.2	+5.6
Registered electors		4,811		
Conservative hold		Swing		

The Highfield by-election was triggered by the death of Conservative councillor Lily Henderson.

==== Norbreck ====
Norbreck by-election, 6 May 2021
Party	Candidate	Votes	%	±%
Conservative	Julie Elizabeth Sloman	963	50.6	+18.9
Independent	Pam Haslam	480	25.2	−13.3
Labour	Julie Elizabeth Jones	378	19.9	+0.6
Liberal Democrats	Simon Keith Jowitt	82	4.3	−6.3
Majority		483	25.4	
Turnout		1911	39.0	+1.3
Registered electors		4,901		
Conservative gain from Independent		Swing		

The Norbreck by-election was triggered by the death of independent councillor and former council leader Peter Callow.

==== Greenlands ====
Greenlands by-election, 17 November 2022
Party	Candidate	Votes	%	±%
Labour	Peter Wright	550	48.0	−0.2
Conservative	Jane Elizabeth Ann Warne	518	45.2	−6.5
Liberal Democrats	Kev Benfold	77	6.7	N/A
Majority		32	2.8	
Turnout		1148	23.1	−7.2
Registered electors		4,981		
Labour gain from Conservative		Swing		

The Greenlands by-election was triggered by the death of Conservative councillor John Wing.
