= Jack Renshaw (neo-Nazi) =

British far-right activist and convicted child sex offender

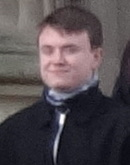
- Jack Renshaw in 2016
- Born: Jack Andrew Renshaw; 1995 (age 30–31); Ormskirk, Lancashire, England, United Kingdom
- Status: Incarcerated at HM Prison Wakefield
- Convictions: a) Stirring up racial hatred (January 2018) b) Inciting a child to engage in sexual activity (June 2018) c) Preparing an act of terrorism and threatening to kill a police officer (June 2018)
- Penalty: a) 3 years b) 18 months c) Life imprisonment with a minimum term of 20 years

Jack Andrew Renshaw (born 1995) is a British former spokesperson for the neo-Nazi organisation National Action, convicted child sex offender, and the planner of an attempted murder of a Member of Parliament. Before becoming a spokesperson for National Action, he was an economics and politics student at Manchester Metropolitan University and an organiser for the BNP Youth – the youth wing of the British National Party (BNP), a far-right, fascist political party.

His child sexual offences involved contacting 13- to 15-year-old boys in 2016 and 2017, sending graphic photographs of himself, and offering them gifts, money, and drugs to send him intimate photos and to have sex with him, resulting in a conviction of four counts of inciting a child to engage in sexual activity.

On 12 June 2018, Renshaw pleaded guilty to preparing an act of terrorism, with the intention of killing the Labour MP Rosie Cooper, and to making a threat to murder a police officer.

== Early life ==
Renshaw was born in Ormskirk in 1995 and raised in Skelmersdale. As a child, Renshaw moved to Blackpool and later became involved with the English Defence League (EDL). Renshaw became disillusioned with the EDL as he thought they were too pro-LGBT and pro-Jewish. Renshaw joined the BNP at the age of 15, against his parents' wishes.

While an economic and politics student at the Manchester Metropolitan University (MMU) in September 2013, Renshaw became the face of BNP Youth. In an interview with the student newspaper The Tab, he claimed to have "had ethnic minority flatmates and some homosexuals" during his stay at university. Four years after joining BNP Youth, Renshaw decided to go canvassing. He was eventually forced to leave MMU in September 2015 following a university investigation regarding his incitement to racial hatred.

Renshaw wishes to bring back National service and has previously said that he wanted to join the British Army when he left university. He has an uncompromising attitude towards the war on drugs, saying that "drug dealers should be hung from the nearest lamppost ... [lethal injection execution] would cost too much money for the taxpayer". Renshaw's application for the BNP to gain Student Union recognition was rejected by the union.

== BNP Youth organiser ==
As an organiser in BNP Youth, the youth wing of the British National Party, Renshaw appeared in a much-derided 2014 video titled "BNP Youth Fight Back" which railed against "cultural Marxism", "militant homosexuals", "heartless Zionists", "political correctness", Islam, immigration, multiculturalism, Doreen Lawrence and other perceived societal ills and a perceived eradication of British identity. The video has since been removed by YouTube for violating its policy on hate speech. Writing for the Left Foot Forward, Mark Gardner noted, "At times the language and targets, 'Zionists', 'neo-Cons', 'capitalists', 'globalisation', resemble the modern extremes of far-Left, Islamist and (especially) New Age ideology. There is, however, nothing modern about BNP antisemitism, not even when they swap the word 'Zionist' for the word 'Jew' ... It is a very serious antisemitism that blames Jews for nothing less than the destruction of European nations. This is not neo-Nazism, it is old original Nazism, echoing Mein Kampf and Der Steurmer [sic]. In public broadcasts the party still targets Muslims for ugly racism, but within its own circles the deeper antisemitic ideology is resurrected."

In another BNP TV video, Spreading Truth to Youth, Jack Renshaw spoke out against "banksters" such as the Rothschild family and claimed that allegations of the BNP's racism and fascism are "Talmudic". In another such video, Nationalism not Globalism, Renshaw claims that the European Union is part of a preliminary "global New World Order" in order for the Rothschilds to allegedly bind the globe via trillions of pounds of debt. He also blames "capitalists", "financial institutions" and "cultural Marxists" for "trying to mongrelise the races of the planet".

A few months later, opposed to his dog's perceived homosexuality, Renshaw wrote on Facebook telling his pet Labrador Derek to not "challenge my principles" by "licking the penises of other male dogs". He has since stated that "the status about my dog was a joke. I have learnt my lesson, that's all I can say".

Renshaw stood as a candidate for the BNP in Blackpool Council's Waterloo by-election on 9 October 2014; he received just 17 votes.

== Spokesperson for National Action ==
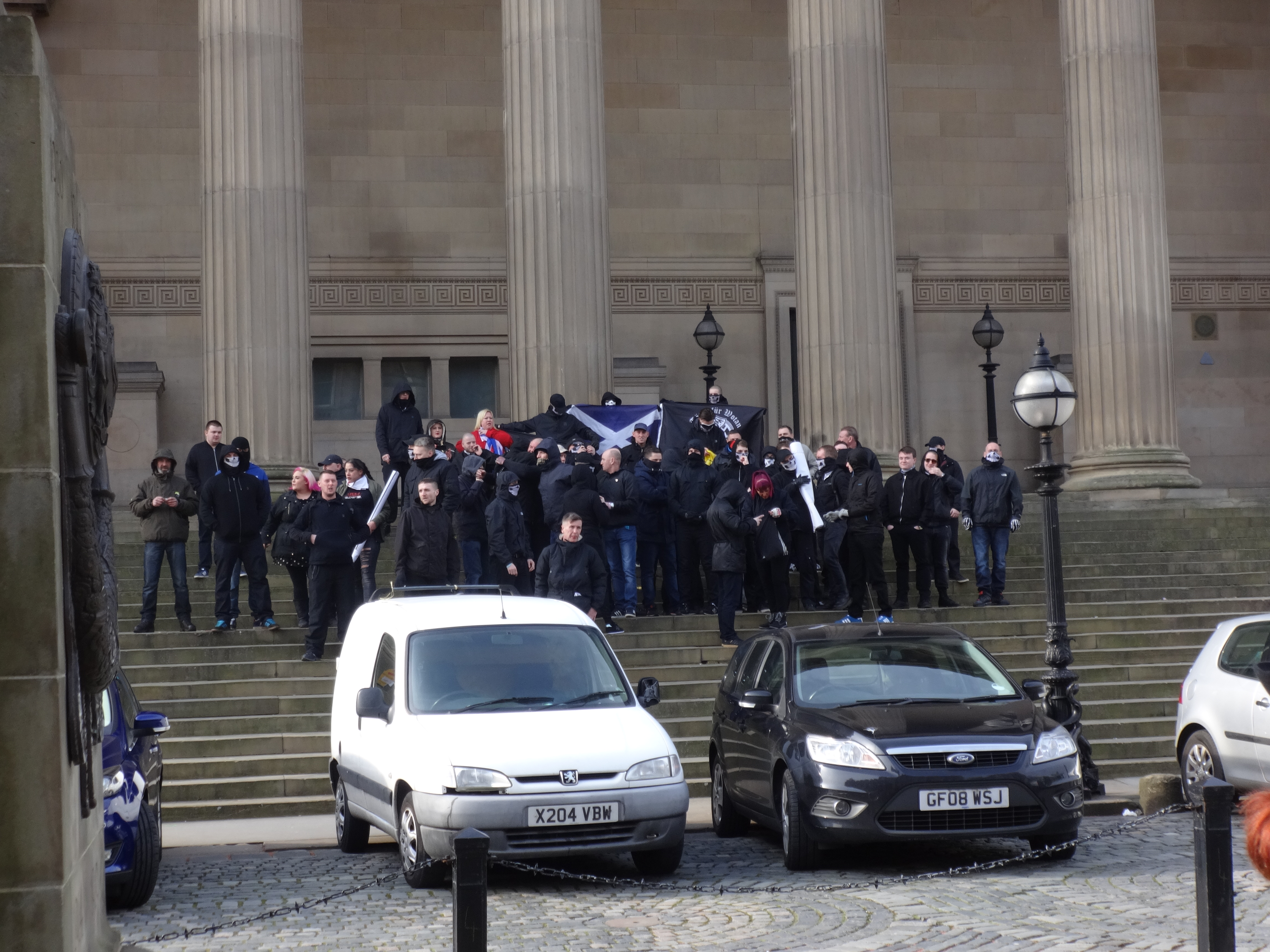
February 2016 protest in front of St George's Hall, Liverpool, by the North West Infidels. Renshaw is fourth from the right.

During a Yorkshire Forum event in 2015, Renshaw called for Jews to be "eradicated". As the spokesman for National Action, a far-right organisation within the United Kingdom, Renshaw said that he was sympathetic to Adolf Hitler, saying that Hitler's only fault was to show mercy to Jews. Renshaw faced a criminal investigation by the West Yorkshire Police over his "potential antisemitic comments".

Additionally, the Crown Prosecution Service (CPS) was considering whether to charge Renshaw with inciting racial hatred over comments made at a protest in Blackpool in March 2016, organised by the neo-Nazi North West Infidels. In front of police officers and surrounded by a group of masked men, Renshaw described Jews as "parasites", claimed that white people were "a superior race" and stated that the UK took the "wrong side" in the Second World War by fighting the Nazis "who were there to remove Jewry from Europe once and for all". That month, the Liverpool Echo reported that Renshaw was thought to have been part of a group of North West Infidels and National Action protestors in a rally in Liverpool.

Dave Rich, of the Community Security Trust, said, "Anybody who is inciting hatred and violence of that kind needs to be dealt with fully by the law." Nick Lowles of Hope Not Hate criticised perceived double standards in the justice system, saying that were such words to be uttered by an Islamist extremist, they would have been arrested. The CPS at that point had taken no action over Renshaw's comments.

National Action was proscribed as a terrorist organisation following its conduct after the murder of Jo Cox and its support for her murderer Thomas Mair.

In November 2016, Renshaw was facing criminal charges over incitement to racial hatred.

In July 2017, he was charged by the CPS, under pressure from the Campaign Against Antisemitism. In early 2018, Renshaw was convicted of two counts of stirring up racial hatred.

=== Golders Green march ===
In May 2015, the far-right blogger Joshua Bonehill-Paine planned a protest against the "Jewification of Britain [... and the] occupation force of approximately 50,000 Jews" in Golders Green, the heartland of London's Jewish community. Renshaw pulled out from speaking because he was supposed to be at work, one of the other booked speakers was Jewish, and because he disapproved of organiser Eddie Stampton.

== Plan to murder Rosie Cooper ==
On 12 June 2018, Renshaw and five others were tried for alleged membership of National Action, a proscribed neo-Nazi terrorist group. All denied this; however, Renshaw pleaded guilty to preparing an act of terrorism, namely the purchase of a machete, with a plan to kill the Labour Member of Parliament for West Lancashire, Rosie Cooper, and threatening to kill a police officer who had been investigating him concerning child sex offences. His co-accused, Christopher Lythgoe and Matthew Hankinson, were convicted of remaining members of National Action after it was proscribed by the Home Secretary, Amber Rudd, but jurors were unable to decide whether Renshaw had remained a member after the group was banned. During the trial, it was alleged that Renshaw had rejected the suggestion from Lythgoe that he should instead kill Rudd, arguing that she would be too well protected. It was also claimed that Renshaw had dismissed Lythgoe's idea that he "do it in the name of National Action", saying that he would commit the act "in the name of white jihad".

Renshaw was convicted at the Old Bailey on charges of engaging in conduct in preparation of a terrorist act (contrary to section 5 of the Terrorism Act 2006) and making a threat to kill (contrary to section 16 of the Offences Against the Person Act 1861). On 17 May 2019, the judge sentenced Renshaw to life imprisonment, with a minimum term of 20 years, for the plan to kill Cooper and the police officer who was investigating him for child sex offences. Mrs Justice McGowan said that Renshaw's "perverted view of history and current politics" led him to "an attempt to damage our entire system of democracy". She said, "You praised the murder of Jo Cox in tweets and posts in June 2017. In some bizarre way you saw this as a commendable act and set out to replicate that criminal behaviour." She added that Renshaw had made "detailed arrangements" to assassinate the MP. These included buying a 19in (48 cm) Gladius knife, studying Cooper's itinerary and telling members of National Action about his plan during a meeting in a Warrington pub in July 2017. The plot was foiled by a whistleblower and former National Action member Robbie Mullen, who was secretly passing information to the anti-racism charity Hope not Hate, which informed the police.

== Child sexual offences ==
On 2 April 2019, at his trial for membership of National Action, when the jury were unable to reach a verdict, it emerged that Renshaw had been convicted of child sexual offences in 2018 and sentenced to 16 months in prison. Renshaw had set up two fake Facebook profiles and contacted boys, aged 13 and 14, between February 2016 and January 2017. Communicating via Facebook Messenger, he boasted that he was rich, could give them jobs and offered one of them £300 to spend the night with him. He also requested intimate photographs of the pair, before one of them reported the messages and the police were contacted. Renshaw admitted to the police that he had searched for gay pornography on the Internet, although he was often openly homophobic and told police he thought homosexuality was "unnatural".

In his unsuccessful defence, Renshaw claimed, without providing any evidence, that all four of his phones were hacked by the anti-fascist charity Hope not Hate; technical experts for the prosecution agreed that the alleged hacking was impossible. He was found guilty of four counts of inciting a child to engage in sexual activity.

== In popular culture ==
Renshaw was played by Dean-Charles Chapman in the 2022 TV series The Walk-In concerning the plot to assassinate Cooper.

== See also ==
- Mark Collett
