= Jim Tildesley =

English footballer

Personal information
- Full name: James Tildesley
- Date of birth: 7 October 1881
- Place of birth: Halesowen, England
- Date of death: January 1963 (aged 81)
- Place of death: Newcastle upon Tyne, England
- Position: Right back

Senior career*
Years	Team	Apps	(Gls)
- Halesowen St John
1903–1906	Newcastle United	21	(0)
1906–1909	Middlesbrough	23	(0)
- Luton Town
1909–1910	Leeds City	6	(0)
- * Club domestic league appearances and goals

James Tildesley (7 October 1881 – January 1963) was an English professional footballer who played as a right back in the Football League for Middlesbrough, Newcastle United and Leeds City.

== Personal life ==
Tildesley served as a private in the Army Service Corps during the First World War.

== Career statistics ==
Appearances and goals by club, season and competition
Club	Season	League			FA Cup		Total	
Club	Season	Division	Apps	Goals	Apps	Goals	Apps	Goals
Newcastle United	1903–04	First Division	16	0	1	0	17	0
Newcastle United	1905–06	First Division	5	0	0	0	5	0
Newcastle United	Total		21	0	1	0	22	0
Middlesbrough	1906–07	First Division	23	0	2	0	25	0
Leeds City	1909–10	Second Division	6	0	1	0	7	0
Career total			50	0	4	0	54	0
