= James Tyldesley =

English cricketer

James Darbyshire Tyldesley (10 August 1889 – 31 March 1923) was an English cricketer active from 1910 to 1922 who played for Lancashire. He was born in Ashton-in-Makerfield and died in Bolton. He appeared in 116 first-class matches as a righthanded batsman who bowled right arm fast. He scored 2,885 runs with a highest score of 112*, one of three centuries, and held 97 catches. He took 309 wickets, including five wickets in an innings 15 times, with a best analysis of seven for 34. James Tyldesley was the second of four cricketing brothers who all played for Lancashire: William, himself, Harry and Dick.
