= Harry Tyldesley =

English cricketer

Harry Tyldesley (30 May 1893 – 30 August 1935) was an English cricketer active from 1914 to 1922 who played for Lancashire.

He was born in Ashton-in-Makerfield and died in Morecambe. He appeared in nine first-class matches as a righthanded batsman who bowled right arm slow pace. He scored 102 runs with a highest score of 33* and held seven catches. He took 18 wickets with a best analysis of five for 100. Harry Tyldesley was the third of four cricketing brothers who all played for Lancashire: William, James, Richard and himself.
