= William Tyldesley =

English cricketer

Personal information
- Born: William Knowles Tyldesley; 12 August 1887 Wigan, England
- Died: 26 April 1918 (aged 30) Kemmelberg, Belgium
- Years active: 1908–1914
- Relatives: Dick Tyldesley (brother); Harry Tyldesley (brother); James Tyldesley (brother)

Sport
- Country: England
- Sport: Cricket
- Team: Lancashire County

William Knowles Tyldesley (12 August 1887 – 26 April 1918) was an English cricketer active from 1908 to 1914 who played for Lancashire. He was born in Wigan and died in Kemmel, Belgium, while serving with the British Army in World War I. He appeared in 87 first-class matches as a lefthanded batsman who bowled left arm medium-fast pace. He scored 2,979 runs with a highest score of 152, one of three centuries, and held 52 catches. He took eight wickets with a best analysis of two for zero.

William Tyldesley was the eldest of four cricketing brothers who all played for Lancashire: himself, James, Harry and Dick. He became a lieutenant in the Loyal Regiment.

He was killed in action and is buried at La Clytte Military Cemetery.
