= 1958 Blackpool Borough Council election =

Local election in Blackpool, England

- 8 May 1958

14 of 56 seats to Blackpool County Borough Council 29 seats needed for a majority
	First party	Second party	Third party
Party	Liberal	Conservative	Labour
Seats before	24	26	6
Seats won	7	7	0
Seats after	26	24	6
Seat change	▲2	▼2	Steady
Popular vote	15,848	19,440	11,008
Percentage	34.2%	42.0%	23.8%
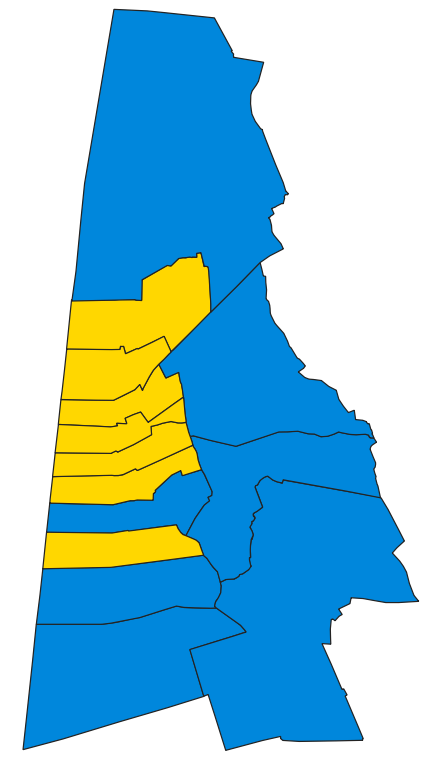
- Map of results of 1958 election
Leader of the Council before election
No overall control
Leader of the Council after election
No overall control

Elections to Blackpool Borough Council were held on Thursday, 8 May 1958. One third of the councillors seats were up for election, with each successful candidate to serve a three-year term of office. The council remained under no overall control.

== Election result ==
Party	Votes	Seats			Full Council	
Liberal Party	15,848 (34.2%)	7 (50.0%)	7 / 14	▲2	26 (46.4%)	26 / 56
Conservative Party	19,440 (42.0%)	7 (50.0%)	7 / 14	▼2	24 (42.9%)	24 / 56
Labour Party	11,008 (23.8%)	0 (0.0%)	0 / 14	Steady	6 (10.7%)	6 / 56

=== Full council ===
↓
6	26	24

== Ward results ==
=== Alexandra ===
Alexandra
Party	Candidate	Votes	%	±%
Liberal	N. B. Lole	1,068	41.2	
Conservative	M. Samuels	948	36.6	
Labour	P. Ladkin	577	22.2	
Majority		120	4.6	
Turnout		2,593	49.8	
Liberal hold		Swing		

=== Bank Hey ===
Bank Hey
Party	Candidate	Votes	%	±%
Liberal	L. F. Sharpe	564	74.5	
Labour	E. Edwards	193	25.5	
Majority		371	49.0	
Turnout		757	32.1	
Liberal hold		Swing		

=== Bispham ===
Bispham
Party	Candidate	Votes	%	±%
Conservative	J. H. Smythe*	3,838	53.5	
Liberal	H. Taylor	2,224	31.0	
Labour	E. T. Sides	1,109	15.5	
Majority		1,614	22.5	
Turnout		7,171	39.2	
Conservative hold		Swing		

=== Brunswick ===
Brunswick
Party	Candidate	Votes	%	±%
Liberal	J. P. Rodger	917	50.0	
Conservative	L. Davis	702	38.2	
Labour	L. Pattinson	216	11.8	
Majority		215	11.8	
Turnout		1,835	43.7	
Liberal gain from Conservative		Swing		

=== Claremont ===
Claremont
Party	Candidate	Votes	%	±%
Liberal	W. Briggs	849	47.7	
Conservative	R. A. Fast	617	34.7	
Labour	M. Allitt	314	17.6	
Majority		232	13.0	
Turnout		1,780	45.0	
Liberal hold		Swing		

=== Foxhall ===
Foxhall
Party	Candidate	Votes	%	±%
Liberal	C. Cross*	1,349	72.6	
Labour	M. Mason	509	27.4	
Majority		840	45.2	
Turnout		1,858	35.7	
Liberal hold		Swing		

=== Layton ===
Layton
Party	Candidate	Votes	%	±%
Conservative	R. Jacobs	2,205	41.2	
Liberal	J. A. Kenworthy*	1,971	36.8	
Labour	J. Riley	1,181	22.0	
Majority		234	4.4	
Turnout		5,357	36.7	
Conservative gain from Liberal		Swing		

=== Marton ===
Marton
Party	Candidate	Votes	%	±%
Conservative	J. S. Leigh	1,963	50.3	
Labour	J. V. Brown	1,022	26.2	
Liberal	W. Turner	916	23.5	
Majority		941	24.1	
Turnout		3,901	44.9	
Conservative hold		Swing		

=== Stanley ===
Stanley
Party	Candidate	Votes	%	±%
Conservative	A. Ashworth*	2,829	50.3	
Labour	M. Riley	2,800	49.7	
Majority		29	0.6	
Turnout		5,629	42.0	
Conservative hold		Swing		

=== Talbot ===
Talbot
Party	Candidate	Votes	%	±%
Liberal	E. W. Seaman	905	57.1	
Labour	S. H. Millward	680	42.9	
Majority		225	14.2	
Turnout		1,585	40.0	
Liberal gain from Conservative		Swing		

=== Tyldesley ===
Tyldesley
Party	Candidate	Votes	%	±%
Conservative	L. Pilkington*	1,096	38.2	
Liberal	A. E. Harris	954	33.3	
Labour	E. Watkin	816	28.5	
Majority		142	4.9	
Turnout		2,866	48.1	
Conservative hold		Swing		

=== Victoria ===
Victoria
Party	Candidate	Votes	%	±%
Conservative	R. Wall*	1,337	43.4	
Labour	G. S. Benson	910	29.5	
Liberal	G. H. H. Towse	835	27.1	
Majority		427	13.9	
Turnout		3,082	41.3	
Conservative hold		Swing		

=== Warbreck ===
Warbreck
Party	Candidate	Votes	%	±%
Liberal	S. Rock	1,260	50.8	
Conservative	W. C. Halton*	1,196	49.2	
Majority		64	2.6	
Turnout		2,429	39.1	
Liberal gain from Conservative		Swing		

=== Waterloo ===
Waterloo
Party	Candidate	Votes	%	±%
Conservative	D. Lockwood*	2,709	49.9	
Liberal	A. Green	2,036	37.5	
Labour	D. Summerville	681	12.6	
Majority		673	12.4	
Turnout		5,426	43.8	
Conservative hold		Swing		
