= List of electoral wards in Lancashire =

This is a list of electoral divisions and wards in the ceremonial county of Lancashire in North West England. All changes since the re-organisation of local government following the passing of the Local Government Act 1972 are shown. The number of councillors elected for each electoral division or ward is shown in brackets.

== County council ==
=== Lancashire ===
Electoral Divisions from 1 April 1974 (first election 12 April 1973) to 7 May 1981:

1. Accrington No. 1 (1)
2. Accrington No. 2 (1)
3. Accrington No. 3 (1)
4. Bacup (1)
5. Barnoldswick (1)
6. Blackburn No. 1 (1)
7. Blackburn No. 2 (1)
8. Blackburn No. 3 (1)
9. Blackburn No. 4 (1)
10. Blackburn No. 5 (1)
11. Blackburn No. 6 (1)
12. Blackburn No. 7 (1)
13. Blackburn Rural (1)
14. Blackpool No. 1 (1)
15. Blackpool No. 2 (1)
16. Blackpool No. 3 (1)
17. Blackpool No. 4 (1)
18. Blackpool No. 5 (1)
19. Blackpool No. 6 (1)
20. Blackpool No. 7 (1)
21. Blackpool No. 8 (1)
22. Blackpool No. 9 (1)
23. Blackpool No. 10 (1)
24. Blackpool No. 11 (1)
25. Brierfield (1)
26. Burnley No. 1 (1)
27. Burnley No. 2 (1)
28. Burnley No. 3 (1)
29. Burnley No. 4 (1)
30. Burnley No. 5 (1)
31. Burnley Rural (1)
32. Chorley North East (1)
33. Chorley Rural No. 1 (1)
34. Chorley Rural No. 2 (1)
35. Chorley Rural No. 3 (1)
36. Chorley South West (1)
37. Clayton-le-Moors (1)
38. Clitheroe (1)
39. Colne No. 1 (1)
40. Colne No. 2 (1)
41. Darwen No. 1 (1)
42. Darwen No. 2 (1)
43. Darwen No. 3 (1)
44. Fleetwood North (1)
45. Fleetwood South (1)
46. Fulwood No. 1 (1)
47. Fulwood No. 2 (1)
48. Fylde No. 1 (1)
49. Fylde No. 2 (1)
50. Garstang No. 1 (1)
51. Garstang No. 2 (1)
52. Great Harwood (1)
53. Haslingden (1)
54. Lancaster No. 1 (1)
55. Lancaster No. 2 (1)
56. Lancaster No. 3 (1)
57. Lancaster Rural No. 1 (1)
58. Lancaster Rural No. 2 (1)
59. Lancaster Rural No. 3 (1)
60. Leyland No. 1 (1)
61. Leyland No. 2 (1)
62. Longridge (1)
63. Lytham St Annes No. 1 (1)
64. Lytham St Annes No. 2 (1)
65. Lytham St Annes No. 3 (1)
66. Morecambe & Heysham No. 1 (1)
67. Morecambe & Heysham No. 2 (1)
68. Morecambe & Heysham No. 3 (1)
69. Nelson North (1)
70. Nelson South (1)
71. Ormskirk No. 1 (1)
72. Ormskirk No. 2 (1)
73. Oswaldtwistle (1)
74. Padiham (1)
75. Poulton-le-Fylde (1)
76. Preston No. 1 (2)
77. Preston No. 2 (1)
78. Preston No. 3 (1)
79. Preston No. 4 (2)
80. Preston No. 5 (1)
81. Preston Rural No. 1 (1)
82. Preston Rural No. 2 (1)
83. Preston Rural No. 3 (1)
84. Rawtenstall No. 1 (1)
85. Rawtenstall No. 2 (1)
86. Skelmersdale & Holland No. 1 (1)
87. Skelmersdale & Holland No. 2 (1)
88. Thornton Cleveleys No. 1 (1)
89. Thornton Cleveleys No. 2 (1)
90. Walton-le-Dale No. 1 (1)
91. Walton-le-Dale No. 2 (1)
92. West Lancashire No. 1 (1)
93. West Lancashire No. 2 (1)
94. Whitworth (1)

Electoral Divisions from 7 May 1981 to 5 May 2005:

1. Accrington Central (1)
2. Accrington South (1)
3. Alexandra & Victoria (1); electoral division abolished in 1998
4. Amounderness (1)
5. Anchorsholme & Norbreck (1); electoral division abolished in 1998
6. Bacup (1)
7. Bank Top & Brookhouse (1); electoral division abolished in 1998
8. Billinge & Revidge (1); electoral division abolished in 1998
9. Bispham & Ingthorpe (1); electoral division abolished in 1998
10. Brownhill & Pleckgate (1); electoral division abolished in 1998
11. Brunswick & Claremont (1); electoral division abolished in 1998
12. Burnley Central East (1)
13. Burnley Central West (1)
14. Burnley North East (1)
15. Burnley Rural (1)
16. Burnley South West (1)
17. Burnley West (1)
18. Cathedral & Green Bank (1); electoral division abolished in 1998
19. Chorley East (1)
20. Chorley North (1)
21. Chorley Rural East (1)
22. Chorley Rural North (1)
23. Chorley Rural West (1)
24. Chorley West (1)
25. Church & Accrington North (1)
26. Cleveleys (1)
27. Clifton & Marton (1); electoral division abolished in 1998
28. Clitheroe (1)
29. Colne (1)
30. Darwen South & Turton (1); electoral division abolished in 1998
31. Earcroft & West Rural (1); electoral division abolished in 1998
32. Ewood & Higher Croft (1); electoral division abolished in 1998
33. Foxhall & Talbot (1); electoral division abolished in 1998
34. Fylde East (1)
35. Fylde West (1)
36. Garstang (1)
37. Great Harwood (1)
38. Greenlands & Warbreck (1); electoral division abolished in 1998
39. Haslingden (1)
40. Hawes Side & Tyldesley (1); electoral division abolished in 1998
41. Hesketh (1)
42. Heysham (1)
43. Highfield & Stanley (1); electoral division abolished in 1998
44. Hillhouse (1)
45. Lancaster City (1)
46. Lancaster East (1)
47. Lancaster Rural Central (1)
48. Lancaster Rural North (1)
49. Lancaster Rural South (1)
50. Layton & Park (1); electoral division abolished in 1998
51. Longridge (1)
52. Lytham (1)
53. Marine (1)
54. Mill Hill & Moorgate (1); electoral division abolished in 1998
55. Morecambe East (1)
56. Morecambe West (1)
57. Nelson (1)
58. Ormskirk (1)
59. Oswaldtwistle (1)
60. Pendle East (1)
61. Pendle South (1)
62. Pendle West (1)
63. Poulton-le-Fylde (1)
64. Preston Central East (1)
65. Preston Central West (1)
66. Preston East (1)
67. Preston North (1)
68. Preston Rural East (1)
69. Preston Rural West (1)
70. Preston South East (1)
71. Preston South West (1)
72. Preston West (1)
73. Queens Park & Shadsworth (1); electoral division abolished in 1998
74. Ribble Valley North East (1)
75. Ribble Valley South West (1)
76. Rishton Clayton Altham (1)
77. Rossendale East (1)
78. Rossendale West (1)
79. Skelmersdale Central (1)
80. Skelmersdale East (1)
81. Skelmersdale West (1)
82. Skerton (1)
83. South Ribble Central (1)
84. South Ribble East (1)
85. South Ribble North (1)
86. South Ribble North West (1)
87. South Ribble South (1)
88. South Ribble South West (1)
89. South Ribble West (1)
90. Squires Gate & Waterloo (1); electoral division abolished in 1998
91. St Annes North (1)
92. St Annes South (1)
93. Sudell & Sunnyhurst (1); electoral division abolished in 1998
94. West Craven (1)
95. West Lancashire East (1)
96. West Lancashire North (1)
97. West Lancashire South (1)
98. Whitworth (1)
99. Wyre Side (1)

Electoral Divisions from 5 May 2005 to 4 May 2017:

1. Accrington North (1)
2. Accrington South (1)
3. Accrington West (1)
4. Amounderness (1)
5. Bamber Bridge & Walton-le-Dale (1)
6. Brierfield & Nelson North (1)
7. Burnley Central East (1)
8. Burnley Central West (1)
9. Burnley North East (1)
10. Burnley Rural (1)
11. Burnley South West (1)
12. Chorley East (1)
13. Chorley North (1)
14. Chorley Rural East (1)
15. Chorley Rural North (1)
16. Chorley Rural West (1)
17. Chorley South (1)
18. Chorley West (1)
19. Clitheroe (1)
20. Farington (1)
21. Fleetwood East (1)
22. Fleetwood West (1)
23. Fylde East (1)
24. Fylde South (1)
25. Fylde West (1)
26. Garstang (1)
27. Great Harwood (1)
28. Heysham (1)
29. Lancaster Central (1)
30. Lancaster East (1)
31. Lancaster Rural East (1)
32. Lancaster Rural North (1)
33. Lancaster South East (1)
34. Leyland Central (1)
35. Leyland South West (1)
36. Longridge with Bowland (1)
37. Lytham (1)
38. Morecambe North (1)
39. Morecambe South (1)
40. Morecambe West (1)
41. Nelson South (1)
42. Ormskirk West (1)
43. Oswaldtwistle (1)
44. Padiham & Burnley West (1)
45. Pendle Central (1)
46. Pendle East (1)
47. Pendle West (1)
48. Penwortham North (1)
49. Penwortham South (1)
50. Poulton-le-Fylde (1)
51. Preston Central North (1)
52. Preston Central South (1)
53. Preston City (1)
54. Preston East (1) †
55. Preston North (1)
56. Preston North East (1)
57. Preston North West (1)
58. Preston Rural (1) †
59. Preston South East (1)
60. Preston West (1)
61. Ribble Valley North East (1)
62. Ribble Valley South West (1)
63. Rishton & Clayton-le-Moors (1)
64. Rossendale East (1)
65. Rossendale North (1)
66. Rossendale South (1)
67. Rossendale West (1)
68. Skelmersdale Central (1)
69. Skelmersdale East (1)
70. Skelmersdale West (1) †
71. Skerton (1)
72. South Ribble Rural East (1)
73. South Ribble Rural West (1)
74. St Annes North (1)
75. St Annes South (1)
76. Thornton Cleveleys Central (1)
77. Thornton Cleveleys North (1)
78. West Craven (1)
79. West Lancashire East (1) †
80. West Lancashire North (1)
81. West Lancashire South (1) †
82. West Lancashire West (1)
83. Whitworth (1)
84. Wyreside (1)

† minor boundary changes in 2009

Electoral Divisions from 4 May 2017 to present:

1. Accrington North (1)
2. Accrington South (1)
3. Accrington West & Oswaldtwistle Central (1)
4. Brierfield & Nelson West (1)
5. Burnley Central East (1)
6. Burnley Central West (1)
7. Burnley North East (1)
8. Burnley Rural (1)
9. Burnley South West (1)
10. Burscough & Rufford (1)
11. Chorley Central (1)
12. Chorley North (1)
13. Chorley Rural East (1)
14. Chorley Rural West (1)
15. Chorley South (1)
16. Clayton with Whittle (1)
17. Cleveleys East (1)
18. Cleveleys South & Carleton (1)
19. Clitheroe (1)
20. Euxton, Buckshaw & Astley (1)
21. Fleetwood East (1)
22. Fleetwood West & Cleveleys West (1)
23. Fylde East (1)
24. Fylde South (1)
25. Fylde West (1)
26. Great Harwood, Rishton & Clayton-le-Moors (2)
27. Heysham (1)
28. Hoghton with Wheelton (1)
29. Lancaster Central (1)
30. Lancaster East (1)
31. Lancaster Rural East (1)
32. Lancaster Rural North (1)
33. Lancaster South East (1)
34. Leyland Central (1)
35. Leyland South (1)
36. Longridge with Bowland (1)
37. Lostock Hall & Bamber Bridge (1)
38. Lytham (1)
39. Mid-Rossendale (1)
40. Morecambe Central (1)
41. Morecambe North (1)
42. Morecambe South (1)
43. Moss Side & Farington (1)
44. Nelson East (1)
45. Ormskirk (1)
46. Oswaldtwistle (1)
47. Padiham & Burnley West (1)
48. Pendle Central (1)
49. Pendle Hill (1)
50. Pendle Rural (2)
51. Penwortham East & Walton-le-Dale (1)
52. Penwortham West (1)
53. Poulton-le-Fylde (1)
54. Preston Central East (1)
55. Preston Central West (1)
56. Preston City (1)
57. Preston East (1)
58. Preston North (1)
59. Preston Rural (1)
60. Preston South East (1)
61. Preston South West (1)
62. Preston West (1)
63. Ribble Valley North East (1)
64. Ribble Valley South West (1)
65. Rossendale East (1)
66. Rossendale South (1)
67. Rossendale West (1)
68. Skelmersdale Central (1)
69. Skelmersdale East (1)
70. Skelmersdale West (1)
71. Skerton (1)
72. South Ribble East (1)
73. South Ribble West (1)
74. St Annes North (1)
75. St Annes South (1)
76. Thornton & Hambleton (1)
77. West Lancashire East (1)
78. West Lancashire North (1)
79. West Lancashire West (1)
80. Whitworth & Bacup (1)
81. Wyre Rural Central (1)
82. Wyre Rural East (1)

== Unitary authority councils ==
=== Blackburn with Darwen ===
Wards from 1 April 1974 (first election 7 June 1973) to 3 May 1979:

Wards from 3 May 1979 to 1 May 1997:

Wards from 1 May 1997 to 10 June 2004:

1. Audley (3)
2. Bastwell (3)
3. Beardwood with Lammack (3)
4. Corporation Park (3)
5. Earcroft (3)
6. East Rural (1)
7. Ewood (3)
8. Higher Croft (3)
9. Little Harwood with Whitebirk (3)
10. Livesey with Pleasington (3)
11. Marsh House (3)
12. Meadowhead (3)
13. Mill Hill (3)
14. North Turton with Tockholes (2)
15. Queen’s Park (3)
16. Roe Lee (3)
17. Shadsworth (3)
18. Shear Brow (3)
19. Sudell (3)
20. Sunnyhurst (3)
21. Wensley Fold (3)
22. Whitehall (2)

Wards from 10 June 2004 to 3 May 2018:

1. Audley (3)
2. Bastwell (3)
3. Beardwood with Lammack (3)
4. Corporation Park (3)
5. Earcroft (2)
6. East Rural (1)
7. Ewood (3)
8. Fernhurst (3)
9. Higher Croft (3)
10. Little Harwood (3)
11. Livesey with Pleasington (3)
12. Marsh House (3)
13. Meadowhead (3)
14. Mill Hill (3)
15. North Turton with Tockholes (2)
16. Queen’s Park (3)
17. Roe Lee (3)
18. Shadsworth with Whitebirk (3)
19. Shear Brow (3)
20. Sudell (3)
21. Sunnyhurst (3)
22. Wensley Fold (3)
23. Whitehall (2)

Wards from 3 May 2018 to present:

1. Audley and Queens Park (3)
2. Bastwell and Daisyfield (3)
3. Billinge and Beardwood (3)
4. Blackburn Central (3)
5. Blackburn South and Lower Darwen (3)
6. Blackburn South East (3)
7. Darwen East (3)
8. Darwen South (3)
9. Darwen West (3)
10. Ewood (3)
11. Little Harwood and Whitebirk (3)
12. Livesey with Pleasington (3)
13. Mill Hill and Moorgate (3)
14. Roe Lee (3)
15. Shear Brow and Corporation Park (3)
16. Wensley Fold (3)
17. West Pennine (3)

=== Blackpool ===
Wards from 1 April 1974 (first election 7 June 1973) to 6 May 1976:

Wards from 6 May 1976 to 1 May 1997:

Wards from 1 May 1997 to 1 May 2003:

1. Alexandra (2)
2. Anchorsholme (2)
3. Bispham (2)
4. Brunswick (2)
5. Claremont (2)
6. Clifton (2)
7. Foxhall (2)
8. Greenlands (2)
9. Hawes Side (2)
10. Highfield (2)
11. Ingthorpe (2)
12. Layton (2)
13. Marton (2)
14. Norbreck (2)
15. Park (2)
16. Squires Gate (2)
17. Stanley (2)
18. Talbot (2)
19. Tyldesley (2)
20. Victoria (2)
21. Warbreck (2)
22. Waterloo (2)

Wards from 1 May 2003 to 4 May 2023: and 4 May 2023 to present (no change to names of wards):

1. Anchorsholme (2)
2. Bispham (2)
3. Bloomfield (2)
4. Brunswick (2)
5. Claremont (2)
6. Clifton (2)
7. Greenlands (2)
8. Hawes Side (2)
9. Highfield (2)
10. Ingthorpe (2)
11. Layton (2)
12. Marton (2)
13. Norbreck (2)
14. Park (2)
15. Squires Gate (2)
16. Stanley (2)
17. Talbot (2)
18. Tyldesley (2)
19. Victoria (2)
20. Warbreck (2)
21. Waterloo (2)

== District councils ==
=== Burnley ===
Wards from 1 April 1974 (first election 7 June 1973) to 6 May 1976:

Wards from 6 May 1976 to 2 May 1991:

Wards from 2 May 1991 to 2 May 2002:

1. Bank Hall (3)
2. Barclay (3)
3. Briercliffe (3)
4. Brunshaw (3)
5. Cliviger with Worsthorne (3)
6. Coal Clough with Deerplay (3)
7. Daneshouse (3)
8. Fulledge (3)
9. Gawthorpe (3)
10. Hapton with Park (3)
11. Lanehead (3)
12. Lower-house (3)
13. Queensgate (3)
14. Rosehill (3)
15. Trinity (3)
16. Whittlefield with Ightenhill ()

Wards from 2 May 2002 to present:

1. Bank Hall (3)
2. Briercliffe (3)
3. Brunshaw (3)
4. Cliviger with Worsthorne (3)
5. Coal Clough with Deerplay (3)
6. Daneshouse with Stoneyholme (3)
7. Gannow (3)
8. Gawthorpe (3)
9. Hapton with Park (3)
10. Lanehead (3)
11. Queensgate (3)
12. Rosegrove with Lowerhouse (3)
13. Rosehill with Burnley Wood (3)
14. Trinity (3)
15. Whittlefield with Ightenhill (3)

=== Chorley ===
Wards from 1 April 1974 (first election 7 June 1973) to 6 May 1976:

Wards from 6 May 1976 to 2 May 2002:

Wards from 2 May 2002 to 6 May 2021:

1. Adlington & Anderton (3)
2. Astley & Buckshaw (2)
3. Brindle & Hoghton (1)
4. Chisnall (2)
5. Chorley East (3)
6. Chorley North East (3)
7. Chorley North West (3)
8. Chorley South East (3)
9. Chorley South West (3)
10. Clayton-le-Woods & Whittle-le-Woods (3)
11. Clayton-le-Woods North (3)
12. Clayton-le-Woods West & Cuerden (2)
13. Coppull (3)
14. Eccleston & Mawdesley (3)
15. Euxton North (2)
16. Euxton South (2)
17. Heath Charnock & Rivington (1)
18. Lostock (2)
19. Pennine (1)
20. Wheelton & Withnell (2)

Wards from 6 May 2021 to present:

1. Adlington & Anderton (3)
2. Buckshaw & Whittle (3)
3. Chorley East (3)
4. Chorley North East (3)
5. Chorley North West (3)
6. Chorley North & Astley (3)
7. Chorley South East & Heath Charnock (3)
8. Chorley South West (3)
9. Clayton East, Brindle & Hoghton (3)
10. Clayton West & Cuerden (3)
11. Coppull (3)
12. Croston, Mawdesley & Euxton South (3)
13. Eccleston, Heskin & Charnock Richard (3)
14. Euxton

=== Fylde ===
Wards from 1 April 1974 (first election 7 June 1973) to 6 May 1976:

Wards from 6 May 1976 to 1 May 2003:

Wards from 1 May 2003 to 4 May 2023:

1. Ansdell (3)
2. Ashton (3)
3. Central (3)
4. Clifton (3)
5. Elswick & Little Eccleston (1)
6. Fairhaven (3)
7. Freckleton East (2)
8. Freckleton West (2)
9. Heyhouses (3)
10. Kilnhouse (3)
11. Kirkham North (3)
12. Kirkham South (2)
13. Medlar-with-Wesham (2)
14. Newton & Treales (2)
15. Park (3)
16. Ribby-with-Wrea (1)
17. Singleton & Greenhalgh (1)
18. Staining & Weeton (2)
19. St Johns (3)
20. St Leonards (3)
21. Warton & Westby (3)

Wards from 4 May 2023 to present:

1. Ansdell & Fairhaven (2)
2. Ashton (3)
3. Carnegie (2)
4. Freckleton Village (2)
5. Heyhouses (3)
6. Kilgrimol (2)
7. Kilnhouse (3)
8. Kirkham (3)
9. Lytham East (2)
10. Lytham West (2)
11. Medlar-with-Wesham (2)
12. Park (2)
13. Rural East Fylde (2)
14. Rural North Fylde (2)
15. Staining (1)
16. Warton (2)
17. Wrea Green with Westby (2)

=== Hyndburn ===
Wards from 1 April 1974 (first election 7 June 1973) to 3 May 1979:

Wards from 3 May 1979 to 2 May 2002:

Wards from 2 May 2002 to present:

1. Altham (2)
2. Barnfield (2)
3. Baxenden (2)
4. Central (2)
5. Church (2)
6. Clayton-le-Moors (2)
7. Huncoat (2)
8. Immanuel (2)
9. Milnshaw (2)
10. Netherton (2)
11. Overton (3)
12. Peel (2)
13. Rishton (3)
14. St Andrew's (2)
15. St Oswald's (3)
16. Spring Hill (2)

=== Lancaster ===
Wards from 1 April 1974 (first election 7 June 1973) to 3 May 1979:

Wards from 3 May 1979 to 1 May 2003:

Wards from 1 May 2003 to 7 May 2015:

1. Bare (2)
2. Bolton-le-Sands (2)
3. Bulk (3)
4. Carnforth (2)
5. Castle (3)
6. Duke's (1)
7. Ellel (2)
8. Halton-with-Aughton (1)
9. Harbour (3)
10. Heysham Central (2)
11. Heysham North (2)
12. Heysham South (3)
13. John O'Gaunt (3)
14. Kellet (1)
15. Lower Lune Valley (2)
16. Overton (1)
17. Poulton (3)
18. Scotforth East (2)
19. Scotforth West (3)
20. Silverdale (1)
21. Skerton East (3)
22. Skerton West (3)
23. Slyne-with-Hest (2)
24. Torrisholme (3)
25. University (2)
26. Upper Lune Valley (1)
27. Warton (1)
28. Westgate (3)

Wards from 7 May 2015 to 4 May 2023:

1. Bare (3)
2. Bolton & Slyne (3)
3. Bulk (3)
4. Carnforth & Millhead (3)
5. Castle (2)
6. Ellel (2)
7. Halton-with-Aughton (1)
8. Harbour (3)
9. Heysham Central (2)
10. Heysham North (2)
11. Heysham South (3)
12. John O’Gaunt (3)
13. Kellet (1)
14. Lower Lune Valley (2)
15. Marsh (2)
16. Overton (1)
17. Poulton (2)
18. Scotforth East (2)
19. Scotforth West (3)
20. Silverdale (1)
21. Skerton East (3)
22. Skerton West (3)
23. Torrisholme (2)
24. University & Scotforth Rural (3)
25. Upper Lune Valley (1)
26. Warton (1)
27. Westgate (3)

Wards from 4 May 2023 to present:

1. Bare (3)
2. Bolton & Slyne (3)
3. Bowerham (2)
4. Bulk (3)
5. Carnforth & Millhead (3)
6. Castle (3)
7. Ellel (2)
8. Halton-with-Aughton & Kellet (2)
9. Heysham Central (2)
10. Heysham North (2)
11. Heysham South (3)
12. John O’Gaunt (2)
13. Lower Lune Valley (2)
14. Marsh (3)
15. Overton (1)
16. Poulton (2)
17. Scale Hall (3)
18. Scotforth East (2)
19. Scotforth West (2)
20. Silverdale (1)
21. Skerton (3)
22. Torrisholme (2)
23. University (2)
24. Upper Lune Valley (1)
25. Warton (1)
26. West End (3)
27. Westgate (3)

=== Pendle ===
Wards from 1 April 1974 (first election 7 June 1973) to 6 May 1976:

Wards from 6 May 1976 to 2 May 2002:

Wards from 2 May 2002 to 6 May 2021:

1. Barrowford (3)
2. Blacko & Higherford (1)
3. Boulsworth (3)
4. Bradley (3)
5. Brierfield (3)
6. Clover Hill (3)
7. Coates (3)
8. Craven (3)
9. Earby (3)
10. Foulridge (1)
11. Higham & Pendleside (1)
12. Horsfield (3)
13. Marsden (2)
14. Old Laund Booth (1)
15. Reedley (3)
16. Southfield (3)
17. Vivary Bridge (3)
18. Walverden (2)
19. Waterside (3)
20. Whitefield (2)

Wards from 6 May 2021 to present:

1. Barnoldswick (3)
2. Barrowford & Pendleside (3)
3. Boulsworth & Foulridge (3)
4. Bradley (3)
5. Brierfield East & Clover Hill (3)
6. Brierfield West & Reedley (2)
7. Earby & Coates (3)
8. Fence & Higham (1)
9. Marsden & Southfield (3)
10. Vivary Bridge (3)
11. Waterside & Horsfield (3)
12. Whitefield & Walverden (3)

=== Preston ===
Wards from 1 April 1974 (first election 7 June 1973) to 6 May 1976:

Wards from 6 May 1976 to 3 May 1990:

Wards from 3 May 1990 to 2 May 2002:

1. Ashton (3)
2. Avenham (3)
3. Brookfield (3)
4. Cadley (3)
5. Central (3)
6. Deepdale (3)
7. Fishwick (3)
8. Greyfriars (3)
9. Ingol (3)
10. Larches (3)
11. Moor Park (3)
12. Preston Rural East (3)
13. Preston Rural West (3)
14. Ribbleton (3)
15. Riversway (3)
16. St Matthew's (3)
17. Sharoe Green (3)
18. Sherwood (3)
19. Tulketh (3)

Wards from 2 May 2002 to 2 May 2019:

1. Ashton (2)
2. Brookfield (3) †
3. Cadley (2)
4. College (2)
5. Deepdale (2)
6. Fishwick (2)
7. Garrison (3)
8. Greyfriars (3)
9. Ingol (3)
10. Larches (3)
11. Lea (3)
12. Moor Park (2)
13. Preston Rural East (2) †
14. Preston Rural North (3)
15. Ribbleton (3) †
16. Riversway (3)
17. Sharoe Green (3)
18. St George's (2)
19. St Matthew's (3)
20. Town Centre (3)
21. Tulketh (3)
22. University (2)

† minor boundary changes in 2007

Wards from 2 May 2019 to present:

1. Ashton (3)
2. Brookfield (3)
3. Cadley (3)
4. City Centre (3)
5. Deepdale (3)
6. Fishwick & Frenchwood (3)
7. Garrison (3)
8. Greyfriars (3)
9. Ingol & Cottam (3)
10. Lea & larches (3)
11. Plungington (3)
12. Preston Rural East (3)
13. Preston Rural North (3)
14. Ribbleton (3)
15. Sharoe Green (3)
16. St Matthew's (3)

=== Ribble Valley ===
Wards from 1 April 1974 (first election 7 June 1973) to 6 May 1976:

Wards from 6 May 1976 to 1 May 2003:

Wards from 1 May 2003 to 2 May 2019:

1. Aighton, Bailey & Chaigley (1)
2. Alston & Hothersall (2)
3. Billington & Old Langho (2)
4. Bowland, Newton & Slaidburn (1)
5. Chatburn (1)
6. Chipping (1)
7. Clayton-le-Dale with Ramsgreave (2)
8. Derby & Thornley (2)
9. Dilworth (2)
10. Edisford & Low Moor (2)
11. Gisburn, Rimington (1)
12. Langho (2)
13. Littlemoor (2)
14. Mellor (2)
15. Primrose (2)
16. Read & Simonstone (2)
17. Ribchester (1)
18. St Mary's (2)
19. Sabden (1)
20. Salthill (2)
21. Waddington & West Bradford (2)
22. Whalley (2)
23. Wilpshire (2)
24. Wiswell & Pendleton (1)

Wards from 2 May 2019 to present:

1. Alston & Hothersall (2)
2. Billington & Langho (2)
3. Bowland (1)
4. Brockhall & Dinckley (1)
5. Chatburn (1)
6. Chipping (1)
7. Clayton-le-Dale & Salesbury (1)
8. Derby & Thornley (2)
9. Dilworth (2)
10. East Whalley, Read & Simonstone (2)
11. Edisford & Low Moor (2)
12. Gisburn & Rimington (1)
13. Hurst Green & Whitewell (1)
14. Littlemoor (2)
15. Mellor (2)
16. Primrose (2)
17. Ribchester (1)
18. Sabden (1)
19. Salthill (2)
20. St Mary's (2)
21. Waddington, Bashall Eaves & Mitton (1)
22. West Bradford & Grindleton (1)
23. Whalley & Painter Wood (2)
24. Whalley Nethertown (1)
25. Wilpshire & Ramsgreave (2)
26. Wiswell & Barrow (2)

=== Rossendale ===
Wards from 1 April 1974 (first election 7 June 1973) to 6 May 1976:

Wards from 6 May 1976 to 2 May 2002:

Wards from 2 May 2002 to 2 May 2024:

1. Cribden (2)
2. Eden (2)
3. Facit & Shawforth (2)
4. Goodshaw (2)
5. Greenfield (3)
6. Greensclough (3)
7. Hareholme (3)
8. Healey & Whitworth (2)
9. Helmshore (3)
10. Irwell (3)
11. Longholme (3)
12. Stacksteads (2)
13. Whitewell (3)
14. Worsley (3)

Wards from 2 May 2024 to present:

1. Bacup (3)
2. Britannia & Lee Mill (3)
3. Goodshaw & Cribden (3)
4. Greenfield & Eden (3)
5. Hareholme & Waterfoot (3)
6. Haslingden (3)
7. Helmshore (3)
8. Longholme (3)
9. Whitewell & Stacksteads (3)
10. Whitworth (3)

=== South Ribble ===
Wards from 1 April 1974 (first election 7 June 1973) to 6 May 1976:

Wards from 6 May 1976 to 7 May 1987:

Wards from 7 May 1987 to 1 May 2003:

1. All Saints (3)
2. Bamber Bridge Central (3)
3. Bamber Bridge South (3)
4. Charnock (1)
5. Farington (3)
6. Howick (2)
7. Hutton & New Longton (3)
8. Kingsfold (3)
9. Leyland Central (2)
10. Leyland St Ambrose (2)
11. Leyland St John's (3)
12. Leyland St Mary's (3)
13. Little Hoole & Much Hoole (2)
14. Longton Central & West (3)
15. Lostock Hall (3)
16. Manor (2)
17. Middleforth Green (2)
18. Moss Side (3)
19. Priory (2)
20. Samlesbury & Cuerdale (1)
21. Seven Stars (2)
22. Walton-le-Dale (3)

Wards from 1 May 2003 to 7 May 2015:

1. Bamber Bridge East (2)
2. Bamber Bridge North (2)
3. Bamber Bridge West (2)
4. Broad Oak (2)
5. Charnock (2)
6. Coupe Green & Gregson Lane (2)
7. Earnshaw Bridge (2)
8. Farington East (2)
9. Farington West (2)
10. Golden Hill (2)
11. Howick & Priory (2)
12. Kingsfold (2)
13. Leyland Central (2)
14. Leyland St Ambrose (2)
15. Leyland St Mary's (2)
16. Little Hoole & Much Hoole (2)
17. Longton & Hutton West (3)
18. Lostock Hall (2)
19. Lowerhouse (2)
20. Middleforth (2)
21. Moss Side (2)
22. New Longton & Hutton East (2)
23. Samlesbury & Walton (2)
24. Seven Stars (2)
25. Tardy Gate (2)
26. Walton-le-Dale (2)
27. Whitefield (2)

Wards from 7 May 2015 to present:

1. Bamber Bridge East (2)
2. Bamber Bridge West (2)
3. Broad Oak (2)
4. Broadfield (2)
5. Buckshaw & Worden (2)
6. Charnock (2)
7. Coupe Green & Gregson Lane (2)
8. Earnshaw Bridge (2)
9. Farington East (2)
10. Farington West (2)
11. Hoole (2)
12. Howick & Priory (3)
13. Leyland Central (2)
14. Longton & Hutton West (3)
15. Lostock Hall (3)
16. Middleforth (3)
17. Moss Side (2)
18. New Longton & Hutton East (2)
19. St Ambrose (2)
20. Samlesbury & Walton (2)
21. Seven Stars (2)
22. Walton-le-Dale East (2)
23. Walton-le-Dale West (2)

=== West Lancashire ===
Wards from 1 April 1974 (first election 7 June 1973) to 6 May 1976:

Wards from 6 May 1976 to 2 May 2002:

Wards from 2 May 2002 to 4 May 2023:

1. Ashurst (3)
2. Aughton Park (2)
3. Aughton & Downholland (3)
4. Bickerstaffe (1) †
5. Birch Green (2)
6. Burscough East (2)
7. Burscough West (2)
8. Derby (3) †
9. Digmoor (2)
10. Halsall (1)
11. Hesketh-with-Becconsall (2)
12. Knowsley (3)
13. Moorside (2)
14. Newburgh (1) †
15. North Meols (2)
16. Parbold (2)
17. Rufford (1)
18. Scarisbrick (2)
19. Scott (3)
20. Skelmersdale North (2)
21. Skelmersdale South (3) †
22. Tanhouse (2)
23. Tarleton (3)
24. Up Holland (3)
25. Wrightington (2)

† minor boundary changes in 2007

Wards from 4 May 2023 to present:

1. Aughton & Holborn (3)
2. Burscough Bridge & Rufford (3)
3. Burscough Town (3)
4. North Meols & Hesketh Bank (3)
5. Old Skelmersdale (3)
6. Ormskirk East (3)
7. Ormskirk West (3)
8. Rural North East (3)
9. Rural South (3)
10. Rural West (3)
11. Skelmersdale North (3)
12. Skelmersdale South (3)
13. Tanhouse & Skelmersdale Town Centre (3)
14. Tarleton Village (3)
15. Up Holland (3)

=== Wyre ===
Wards from 1 April 1974 (first election 7 June 1973) to 3 May 1979:

Wards from 3 May 1979 to 1 May 2003:

Wards from 1 May 2003 to 7 May 2015:

1. Bourne (3)
2. Breck (2)
3. Brock (1)
4. Calder (1)
5. Carleton (2)
6. Catterall (1)
7. Cleveleys Park (3)
8. Cabus (1)
9. Garstang (3)
10. Great Eccleston (2)
11. Hambleton & Stalmine-with-Staynall (2)
12. Hardhorn (2)
13. High Cross (2)
14. Jubilee (2)
15. Mount (2)
16. Norcross (2)
17. Park (2)
18. Pharos (3)
19. Pilling (1)
20. Preesall (3)
21. Rossall (3)
22. Staina (3)
23. Tithebarn (2)
24. Victoria (3)
25. Warren (3)
26. Wyresdale (1)

Wards from 7 May 2015 to present:

1. Bourne (3)
2. Breck (2)
3. Brock with Catterall (2)
4. Calder (1)
5. Carleton (2)
6. Cleveleys Park (2)
7. Garstang (3)
8. Great Eccleston (2)
9. Hambleton & Stalmine (2)
10. Hardhorn with High Cross (3)
11. Jubilee (2)
12. Marsh Mill (3)
13. Mount (2)
14. Park (2)
15. Pharos (2)
16. Pheasant’s Wood (1)
17. Pilling (1)
18. Preesall (3)
19. Rossall (3)
20. Stanah (2)
21. Tithebarn (2)
22. Victoria & Norcross (2)
23. Warren (2)
24. Wyresdale (1)

== Electoral wards by constituency ==
Wards as they existed on 1 December 2020.

=== Blackburn ===
Blackburn with Darwen: Audley & Queen’s Park; Bastwell & Daisyfield; Billinge & Beardwood; Blackburn Central; Blackburn South East; Ewood; Little Harwood & Whitebirk; Livesey with Pleasington; Mill Hill & Moorgate; Roe Lee; Shear Brow & Corporation Park; Wensley Fold.

=== Blackpool North and Fleetwood ===
Blackpool: Anchorsholme; Bispham; Greenlands; Ingthorpe; Norbreck.

Wyre: Bourne; Carleton; Cleveleys Park; Jubilee; Marsh Mill; Mount; Park; Pharos; Pheasant’s Wood; Rossall; Stanah; Victoria & Norcross; Warren.

=== Blackpool South ===
Blackpool: Bloomfield; Brunswick; Claremont; Clifton; Hawes Side; Highfield; Layton; Marton; Park; Squires Gate; Stanley; Talbot; Tyldesley; Victoria; Warbreck; Waterloo.

=== Burnley ===
Burnley: Bank Hall; Briercliffe; Brunshaw; Cliviger with Worsthorne; Coal Clough with Deerplay; Daneshouse with Stoneyholme; Gannow; Gawthorpe; Hapton with Park; Lanehead; Queensgate; Rosegrove with Lowerhouse; Rosehill with Burnley Wood; Trinity; Whittlefield with Ightenhill.

Pendle: Brierfield East & Clover Hill; Brierfield West & Reedley.

=== Chorley ===
Chorley: Adlington & Anderton; Buckshaw & Whittle; Chorley East; Chorley North & Astley; Chorley North East; Chorley North West; Chorley South East & Heath Charnock; Chorley South West; Clayton East, Brindle & Hoghton; Clayton West & Cuerden; Coppull; Euxton.

=== Fylde ===
Fylde: Ansdell; Ashton; Central; Clifton; Elswick & Little Eccleston; Fairhaven; Freckleton East; Freckleton West; Heyhouses; Kilnhouse; Kirkham North; Kirkham South; Medlar-with-Wesham; Newton & Treales; Park; Ribby-with-Wrea; Singleton & Greenhalgh; Staining & Weeton; St Johns; St Leonards; Warton & Westby.

Wyre: Breck; Hardhorn with High Cross; Tithebarn.

=== Hyndburn ===
Hyndburn: Altham; Barnfield; Baxenden; Central; Church; Clayton-le-Moors; Huncoat; Immanuel; Milnshaw; Netherton; Overton; Peel; Rishton; St Andrew's; St Oswald's; Spring Hill.

Rossendale: Greenfield; Worsley.

=== Lancaster and Wyre ===
Lancaster: Bulk; Castle; Ellel; John O’Gaunt; Marsh; Scotforth East; Scotforth West; Skerton East; Skerton West; University & Scotforth Rural.

Wyre: Brock with Catterall; Calder; Garstang; Great Eccleston; Hambleton & Stalmine; Pilling; Preesall; Wyresdale.

=== Morecambe and Lunesdale (part) ===
Lancaster: Bare; Bolton & Slyne; Carnforth & Millhead; Halton-with-Aughton; Harbour; Heysham Central; Heysham North; Heysham South; Kellet; Lower Lune Valley; Overton; Poulton; Silverdale; Torrisholme; Upper Lune Valley; Warton; Westgate.

=== Pendle and Clitheroe ===
Pendle: Barnoldswick; Barrowford & Pendleside; Boulsworth & Foulridge; Bradley; Earby & Coates; Fence & Higham; Marsden & Southfield; Vivary Bridge; Waterside & Horsfield; Whitefield & Walverden.

Ribble Valley: Chatburn; East Whalley, Read & Simonstone; Edisford & Low Moor; Littlemoor; Primrose; Sabden; St. Mary’s; Salthill; Whalley & Painter Wood; Wiswell & Barrow.

=== Preston ===
Preston: Ashton; Brookfield; Cadley; City Centre; Deepdale; Fishwick & Frenchwood; Garrison; Ingol & Cottam; Lea & Larches; Plungington; Ribbleton; St. Matthew’s.

=== Ribble Valley ===
Preston: Greyfriars; Preston Rural East; Preston Rural North; Sharoe Green.

Ribble Valley: Alston & Hothersall; Billington & Langho; Bowland; Brockhall & Dinckley; Chipping; Clayton-le-Dale & Salesbury; Derby & Thornley; Dilworth; Gisburn & Rimington; Hurst Green & Whitewell; Mellor; Ribchester; Waddington, Bashall Eaves & Mitton; West Bradford & Grindleton; Whalley Nethertown; Wilpshire & Ramsgreave.

South Ribble: Bamber Bridge East; Bamber Bridge West; Coupe Green & Gregson Lane; Lostock Hall; Samlesbury & Walton; Walton-le-Dale East; Walton-le-Dale West.

=== Rossendale and Darwen ===
Blackburn with Darwen: Blackburn South & Lower Darwen; Darwen East; Darwen South; Darwen West; West Pennine.

Rossendale: Cribden; Eden; Facit & Shawforth; Goodshaw; Greensclough; Hareholme; Healey & Whitworth; Helmshore; Irwell; Longholme; Stacksteads; Whitewell.

=== South Ribble ===
Chorley: Croston, Mawdesley & Euxton South; Eccleston, Heskin & Charnock Richard.

South Ribble: Broad Oak; Broadfield; Buckshaw & Worden; Charnock; Earnshaw Bridge; Farington East; Farington West; Hoole; Howick & Priory; Leyland Central; Longton & Hutton West; Middleforth; Moss Side; New Longton & Hutton East; St. Ambrose; Seven Stars.

=== Southport (part) ===
West Lancashire: Hesketh-with-Becconsall; North Meols; Rufford; Tarleton.

=== West Lancashire ===
West Lancashire: Ashurst; Aughton & Downholland; Aughton Park; Bickerstaffe; Birch Green; Burscough East; Burscough West; Derby; Digmoor; Halsall; Knowsley; Moorside; Newburgh; Parbold; Scarisbrick; Scott; Skelmersdale North; Skelmersdale South; Tanhouse; Up Holland; Wrightington.

== See also ==
- List of parliamentary constituencies in Lancashire
