= 2000 Blackpool Borough Council election =

2000 UK local government election

The 2000 Blackpool Borough Council election took place on 4 May 2000 to elect members of Blackpool Borough Council in England. The whole council was up for election and the Labour Party stayed in overall control of the council.

== Election result ==
Blackpool local election result 2000
Party	Seats	Gains	Losses	Net gain/loss	Seats %	Votes %	Votes	+/−
Labour	24			-9	54.55			
Conservative	16			+8	36.36			
Liberal Democrats	4			+1	9.09			
