= 2007 Blackpool Borough Council election =

Map of the results of the 2007 Blackpool council election. Conservatives in blue, Labour in red and Liberal Democrats in yellow.

The 2007 Blackpool Borough Council election took place on 3 May 2007 to elect members of the unitary Blackpool Borough Council in England. The whole council was up for election and the Conservative Party gained overall control of the council from the Labour Party.

== Election result ==
Blackpool local election result 2007
Party	Seats	Gains	Losses	Net gain/loss	Seats %	Votes %	Votes	+/−
Conservative	26	13	0	+13	61.9	47.3	37,148	+8.7
Labour	13	0	12	-12	31.0	34.4	27,034	-8.3
Liberal Democrats	3	1	2	-1	7.1	13.9	10,919	-2.9
BNP	0	0	0	0	0.0	3.0	2,371	+3.0
UKIP	0	0	0	0	0.0	0.5	399	+0.3
Mums' Army	0	0	0	0	0.0	0.3	219	+0.3
Independent	0	0	0	0	0.0	0.3	202	-1.4
UK F.A.G.S.	0	0	0	0	0.0	0.2	193	+0.2

== Ward results ==
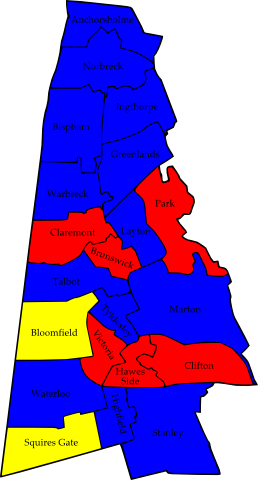
2007 map with ward names coloured with party whose candidate received the most votes.

=== Anchorsholme ===
Anchorsholme (2)
Party	Candidate	Votes	%	±%
Conservative	Tony Williams	950	19.31	+3.91
Conservative	Michael Jebson	911	18.52	+3.71
Liberal Democrats	Jon Bamborough	891	18.11	−5.53
Liberal Democrats	Steven Bate	802	16.30	−4.49
Labour	Betty Bradford	700	14.23	+1.04
Labour	Daniel Bradford	665	13.52	+1.35
Turnout				
Conservative gain from Liberal Democrats		Swing		
Conservative gain from Liberal Democrats		Swing		

=== Bispham ===
Bispham (2)
Party	Candidate	Votes	%	±%
Conservative	Don Clapham	1,329	31.93	+0.88
Conservative	Henry Mitchell	1,274	30.61	+0.58
Labour	Alan Haynes	502	12.06	−4.04
Labour	Christopher Ryan	419	10.07	−4.71
BNP	Susan Kelly	366	8.79	+8.79
Liberal Democrats	Steven Farley	272	6.54	−1.44
Turnout				
Conservative hold		Swing		
Conservative hold		Swing		

=== Bloomfield ===
Bloomfield (2)
Party	Candidate	Votes	%	±%
Liberal Democrats	Doreen Holt	555	18.99	+1.24
Labour	Mary Smith	502	17.17	−1.56
Labour	Roger Cooke	466	15.94	−2.13
Liberal Democrats	Michael Hodkinson	414	14.16	−0.93
Conservative	Ephraim Bell	317	10.85	−4.53
Conservative	Ian Dodd	274	9.37	−5.60
Independent	John Finlay	202	6.91	+6.91
UK F.A.G.S.	Hamish Howitt	193	6.60	+6.60
Turnout				
Liberal Democrats gain from Labour		Swing		
Labour hold		Swing		

=== Brunswick ===
Brunswick (2)
Party	Candidate	Votes	%	±%
Labour	Gary Coleman	796	26.83	−3.94
Labour	Simon Blackburn	775	26.12	−4.18
Conservative	Pat Mancini	602	20.29	+6.86
Conservative	Peter Watson	561	18.91	+6.38
UKIP	Colin Porter	233	7.85	+2.86
Turnout				
Labour hold		Swing		
Labour hold		Swing		

=== Claremont ===
Claremont (2)
Party	Candidate	Votes	%	±%
Labour	Ivan Taylor	780	23.80	−5.02
Labour	Sylvia Taylor	693	21.15	−6.10
Conservative	May Ashford	521	15.90	−1.32
Conservative	Philip Cartwright	477	14.56	−1.71
Liberal Democrats	Susan Close	281	8.57	+1.86
BNP	Chris Ryan	275	8.39	+8.39
Liberal Democrats	Richard Powell	250	7.63	+7.63
Turnout				
Labour hold		Swing		
Labour hold		Swing		

=== Clifton ===
Clifton (2)
Party	Candidate	Votes	%	±%
Labour	Joan Greenhalgh	801	24.70	−5.35
Conservative	Joe Best	749	23.10	+4.24
Labour	Michael Carr	703	21.68	−4.86
Conservative	Marlene McGuirk	703	21.68	+5.57
Liberal Democrats	Stuart Mackie	287	8.85	+0.41
Turnout				
Labour hold		Swing		
Conservative gain from Labour		Swing		

=== Greenlands ===
Greenlands (2)
Party	Candidate	Votes	%	±%
Conservative	Julian Mineur	948	23.75	+2.75
Conservative	Steve Houghton	886	22.20	+1.29
Labour	Kathryn Benson	786	19.69	−5.39
Labour	Bob Harrison	687	17.21	−6.57
BNP	Jonathan Murphy	370	9.27	+9.27
Liberal Democrats	Barbara Bamborough	314	7.87	−1.36
Turnout				
Conservative gain from Labour		Swing		
Conservative gain from Labour		Swing		

=== Hawes Side ===
Hawes Side (2)
Party	Candidate	Votes	%	±%
Labour	Norman Hardy	789	21.81	−6.93
Labour	Valerie Haynes	757	20.92	−6.16
Conservative	Jean Kenrick	664	18.35	+0.68
Conservative	Barry Wells	554	15.31	−2.02
BNP	Irene Cain	369	10.20	+10.20
Liberal Democrats	Patricia Rawson	266	7.35	−1.83
Mums' Army	Bev Warren	219	6.05	+6.05
Turnout				
Labour hold		Swing		
Labour hold		Swing		

=== Highfield ===
Highfield (2)
Party	Candidate	Votes	%	±%
Conservative	Lily Henderson	1,092	28.30	+3.84
Conservative	Susan Fowler	1,086	28.14	+4.27
Labour	Gillian Campbell	544	14.10	−4.52
Labour	Pamela Jackson	539	13.97	−5.70
BNP	Roy Goodwin	339	8.78	+8.78
Liberal Democrats	Alma Rollinson	259	6.71	−6.68
Turnout				
Conservative hold		Swing		
Conservative hold		Swing		

=== Ingthorpe ===
Ingthorpe (2)
Party	Candidate	Votes	%	±%
Conservative	Tim Cox	1,025	24.11	+6.76
Labour	Kath Robson	1,007	23.68	−7.00
Conservative	Jill Ratcliffe	966	22.72	+6.59
Labour	Roy Lewis	928	21.82	−4.48
Liberal Democrats	Linda Bate	326	7.67	−1.88
Turnout			43.9	−2.8
Conservative gain from Labour		Swing	+13.8	
Labour hold		Swing	-13.6	

=== Layton ===
Layton (2)
Party	Candidate	Votes	%	±%
Conservative	Sue Ridyard	1,028	25.60	+12.60
Conservative	Roy Haskett	946	23.56	+11.18
Labour	Sue Wright	862	21.46	−8.01
Labour	Roy Fisher	860	21.41	−7.06
Liberal Democrats	Jack Smith	320	7.97	+1.28
Turnout				
Conservative gain from Labour		Swing		
Conservative gain from Labour		Swing		

=== Marton ===
Marton (2)
Party	Candidate	Votes	%	±%
Conservative	Nicola Best	1,264	26.25	−1.91
Conservative	Jim Houldsworth	1,262	26.21	−0.02
Labour	Jim Elmes	610	12.67	−8.31
Labour	David O'Hara	536	11.13	−6.61
Liberal Democrats	Hazel Williams	216	4.49	−2.38
Turnout				
Conservative hold		Swing		
Conservative hold		Swing		

=== Norbreck ===
Norbreck (2)
Party	Candidate	Votes	%	±%
Conservative	Maxine Callow	1,756	37.54	+5.29
Conservative	Peter Callow	1,719	36.75	+3.95
Labour	Alan Thomson	484	10.35	−4.86
Labour	Alun Priestley	442	9.45	−3.53
Liberal Democrats	Donna Bamborough	277	5.92	−0.84
Turnout				
Conservative hold		Swing		
Conservative hold		Swing		

=== Park ===
Park (2)
Party	Candidate	Votes	%	±%
Labour	Les Kersh	661	21.15	−5.76
Labour	Brian Doherty	631	20.19	−7.12
Conservative	Tim Rosser	536	17.15	+2.54
Conservative	Gill Clapham	517	16.54	+2.87
BNP	Les Joy	339	10.84	+10.84
Liberal Democrats	Susan Powell	276	8.83	−1.65
UKIP	John Bebbington	166	5.31	+5.31
Turnout				
Labour hold		Swing		
Labour hold		Swing		

=== Squires Gate ===
Squires Gate (2)
Party	Candidate	Votes	%	±%
Liberal Democrats	Robert Wynne	1,317	30.15	+3.04
Liberal Democrats	Douglas Green	1,223	28.00	+5.79
Conservative	Geoffrey Price	638	14.61	−0.60
Conservative	Roger Jones	608	13.92	+0.95
Labour	David Menon	318	7.28	−5.13
Labour	James Sorah	264	6.04	−4.05
Turnout				
Liberal Democrats hold		Swing		
Liberal Democrats hold		Swing		

=== Stanley ===
Stanley (2)
Party	Candidate	Votes	%	±%
Conservative	Peter Evans	1,401	33.90	+10.29
Conservative	Granville Heap	1,307	31.62	+9.70
Labour	Gillian Tomlinson	595	14.40	−0.12
Labour	Amy Cross	527	12.75	+1.67
Liberal Democrats	David Stevenson	303	7.33	−5.59
Turnout				
Conservative hold		Swing		
Conservative hold		Swing		

=== Talbot ===
Talbot (2)
Party	Candidate	Votes	%	±%
Conservative	Gary Bell	779	25.59	+9.01
Conservative	Ron Bell	759	24.93	+9.03
Labour	Eric Allcock	632	20.76	−3.06
Labour	John Boughton	601	19.74	−2.47
Liberal Democrats	Peter Wood	273	8.97	−2.47
Turnout				
Conservative gain from Labour		Swing		
Conservative gain from Labour		Swing		

=== Tyldesley ===
Tyldesley (2)
Party	Candidate	Votes	%	±%
Conservative	Jim Price	833	23.90	+5.46
Conservative	Roger Stansfield	802	23.01	+7.36
Labour	Allan Matthews	775	22.23	−7.11
Labour	Edward Collett	749	21.49	−5.88
Liberal Democrats	Rod Holt	327	9.38	+0.18
Turnout				
Conservative gain from Labour		Swing		
Conservative gain from Labour		Swing		

=== Victoria ===
Victoria (2)
Party	Candidate	Votes	%	±%
Labour	Fred Jackson	783	26.44	+2.28
Labour	David Owen	660	22.29	+0.37
Conservative	Sam Bell	528	17.83	+5.777
Conservative	Bryan Horne	523	17.66	+6.20
Liberal Democrats	Ian Coleman	467	15.77	−0.31
Turnout				
Labour hold		Swing		
Labour hold		Swing		

=== Warbreck ===
Warbreck (2)
Party	Candidate	Votes	%	±%
Conservative	Joyce Delves	1,084	26.90	+2.52
Conservative	Tony Brown	1,057	26.23	+2.84
Labour	Maureen Horn	453	11.24	−5.84
Labour	Stephen Perry	417	10.35	−6.03
Liberal Democrats	Anne Heyworth	359	8.91	−0.70
Liberal Democrats	Kevan Benfold	347	8.61	−0.46
BNP	Alan Kelly	313	7.77	+7.77
Turnout				
Conservative hold		Swing		
Conservative hold		Swing		

=== Waterloo ===
Waterloo (2)
Party	Candidate	Votes	%	±%
Conservative	Ian Fowler	972	27.43	+6.71
Conservative	Tony Lee	940	26.52	+8.46
Labour	Carol Radcliffe	730	20.60	+0.20
Labour	Paul Wainwright	605	17.07	−0.82
Liberal Democrats	Susan Moss	297	8.38	−3.56
Turnout				
Conservative hold		Swing		
Conservative gain from Labour		Swing		
