= 2015 Blackpool Borough Council election =

Local election in Blackpool, England

The 2015 Blackpool Borough Council election took place on 7 May 2015 to elect members of Blackpool Borough Council in England. All 21 wards of 2 seats each on the council were contested with newly elected members next due to serve a four-year term and next contest their seats in 2019. This election took place on the same day as other local elections as well as the 2015 UK General Election.

The Labour Party retained an overall control on the council, winning 29 of the 42 seats on the council. The Conservative Party won the remaining 13 seats, wiping out the Liberal Democrats.

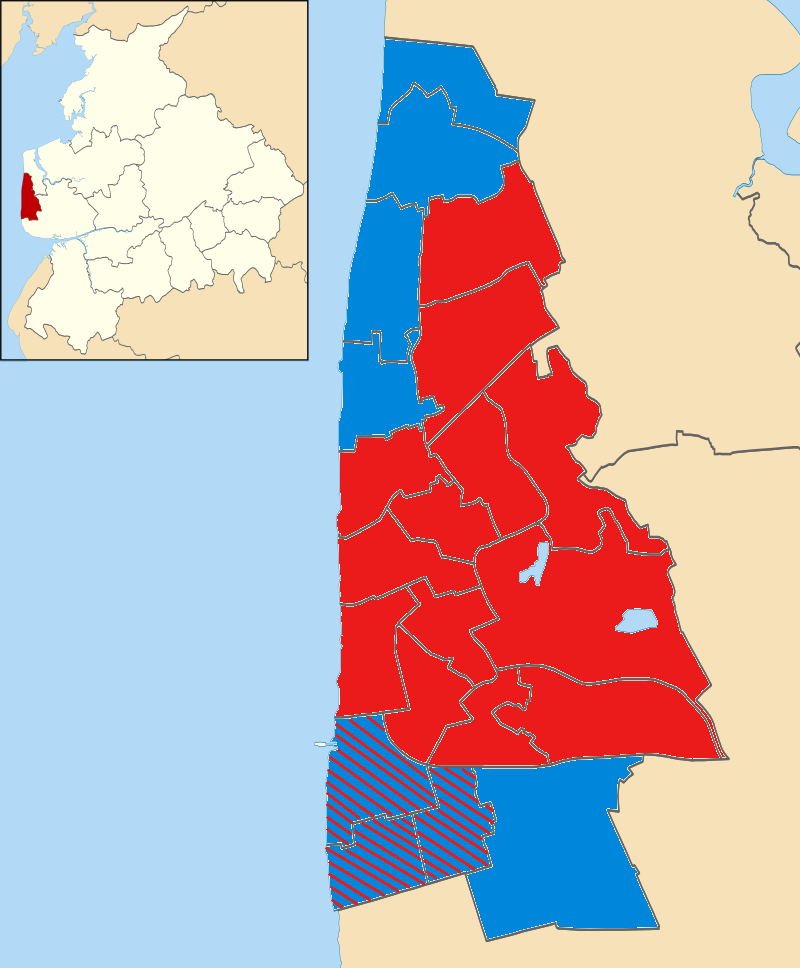
Map of Blackpool showing the results of the 2015 local election

== Result ==
Blackpool Borough Council Election Result 2015
Party	Seats	Gains	Losses	Net gain/loss	Seats %	Votes %	Votes	+/−
Labour	29	2	0	+2	69.0	43.6	46,672	-6.6%
Conservative	13	0	1	-1	31.0	39.1	41,904	-2.3%
UKIP	0	0	0	0	0	13.7	14,703	+11.7%
Liberal Democrats	0	0	1	-1	0	1.6	1,750	-3.6%
Green	0	0	0	0	0	1.5	1,606	+1.4%
Independent	0	0	0	0	0	0.3	269	-0.9%
TUSC	0	0	0	0	0	0.2	193	N/A

A total of 107,097 votes were cast, with 345 ballots being spoilt. The turnout was 58.1%.

== Council Composition ==
Prior to the election the composition of the council was:

↓
27	14	1
Labour	Conservative	Lib Dem

After the election, the composition of the council was:

↓
29	13
Labour	Conservative

Lib Dem - Liberal Democrats

== Ward results ==
Asterisks denote incumbent Councillors seeking re-election. All results are listed below:

=== Anchorsholme ===
Anchorsholme (2 Seats)
Party	Candidate	Votes	%	±%
Conservative	Paul David Stuart Galley*	1,879	52.6	
Conservative	Tony Williams*	1,620		
Labour	John Bamborough	1,054	29.5	
Labour	Jane Hugo	1,048		
UKIP	Jaqueline Georgina Margaret Sidwell	637	17.8	
Majority				
Turnout		6,238	67.2	+19.5
Conservative hold		Swing		
Conservative hold		Swing		

=== Bispham ===
Bispham (2 Seats)
Party	Candidate	Votes	%	±%
Conservative	Don Clapham*	1,559	41.1	
Conservative	Colin Alan Maycock	1,144		
Labour	John Hawkins-Arkwright	1,121	29.6	
Labour	Nita Doreen	839		
UKIP	Sandra Patricia Braithwaite	787	20.8	N/A
Green	Gordon Stuart Anthony Sinclair	325	8.6	N/A
Majority				
Turnout		5,775	66.0	24.3
Conservative hold		Swing		
Conservative hold		Swing		

=== Bloomfield ===
Bloomfield (2 Seats)
Party	Candidate	Votes	%	±%
Labour	Graham Cain*	1,045	44.8	
Labour	John Jones	902		
UKIP	Liam James Jan Bleeker	585	25.1	
Conservative	Mandy Louise Cunliffe	463	19.9	
Conservative	Annemarie Slack	294		
Green	Phil Armstrong	202	8.7	N/A
Independent	Olga Helena Krzyzaniak	37	1.6	N/A
Majority		317	8.99	
Turnout		3,528	45.4	+18.9
Labour hold		Swing		
Labour hold		Swing		

=== Brunswick ===
Brunswick (2 Seats)
Party	Candidate	Votes	%	±%
Labour	Gary Ian Coleman*	1,187	51.5	
Labour	Simon Howard Blackburn*	1,181		
Conservative	Joey Blower	642	27.9	
Conservative	Shirley Margaret Tracy Anne Cantrell	626		
UKIP	Colin Porter	432	18.8	
UKIP	Joanna Jones Trafford	358		
Independent	Marek Marian Radomski	42	1.8	N/A
Turnout		4,468	51.9	+18.1
Labour hold		Swing		
Labour hold		Swing		

=== Claremont ===
Claremont (2 Seats)
Party	Candidate	Votes	%	±%
Labour	Ivan John Taylor*	1,276	45.4	
Labour	Lynne Suzanne Williams	1,035		
Conservative	Geraldine Anne Brown	584	20.8	
Conservative	Fred Winston Barnes	563		
UKIP	Alex Ewan	519	18.5	N/A
Green	Gary Michael Richardson	215	7.7	N/A
Liberal Democrats	Sue Close	168	6.0	
Independent	Jaguar Man	46	1.6	
Turnout		4,406	48.8	+20.5
Labour hold		Swing		
Labour hold		Swing		

=== Clifton ===
Clifton (2 Seats)
Party	Candidate	Votes	%	±%
Labour	Adrian Leonard Hutton	1,315	28.62	+0.71
Labour	Luke Taylor	1,074	23.37	−10.02
UKIP	John Edward Braithwaite	823	17.91	N/A
Conservative	Bev Ramsden	732	15.93	−1.44
Conservative	Phil Ramsden	651	14.17	−0.38
Majority		251	5.46	
Turnout		4,595	54.12	+19.22
Labour hold		Swing		
Labour hold		Swing		

=== Greenlands ===
Greenlands (2 Seats)
Party	Candidate	Votes	%	±%
Labour	Chris Ryan*	1,280	23.91	+2.51
Labour	Christine Elizabeth Wright*	1,191	22.25	+0.65
Conservative	Angela Immacolata Brown	1,129	21.09	+2.09
Conservative	Vince McNulty	1,061	19.82	−0.68
UKIP	Danny Fox	692	12.93	+6.43
Majority		62	1.16	
Turnout		5,353	60.89	+20.49
Labour hold		Swing		
Labour hold		Swing		

=== Hawes Side ===
Hawes Side (2 Seats)
Party	Candidate	Votes	%	±%
Labour	Debbie Coleman	1,287	25.62	−8.98
Labour	Kim Elizabeth Critchley	1,204	23.97	−8.73
Conservative	Vicky Cunningham	713	14.19	−2.91
Conservative	Andy Miller	686	13.66	−0.74
UKIP	Debbie Jane Brailsford	610	12.14	N/A
UKIP	Barry Anthony Wells	523	10.41	N/A
Majority		491	9.78	
Turnout		5,023	52.43	+17.03
Labour hold		Swing		
Labour hold		Swing		

=== Highfield ===
Highfield (2 Seats)
Party	Candidate	Votes	%	±%
Labour	Peter Hunter	1,374	24.53	+1.23
Conservative	Lily Henderson	1,233	22.01	−1.89
Conservative	Graham James Baker	1,150	20.53	−0.87
Labour	James John Sorah	1,110	19.81	+0.51
UKIP	Lee David White	735	13.12	N/A
Majority		83	1.48	
Turnout		5,353	61.54	22.94
Labour hold		Swing		
Conservative hold		Swing		

=== Ingthorpe ===
Ingthorpe (2 Seats)
Party	Candidate	Votes	%	±%
Labour	Kath Rowson*	1,438	25.11	−1.83
Labour	Amy Louise Cross*	1,363	24.42	−0.28
Conservative	Michael Dillon	1,236	22.15	+6.75
Conservative	Matthew John Morris	869	15.57	+0.17
UKIP	Susan Howlett	675	12.09	N/A
Majority		127	2.27	
Turnout		5,581	62.83	+20.43
Labour hold		Swing		
Labour hold		Swing		

=== Layton ===
Layton (2 Seats)
Party	Candidate	Votes	%	±%
Labour	Kathryn Mary Benson	1,218	25.57	−3.13
Labour	Martin Mitchell*	998	20.95	−3.25
Conservative	John Ridyard	966	20.28	+1.72
Conservative	Sue Ridyard	931	19.54	−1.96
UKIP	Steve Werry	561	11.78	N/A
TUSC	Philip Watt	90	1.89	N/A
Majority		32	0.67	
Turnout		4,764	57.50	+18.50
Labour hold		Swing		
Labour hold		Swing		

=== Marton ===
Marton (2 Seats)
Party	Candidate	Votes	%	±%
Labour	Jim Elmes	1,422	25.22	+1.22
Labour	Vikki Irene Singleton	1,166	20.68	−4.72
Conservative	Roger Stansfield	1,136	20.15	−5.55
Conservative	Duncan James Stirling Whitehead	1,101	19.53	−1.47
UKIP	Paul Michael Nield	813	14.42	N/A
Majority		30	0.53	
Turnout		5,638	61.52	+22.82
Labour gain from Conservative		Swing		
Labour hold		Swing		

Cllr Elmes previously stood as a candidate in 2011 but was not elected.

=== Norbeck ===
Norbeck (2 Seats)
Party	Candidate	Votes	%	±%
Conservative	Maxine Callow*	1,866	28.81	−2.69
Conservative	Peter Callow*	1,839	28.39	−3.11
Labour	Neil Timothy Brookes	1,089	16.81	−2.19
Labour	Rex George Langford	985	15.21	−2.79
UKIP	Catherine Grimbilakos	699	10.79	N/A
Majority		750	11.58	
Turnout		6,478	68.97	+20.97
Conservative hold		Swing		
Conservative hold		Swing		

=== Park ===
Park (2 Seats)
Party	Candidate	Votes	%	±%
Labour	Gillian Campbell*	1,485	29.58	−0.72
Labour	Maria Lilian Kirkland	1,258	25.05	−5.25
Conservative	Brian Lawrence Coope	932	18.56	−3.34
Conservative	Karen Coope	794	15.81	−1.79
UKIP	John Hilston Bebbington	552	10.99	N/A
Majority		326	6.49	
Turnout		5,021	55.11	+17.81
Labour hold		Swing		
Labour hold		Swing		

=== Squires Gate ===
Squires Gate (2 Seats)
Party	Candidate	Votes	%	±%
Conservative	Christian John Cox*	1,279	24.15	+3.05
Labour	Alistair James Duncan Humphreys	804	15.18	−1.22
Conservative	Gerard John Sean Walsh	802	15.15	−1.65
Labour	Ben Singleton	775	14.64	−1.36
UKIP	Paul Martin White	668	12.62	N/A
Liberal Democrats	Douglas Henry Green*	608	11.48	−6.42
Liberal Democrats	Bill Greene	359	6.78	−5.02
Majority		2	0.03	
Turnout		5,295	63.32	+23.02
Conservative hold		Swing		
Labour gain from Liberal Democrats		Swing		

=== Stanley ===
Stanley (2 Seats)
Party	Candidate	Votes	%	±%
Conservative	Jason Roberts	1,468	26.11	+1.51
Conservative	Andrew Charles Stansfield*	1,355	24.10	+1.90
Labour	Pamela Ann Jackson	1,026	18.25	−3.25
Labour	Robert Wood	806	14.34	−5.46
UKIP	Martin Bleeker	756	13.45	+8.25
Liberal Democrats	Irene Greene	211	3.75	+1.75
Majority		329	5.85	
Turnout		5,622	63.40	+20.00
Conservative hold		Swing		
Conservative hold		Swing		

=== Talbot ===
Talbot (2 Seats)
Party	Candidate	Votes	%	±%
Labour	Ian Coleman	1,145	26.67	−2.33
Labour	Mark Peter Smith*	981	22.85	−4.95
Conservative	Charlie Docherty	796	18.54	−4.16
Conservative	Billy Coughlin	756	17.61	−2.11
UKIP	Jordan Braithwaite	512	11.93	N/A
TUSC	Stephen Troy	103	2.40	N/A
Majority		185	4.31	
Turnout		4,293	50.88	+20.98
Labour hold		Swing		
Labour hold		Swing		

=== Tyldesley ===
Tyldesley (2 Seats)
Party	Candidate	Votes	%	±%
Labour	Edward George Collett*	1,145	23.50	+8.10
Labour	Allan Mathews*	1,145	23.50	+7.20
Conservative	Moira Stephanie Graham	872	17.90	−1.20
Conservative	Adam Philip McCance	741	15.21	−3.29
UKIP	Kim Sherrie Knight	658	13.51	N/A
Liberal Democrats	Paul Richard Hindley	167	3.43	N/A
Independent	Mark Earnest Tugwood	144	2.96	N/A
Majority		273	5.60	
Turnout		4,872	55.40	+19.80
Labour hold		Swing		
Labour hold		Swing		

=== Victoria ===
Victoria (2 Seats)
Party	Candidate	Votes	%	±%
Labour	Fred Jackson*	1,209	27.74	−9.36
Labour	David Owen*	966	22.16	−10.94
UKIP	Terry Knight	735	16.86	+1.06
Conservative	Mark Courtney Massey	636	14.59	+0.59
Conservative	Tony Jones	539	12.37	N/A
Green	Gina Eastwood	274	6.29	N/A
Majority		231	5.30	
Turnout		4,359	51.65	+17.95
Labour hold		Swing		
Labour hold		Swing		

=== Warbeck ===
Warbeck (2 Seats)
Party	Candidate	Votes	%	±%
Conservative	Tony Brown*	1,237	22.94	−2.66
Conservative	Danny Scott	1,197	22.20	−2.70
Labour	David Collett	962	17.84	+0.84
Labour	Matthew Haynes	876	16.25	+0.35
UKIP	Warwick Charles Stockman Howlett	633	11.74	+6.64
Green	Kathryn Sinclair	250	4.64	+1.54
Liberal Democrats	Kevin Michael Benfold	237	4.40	−0.7
Majority		235	4.36	
Turnout		5,392	62.98	+25.58
Conservative hold		Swing		
Conservative hold		Swing		

=== Waterloo ===
Waterloo (2 Seats)
Party	Candidate	Votes	%	±%
Conservative	Derek Robertson	1,043	21.76	−1.74
Labour	David O'Hara*	966	20.15	−7.55
Labour	Heather O'Hara	921	19.21	−0.29
Conservative	Barry Leslie Vernon	784	16.35	−5.15
UKIP	Spencer David Shackleton	740	15.44	N/A
Green	June Irene Daniels	340	7.09	N/A
Majority		45	0.94	
Turnout		4,794	58.90	+24.30
Conservative hold		Swing		
Labour hold		Swing		
