= Lancashire =

County of England

- Non-metropolitan and ceremonial county
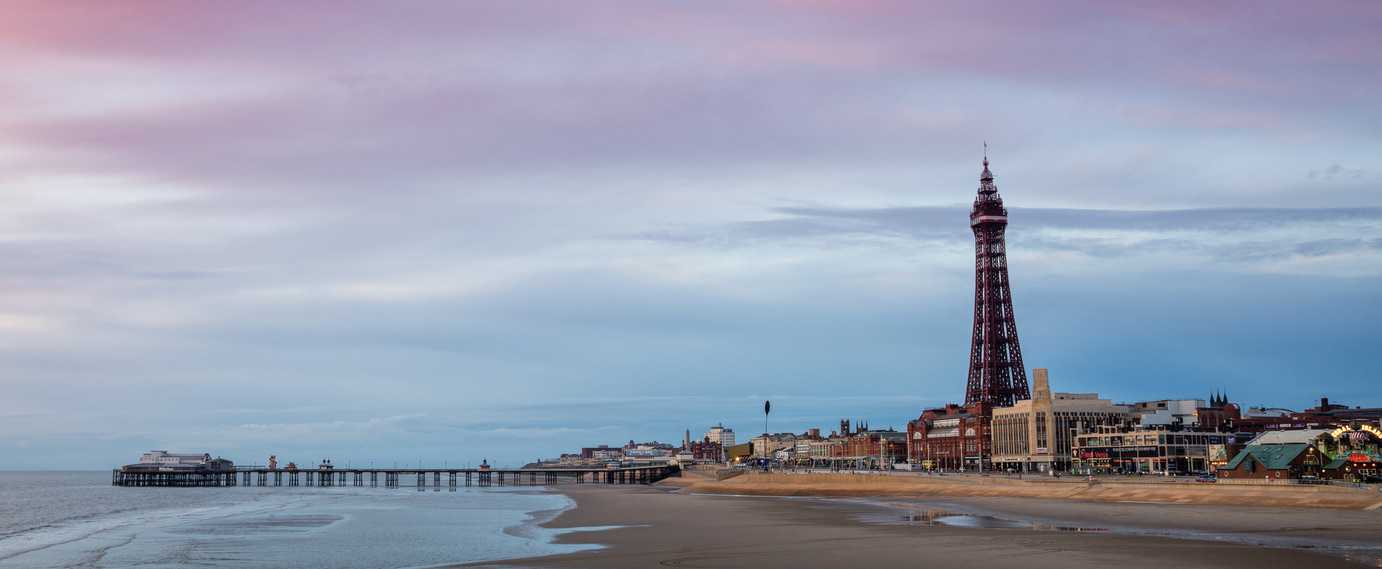
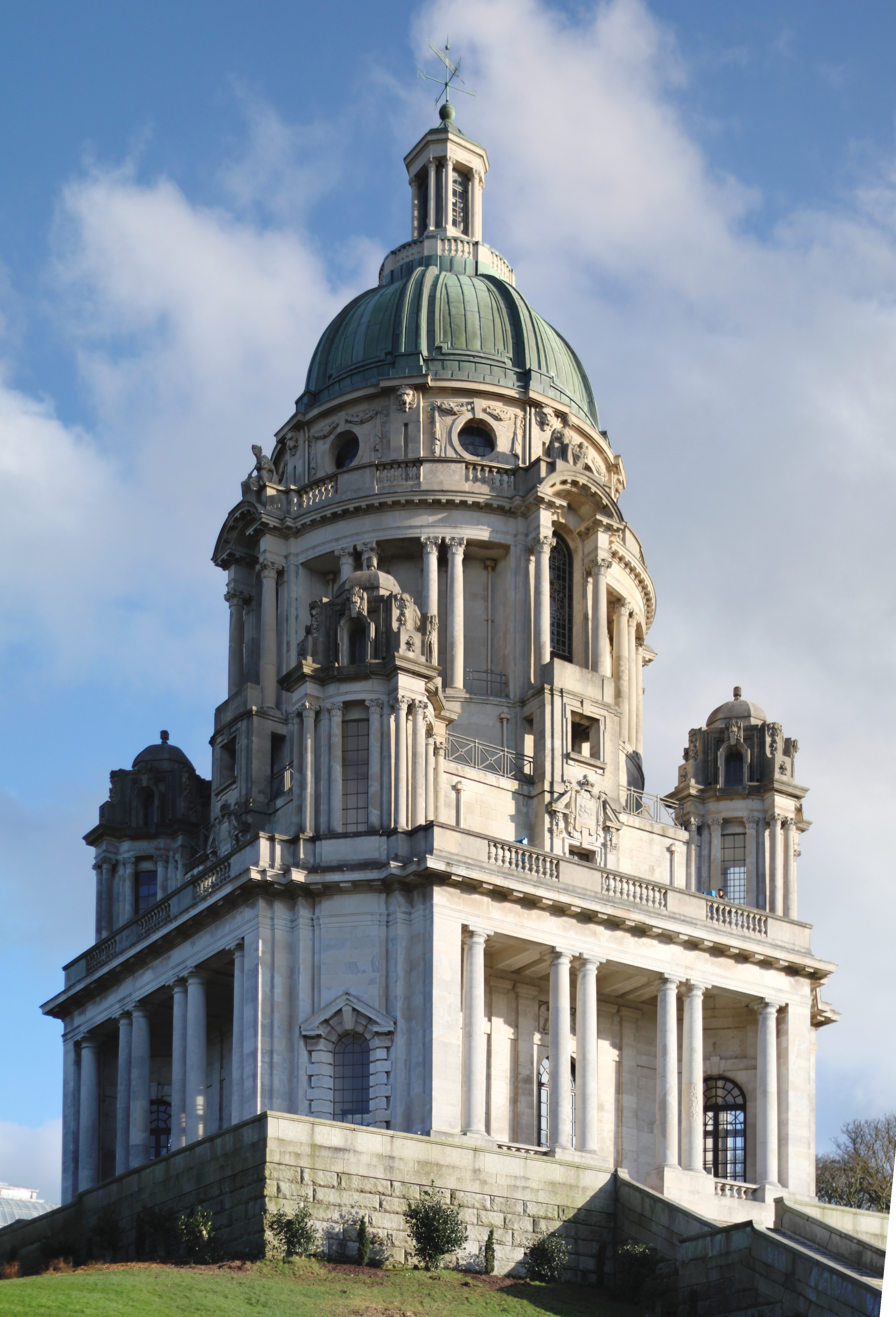
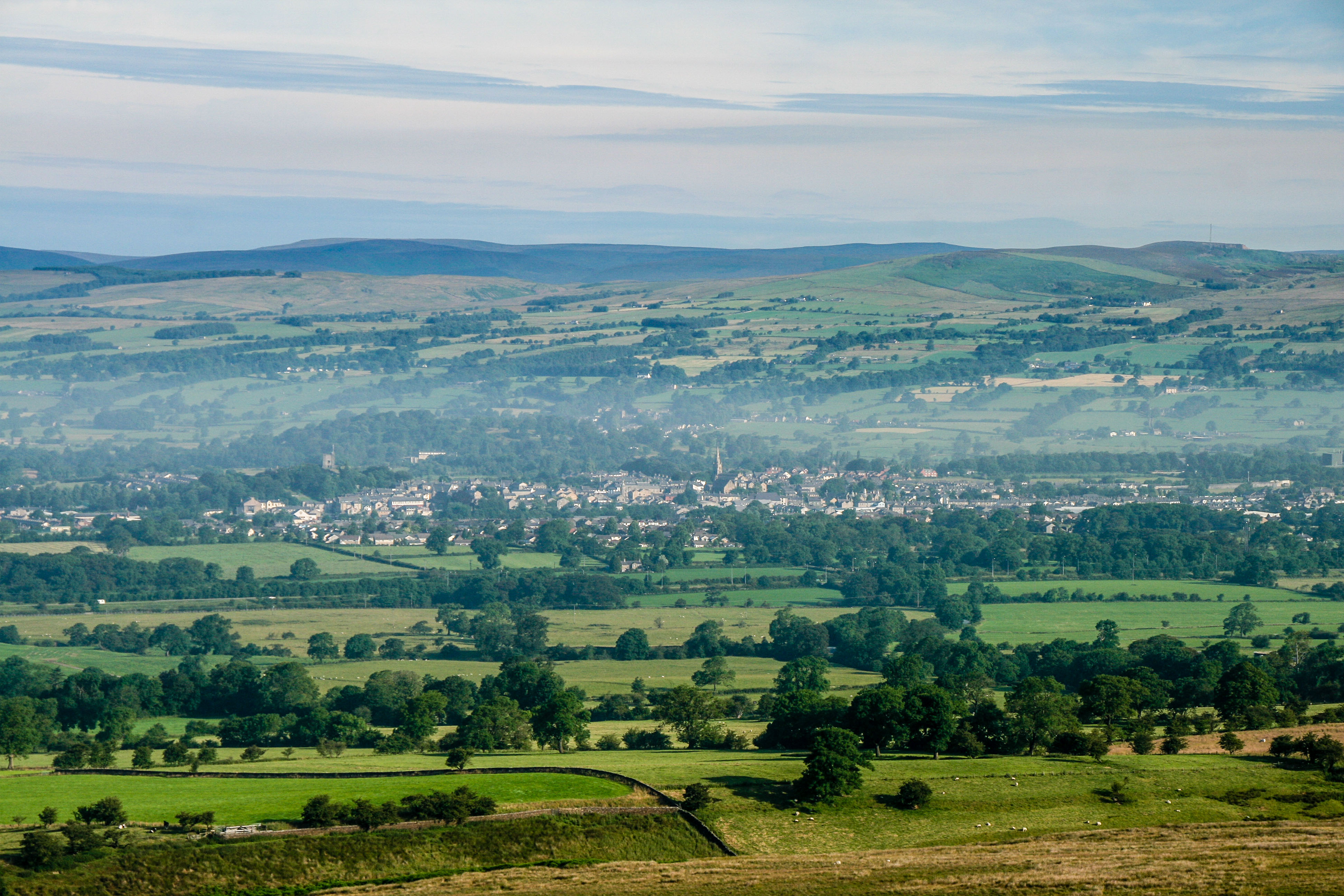
- Central Pier and the Tower, Blackpool; the Ashton Memorial, Lancaster; and a view of Clitheroe with the Forest of Bowland beyond

- Ceremonial Lancashire within England Historic Lancashire within England
- Coordinates: 53.8°N 2.6°W
- Sovereign state: United Kingdom
- Constituent country: England
- Region: North West England
- Established: c. 1182
- Origin: Honour of Lancaster
- Time zone: UTC+0 (GMT)
  - Summer (DST): UTC+1 (BST)
- UK Parliament: 16 MPs
- Police: Lancashire Constabulary
- Largest city: Preston
- Ceremonial county
- Lord Lieutenant: Amanda Parker
- High Sheriff: David Collinge
- Area: 3,066 km^{2} (1,184 sq mi)
  - Rank: 17th of 48
- Population (2024): 1,601,645
  - Rank: 8th of 48
  - Density: 522/km^{2} (1,350/sq mi)
- Non-metropolitan county
- County council: Lancashire County Council
- Control: Reform UK
- Admin HQ: Preston
- Area: 2,894 km^{2} (1,117 sq mi)
  - Rank: 9th of 21
- Population (2025): 1,308,567
  - Rank: 4th of 21
  - Density: 452/km^{2} (1,170/sq mi)
- ISO 3166-2: GB-LAN
- GSS code: E10000017
- ITL: TLD43
- Website: lancashire.gov.uk
- Unitary authorities
- Councils: Blackpool Council; Blackburn with Darwen Borough Council
- Districts
- Districts of Lancashire; Unitary County council area
- Districts: List: Lancaster; Wyre; Blackpool; Fylde; Preston; Ribble Valley; South Ribble; Hyndburn; Burnley; Pendle; West Lancashire; Chorley; Blackburn with Darwen; Rossendale

Lancashire (/ˈlæŋkəʃər/ LANG-kə-shər, /-ʃɪər/ -sheer; abbreviated Lancs) is a ceremonial county in North West England. It is bordered by Cumbria to the north, North Yorkshire and West Yorkshire to the east, Greater Manchester and Merseyside to the south, and the Irish Sea to the west. The largest settlement is the city of Preston.

The county has an area of 3,079 square kilometres (1,189 sq mi) and had an estimated population of 1,601,645 in 2024. Preston and Blackburn are near the centre of the county, Burnley is in the east, the seaside resort of Blackpool on the coast in the west, and the city of Lancaster in the north. For local government purposes the county comprises a non-metropolitan county, with twelve districts, and two unitary authority areas: Blackburn with Darwen and Blackpool. Lancashire County Council and the two unitary councils collaborate through the Lancashire Combined County Authority. The county historically included the Furness and Cartmel peninsulas of Cumbria, northern Greater Manchester and Merseyside, and Warrington, but excluded the eastern part of the Forest of Bowland.

The west of Lancashire contains flat coastal plains: the West Lancashire coastal plain to the south and the Fylde in the centre. The north-western coast is hilly and contains part of Arnside and Silverdale, a national landscape. The east of the county is upland, with the West Pennine Moors in the south-east and the Forest of Bowland in the north-east; Bowland has also been designated a national landscape. The major rivers of the county are, from north to south, the Lune, the Wyre, and the Ribble, which all flow west into the Irish Sea. The highest point in Lancashire is either Gragareth or Green Hill, both approximately 628 m (2,060 ft) high and located in the far north-east of the county.

Lancashire was founded in the 12th century; in the Domesday Book of 1086 much of what would become the county is treated as part of Yorkshire and Cheshire. Until the Early Modern period the county was a comparatively poor backwater, although in 1351 it became a palatine, with a semi-independent judicial system. This changed during the Industrial Revolution, when the county rapidly industrialised; until 1974 it included both Liverpool, a major port, and Manchester, which with its surrounding towns dominated the manufacture of textiles. The Lancashire coalfield was also exploited, with many collieries opening. By 1971 Lancashire had a population of 5,118,405, which made it the most heavily populated county in the United Kingdom after Greater London.

== History ==
=== Before the county ===
During Roman times, the area was part of the Brigantes tribal area in the military zone of Roman Britain. The towns of Manchester, Lancaster, Ribchester, Burrow, Elslack and Castleshaw grew around Roman forts. In the centuries after the Roman withdrawal in 410 AD the northern parts of the county probably formed part of the Brythonic kingdom of Rheged, a successor entity to the Brigantes tribe. During the mid-8th century, the area was incorporated into the Anglo-Saxon Kingdom of Northumbria from the north of the River Ribble and the Kingdom of Mercia from the south, which both became parts of England in the 10th century.

In the Domesday Book, land between the Ribble and Mersey were known as Inter Ripam et Mersam and included in the returns for Cheshire. Although some historians consider this to mean south Lancashire was then part of Cheshire, it is by no means certain. (Note: Harris and Thacker (1987) write on page 252: "Certainly there were links between Cheshire and south Lancashire before 1000, when Wulfric Spot held lands in both territories. Wulfric's estates remained grouped together after his death, when they were left to his brother Aelfhelm. And indeed, there still seems to have been some kind of connexion in 1086, when south Lancashire was surveyed together with Cheshire by the Domesday commissioners. Nevertheless, the two territories do seem to have been distinguished from one another in some way and it is not certain that the shire-moot and the reeves referred to in the south Lancashire section of Domesday were the Cheshire ones.") (Note: Crosby, A. (1996) writes on page 31: "The Domesday Survey (1086) included south Lancashire with Cheshire for convenience, but the Mersey, the name of which means 'boundary river' is known to have divided the kingdoms of Northumbria and Mercia and there is no doubt that this was the real boundary.") It is also claimed that the territory to the north formed part of the West Riding of Yorkshire.

=== Early history ===
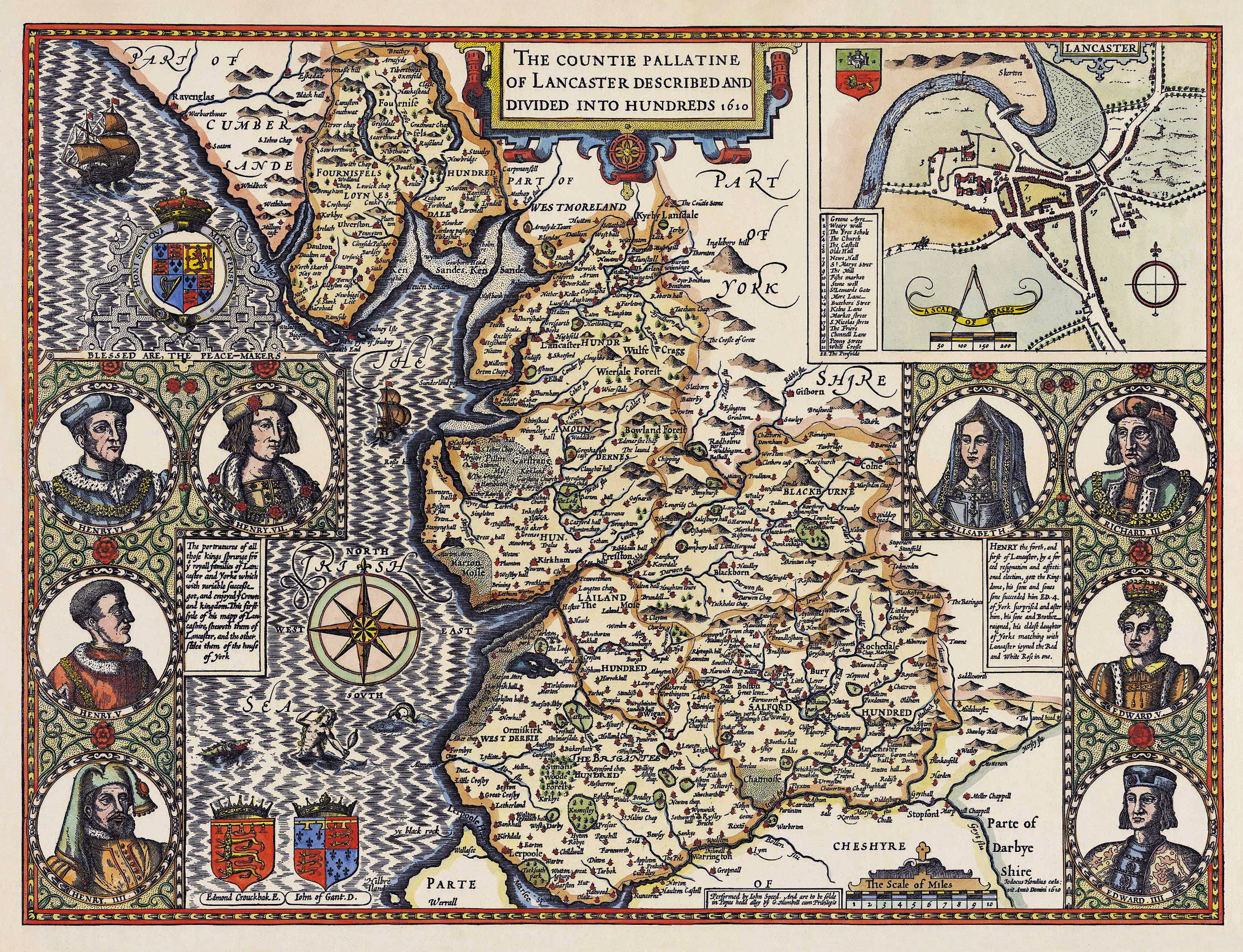
Map of the countie pallatine of Lancaster, 1610 by John Speed

The county was established in 1182, and came to be bordered by Cumberland, Westmorland, Yorkshire, and Cheshire. It was divided into the hundreds of Amounderness, Blackburn, Leyland, Lonsdale, Salford and West Derby. Lonsdale was further partitioned into Lonsdale North, the detached part north of the sands of Morecambe Bay including Furness and Cartmel, and Lonsdale South.

=== Industrial revolution ===
Lancashire was one of the homes of modern industrialisation, particularly in textile manufacturing. This started with small scale experiments, for example in the automation of weaving. Lancashire had a long history of supplying wool to skilled weavers in Europe and southern England, as well as having many cottager weavers itself by the 18th century. But the advent of increased imports of cotton needing processing was a trigger to innovation. John Kay, Richard Arkwright, Samuel Crompton, and James Hargreaves were from Lancashire.

Historically there had been few boroughs in the county, but as the county became more populous, 22 Lancashire towns were incoporated as municipal boroughs up to 1862. In 1889, the administrative county of Lancashire was created, covering the greater part of the county, with administratively-independent county boroughs for the now large towns of Barrow-in-Furness, Blackburn, Bolton, Bootle, Burnley, Bury, Liverpool, Manchester, Oldham, Preston, Rochdale, Salford, St. Helens, and Wigan.

=== 20th century ===
During the 20th century, the county became increasingly urban. The administrative county was the most populous of its type outside London, with a population of 2,280,359 in 1961. By the census of 1971, the population of Lancashire and its county boroughs had reached 5,129,416, making it the most populous geographic county in the UK.

In 1974, local government throughout Lancashire was reorganised. Areas in the south-east of the county were included in the new metropolitan county of Greater Manchester, while areas in the south-west were included in Merseyside. Widnes and Warrington became part of Cheshire, while the Furness area in the north became part of the new county of Cumbria. The remainder of Lancashire was reconstituted as a non-metropolitan county with 14 districts, which included some areas from the West Riding of Yorkshire, namely Barnoldswick and Earby, Bowland Rural District, and the parishes of Bracewell and Brogden and Salterforth.

In 1994, the parish of Simonswood was transferred from the borough of Knowsley in Merseyside to the district of West Lancashire. In 1998, Blackpool and Blackburn with Darwen became unitary authorities, removing them from the non-metropolitan county but not from the ceremonial county.

== Geography ==
=== Geology, landscape, and ecology ===
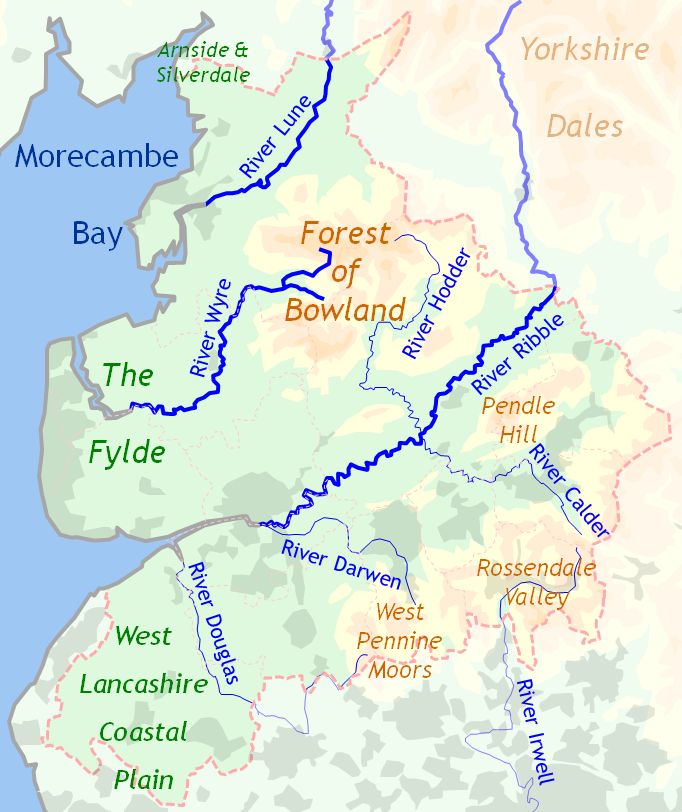
Topography of Lancashire

The three main rivers of Lancashire are, from north to south, the Lune, the Wyre, and the Ribble, which all flow west into the Irish Sea. The Lune rises in Cumbria, before entering Lancashire and flowing through Lancaster. The Wyre rises in Bowland and flows west then south, turning west again across the Fylde and then north as it broadens into its estuary west of Fleetwood. The Ribble rises in North Yorkshire, and flows south-west through Lancashire past Clitheroe and Preston before broadening into the Ribble Estuary. Many of Lancashire's other rivers are tributaries of the Ribble, including the Calder, Darwen, Douglas, and Hodder. The Irwell, which flows through Manchester, has its source in Lancashire.

To the west of the county are the Fylde coastal plain and West Lancashire coastal plain, which lie north and south of the Ribble Estuary respectively. Apart from the coastal resorts these areas are largely rural and devoted to vegetable crops. Further north is Morecambe Bay. In the northwest corner of the county, straddling the border with Cumbria, is the Arnside and Silverdale National Landscape, characterised by its limestone pavements and home to the Leighton Moss nature reserve.

In the east of the county are upland areas leading to the Pennines. North of the Ribble are Beacon Fell Country Park and the Forest of Bowland, another National Landscape. Much of the lowland in this area is devoted to dairy farming and cheesemaking, whereas the higher ground is more suitable for sheep, and the highest ground is uncultivated moorland. The valleys of the River Ribble and its tributary the Calder form a large gap to the west of the Pennines, overlooked by Pendle Hill. South of the Ribble are the West Pennine Moors and the Forest of Rossendale, where former cotton mill towns are in deep valleys. The Lancashire Coalfield, largely in modern-day Greater Manchester, extended into Merseyside and to Ormskirk, Chorley, Burnley and Colne in Lancashire.

The highest point of the ceremonial county is Gragareth, near Whernside, which reaches a height of 627 m (2,057 ft). Green Hill near Gragareth has also been cited as the "county" top. The highest point in the historic county is Coniston Old Man in the Lake District, at 803 m (2,634 ft).

=== Human geography ===
The North West Green Belt Ceremonial county borders District council borders

The north of the ceremonial county is less densely populated than the south, especially inland. The Fylde coast is continuously built-up from Lytham St Annes to Fleetwood, including Blackpool, and further north Lancaster, Morecambe, and Heysham form a conurbation. The rest of the region is characterised by small towns and villages in the flat farmland surrounding the lower reaches of the Ribble, Wyre, and Lune and the sparsely populated uplands of the Forest of Bowland.

The centre and south-east of Lancashire are relatively urbanised, especially around the major settlements of Preston, Blackburn, and Burnley and near the border with Greater Manchester. The Central Lancashire urban area includes the city of Preston and the towns of Penwortham, Leyland and Chorley. A short distance east, Blackburn and Darwen are the first of several adjacent urban areas which continue east toward West Yorkshire and south into the valleys leading to Greater Manchester, the others being Accrington and Rossendale and Burnley. West Lancashire in the south-west is rural with the exception of Skelmersdale, which forms part of Wigan urban area.

The North West Green Belt covers a large part of the south and centre of the county to prevent the settlements there from converging both with each other and with the nearby Merseyside and Greater Manchester conurbations. It includes all of the non-urban areas in the boroughs of West Lancashire and South Ribble and the majority of Chorley; elsewhere it is less extensive, but covers the areas between the major settlements. There is a further area of green belt in the north of the county between Lancaster, Morecambe, and Carnforth.

The cities of Manchester, Salford, Liverpool and the following settlements within the historic county boundaries are currently in the ceremonial counties of West Yorkshire, Cheshire, Merseyside, Greater Manchester and Cumbria:

To ceremonial	From historic Lancashire
Greater Manchester	Abram; Ashton-in-Makerfield; Ashton-under-Lyne; Aspull; Astley; Atherton; Audenshaw; Blackrod; Bolton; Boothstown; Bury; Cadishead; Chadderton; Clifton; Denton; Droylsden; Eccles; Failsworth; Farnworth; Golborne; Haughton Green; Heatons; Heywood; Horwich; Hindley; Ince-in-Makerfield; Irlam; Kearsley; Lees; Leigh; Littleborough; Little Hulton; Little Lever; Lowton; Manchester; Middleton; Milnrow; Mosley Common; Mossley (part); Newhey; Oldham; Orrell; Pendlebury; Platt Bridge; Prestwich; Radcliffe; Ramsbottom; Reddish; Rochdale; Royton; Salford; Shaw and Crompton; Shevington; South Turton; Standish; Stalybridge (part); Stretford; Swinton; Tottington; Tyldesley; Urmston; Walkden; Westhoughton; Whitefield; Wigan; Worsley
Merseyside	Billinge; Bootle; Crosby; Earlestown; Eccleston; Formby; Halewood; Halsnead; Haydock; Huyton; Kirkby; Litherland; Liverpool; Maghull; Newton-le-Willows; Prescot; Rainford; Rainhill; Seaforth; St. Helens; Southport; Stockbridge Village; Waterloo; Whiston
Cumbria	Askam and Ireleth; Barrow-in-Furness; Broughton-in-Furness; Cartmel; Coniston; Dalton-in-Furness; Grange-over-Sands; Hawkshead; Ulverston; Walney Island
Cheshire	Culcheth; Birchwood; Warrington; Widnes
West Yorkshire	Todmorden (part)
From historic	To ceremonial Lancashire
West Riding of Yorkshire	Barnoldswick; Bolton-by-Bowland; Earby; Slaidburn

Boundary changes before 1974 include:

- Todmorden, split between Lancashire and Yorkshire then entirely to West Riding of Yorkshire in 1889
- Mossley, split between Lancashire, Yorkshire and Cheshire then entirely to Lancashire in 1889
- Stalybridge, entirely to Cheshire in 1889
- Areas such as Wythenshawe and Latchford, former county boroughs of Manchester and Warrington both extended south of the Mersey into historic Cheshire
- areas such as Reddish and the Heatons (Heaton Chapel, Heaton Mersey, Heaton Moor and Heaton Norris), former county borough of Stockport extended north into historic Lancashire.

== Governance ==
=== Local ===
For local government purposes Lancashire is divided into a non-metropolitan county, itself divided into twelve non-metropolitan districts, and two unitary authority areas.

The non-metropolitan county operates on a two-tier system, with local government functions divided between Lancashire County Council and the councils of the twelve districts. The county council is based in County Hall in Preston, and has 84 councillors. It has been controlled by Reform UK since the 2025 Lancashire County Council local election. The twelve districts are Burnley, Chorley, Fylde, Hyndburn, Lancaster, Pendle, Preston, Ribble Valley, Rossendale, South Ribble, West Lancashire, and Wyre.

Blackpool and Blackburn with Darwen are unitary authority areas, meaning their councils combine the functions of a district and county council. The two authorities have had majority Labour administrations since the 2023 Blackpool Council election and 2024 Blackburn with Darwen Borough Council election respectively.

The ceremonial county itself has only a minor administrative function, being the area to which the Lord Lieutenant of Lancashire is appointed; the shrieval county has the same boundaries and is the area to which the High Sheriff of Lancashire is appointed.

==== Future ====
In July 2026, the Government of the United Kingdom announced its intention to reorganise Lancashire into four unitary authority areas by April 2028. North Lancashire will combine Lancaster, Preston, and Ribble Valley; Pennine Lancashire will combine Blackburn with Darwen, Burnley, Hyndburn, Rossendale, and Pendle; South Lancashire will combine Chorley, South Ribble, and West Lancashire; and Fylde Coast will combine Blackpool, Fylde, and Wyre.

The reorganisation would replace the existing county, district and unitary councils with the four new authorities from 1 April 2028, subject to the necessary legislation. Elections to the new unitary authorities will be held in May 2027. The names of the proposed authorities remained under discussion following the government's announcement, with the existing councils unable to reach unanimous agreement on them in August 2026.

==== History ====
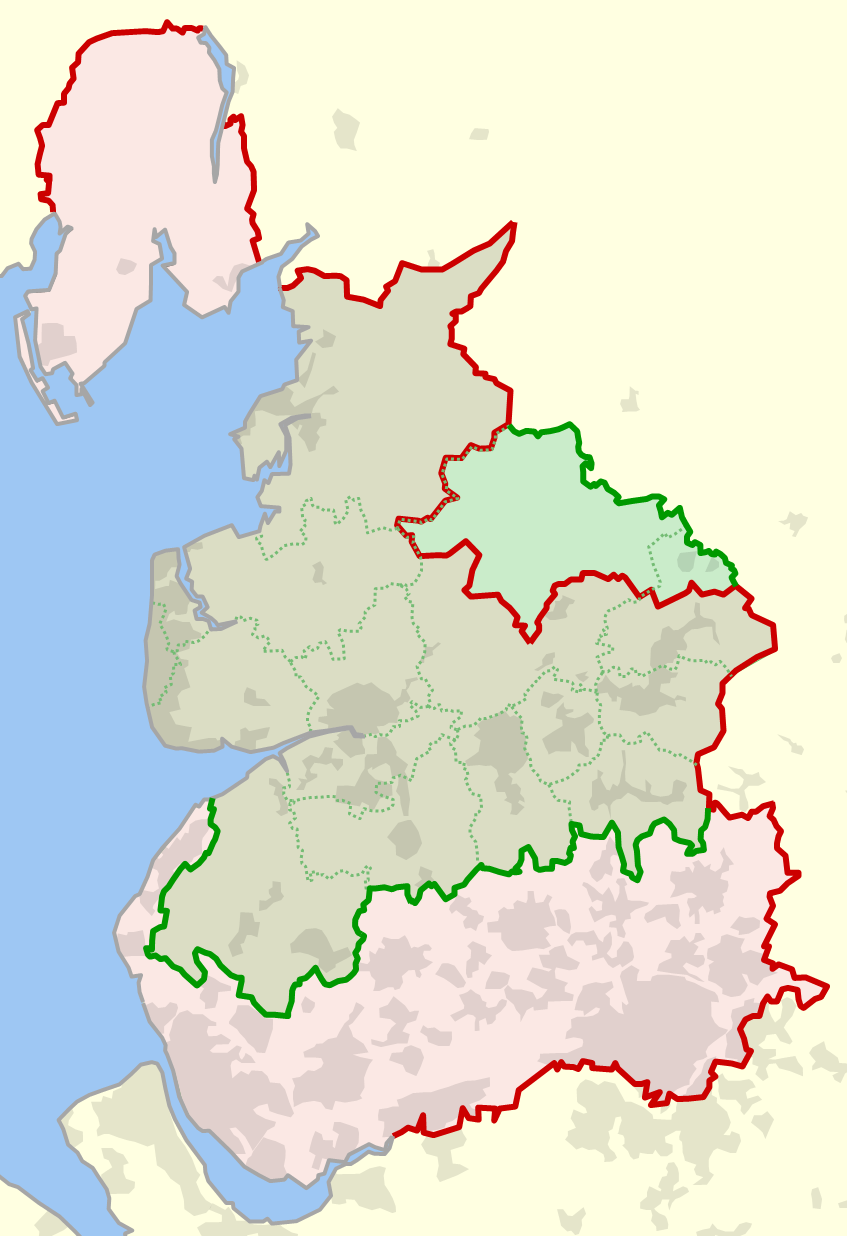
A map showing the historic boundaries of Lancashire in red and those of the current ceremonial county in green

The Local Government Act 1888 reformed English local government. The act introduced administrative counties governed by a county council, and Lancashire became one. It also introduced county boroughs, which remained part of their parent counties but had independent local government. In Lancashire, Barrow-in-Furness, Blackburn, Bolton, Bootle, Burnley, Bury, Liverpool, Manchester, Oldham, Preston, Rochdale, St Helens, Salford, Stockport (which was partially within Cheshire), and Wigan became county boroughs. Warrington became a county borough in 1900, Blackpool in 1904, and Southport in 1905. The resulting administrative borders could be complicated; for example, Lees Urban District formed a detached part of the administrative county between Oldham county borough and the West Riding of Yorkshire.

The Local Government Act 1972, which came into effect in 1974, reformed English local government again. It introduced metropolitan counties, which covered the largest urban areas, and non-metropolitan counties elsewhere. Both types of county were divided into districts, with local government functions divided between a county council and district councils.

The act changed the boundaries of Lancashire significantly. The south-east of the county became part of the metropolitan county of Greater Manchester, Warrington and Widnes in the south-centre became part of the non-metropolitan county of Cheshire, and the south-west became part of the metropolitan county of Merseyside. In the north, the detached Furness region became part of the non-metropolitan county of Cumbria. The remaining parts of the former administrative county, together with some western parts of the former West Riding of Yorkshire including Barnoldswick and Bowland Rural District, became part of the non-metropolitan county of Lancashire.

From 1974 until 1996, the non-metropolitan county contained fourteen non-metropolitan districts, with the provision of local government services divided between Lancashire County Council and the district councils. In 1996, the districts of Blackburn and Blackpool became unitary authority areas, meaning their councils have the powers and responsibilities of both a non-metropolitan county council and non-metropolitan district council.

=== Regional ===
Lancashire County Council, Blackpool Council, and Blackburn with Darwen Borough Council collaborate through the Lancashire Combined County Authority, which was established in February 2025.

=== Parliamentary constituencies ===
The ceremonial county is divided into sixteen constituencies for the purpose of parliamentary representation.

General Election 2019: Lancashire
Conservative	Labour	Liberal Democrats	Green	Brexit Party	Others	Turnout
331,000 −7,000	270,000 −92,000	37,000 +9,000	19,000 +10,000	16,000 +16,000	41,000 +39,000	716,000 −34,000

Overall Number of Seats as of 2019
Conservative	Labour	Liberal Democrats	Green	Brexit Party	Others
11 +3	4 −4	0 —	0 —	0 —	1 (Speaker) +1

=== Duchy of Lancaster ===
The Duchy of Lancaster, the private estate of the sovereign, exercises the right of the Crown in the County Palatine of Lancaster. The most prominent effect of this is that the Duchy administers bona vacantia within the County Palatine, receiving the property of persons who die intestate and where the legal ownership cannot be ascertained. The county palatine boundaries remain the same as the historic boundaries, ignoring subsequent local government reforms.

== Economy ==
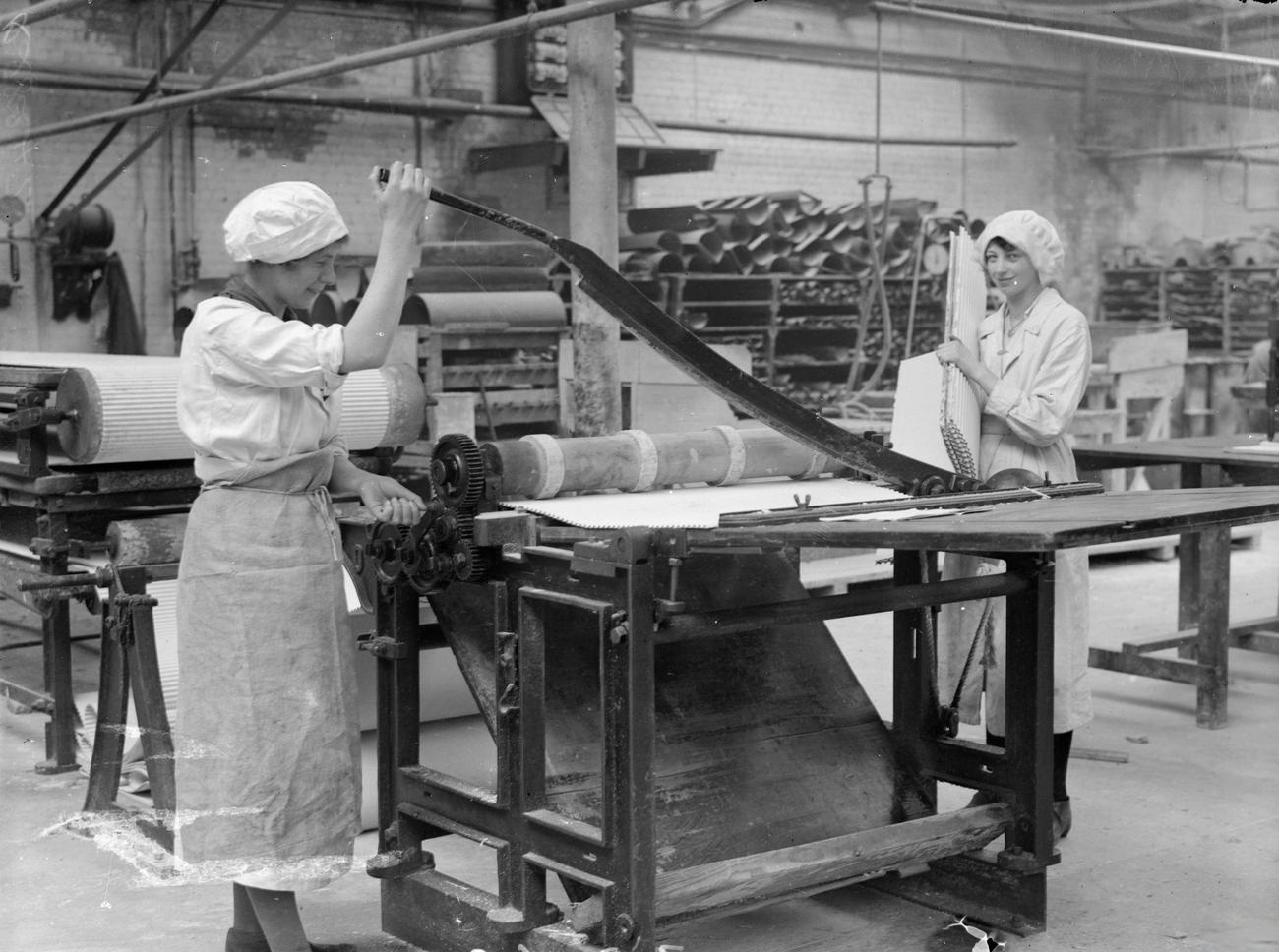
Workers cutting corrugated asbestos sheets in a Lancashire factory, September 1918

Lancashire in the 19th century was a major centre of economic activity, and hence one of wealth. Activities included coal mining, textile production, particularly that which used cotton, and fishing. Preston Docks, an industrial port is now disused. Lancashire was historically the location of the port of Liverpool while Barrow-in-Furness is famous for shipbuilding.

As of 2013, the largest private sector industry is the defence industry with BAE Systems Military Air Solutions division based in Warton on the Fylde coast. The division operates a manufacturing site in Samlesbury. Other defence firms include BAE Systems Global Combat Systems in Chorley, Ultra Electronics in Fulwood and Rolls-Royce plc in Barnoldswick.

The nuclear power industry has a plant at Springfields, Salwick operated by Westinghouse and Heysham nuclear power station is operated by British Energy. Other major manufacturing firms include Leyland Trucks, a subsidiary of Paccar building the DAF truck range.

Other companies with a major presence in Lancashire include:

- Airline Network, an internet travel company with headquarters in Preston.
- Baxi, a heating equipment manufacturer has a large manufacturing site in Bamber Bridge.
- Crown Paints, a major paint manufacturer based in Darwen.
- Dr. Oetker, an international food processing company, has a factory in Leyland that produces frozen pizza mostly under the Chicago Town and Ristorante brands.
- Enterprise plc, one of the UK's leading support services based in Leyland.
- Hanson plc, a building supplies company operates the Accrington brick works.
- Holland's Pies, a major manufacturer of baked goods based in Baxenden near Accrington.
- National Savings and Investments, the state-owned savings bank, which offers Premium Bonds and other savings products, has an office in Blackpool.
- Thwaites Brewery, a regional brewery founded in 1807 by Juno Thwaites in Blackburn.
- Xchanging, a company providing business process outsourcing services, with operations in Fulwood.
- AB InBev, a multinational beverage company, brews Budweiser, Stella Artois, Brahma, Bass and Boddingtons in Samlesbury.
- Fisherman's Friend, a confection company, famous for making strong mints and lozenges, based in Fleetwood.
- The Foulnaze cockle fishery is in Lytham. It has only opened the coastal cockle beds three times in twenty years; August 2013 was the last of these openings.

=== Enterprise zone ===
The creation of Lancashire Enterprise Zone was announced in 2011. It was launched in April 2012, based at the airfields owned by BAE Systems in Warton and Samlesbury. Warton Aerodrome covers 72 hectares (180 acres) and Samlesbury Aerodrome is 74 hectares. Development is coordinated by Lancashire Enterprise Partnership, Lancashire County Council and BAE Systems. The first businesses to move into the zone did so in March 2015, at Warton.

In March 2015 the government announced a new enterprise zone would be created at Blackpool Airport, using some airport and adjoining land. Operations at the airport will not be affected.

=== Economic output ===
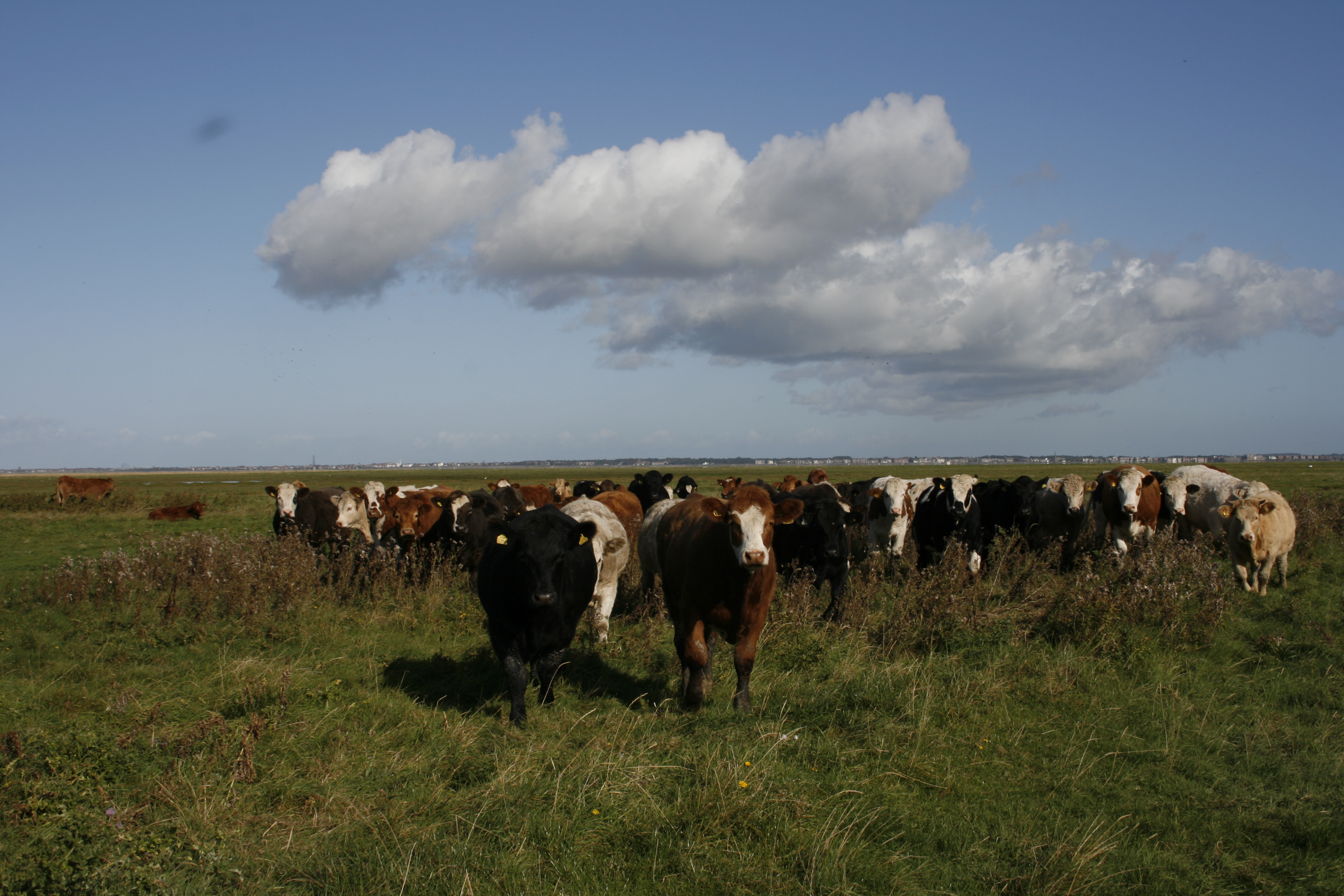
Cattle grazing on the salt marshes of the Ribble Estuary near Banks

This is a chart of trend of regional gross value added of the non-metropolitan county of Lancashire at basic prices published by the Office for National Statistics with figures in millions of British pounds sterling.

Year	Regional Gross Value Added (Note: Components may not sum to totals due to rounding)	Agriculture (Note: Includes hunting and forestry)	Industry (Note: Includes energy and construction)	Services (Note: Includes financial intermediation services indirectly measured)
1995	13,789	344	5,461	7,984
2000	16,584	259	6,097	10,229
2003	19,206	294	6,352	12,560

== Education ==
Lancashire has a mostly comprehensive system with four state grammar schools. Not including sixth form colleges, there are 77 state schools (not including Burnley's new schools) and 24 independent schools. Sixth form provision is limited at most schools in most districts, with only Fylde and Lancaster districts having mostly sixth forms at schools. The rest depend on FE colleges and sixth form colleges, where they exist. South Ribble has the largest school population and Fylde the smallest (only three schools). Burnley's schools have had a new broom and have essentially been knocked down and started again in 2006. There are many Church of England and Catholic faith schools in Lancashire.

Lancashire is home to four universities: Lancaster University (a member of the N8 Research Partnership of northern research-intensive universities), the University of Lancashire in Preston and the Lancaster campus of the University of Cumbria (both members of the MillionPlus group of modern universities), and Edge Hill University in Ormskirk (founded as a teacher training college in 1885). Seven colleges offer higher education courses.

== Transport ==
=== Roadways ===
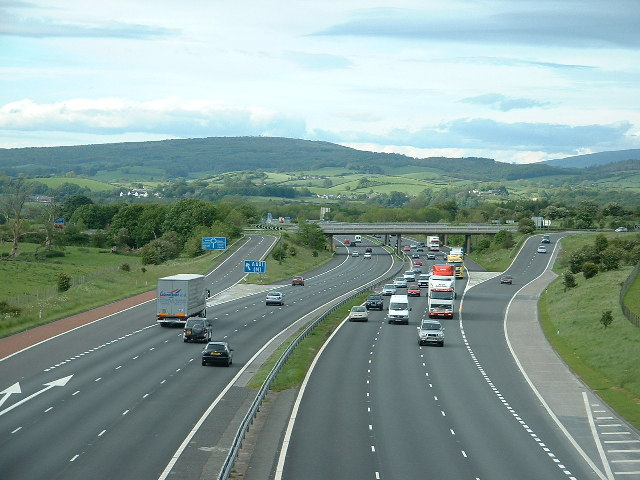
The M6 near Carnforth

The Lancashire economy relies strongly on the M6 motorway which runs from north to south, past Lancaster and Preston. The M55 connects Preston to Blackpool and is 11.5 miles (18.3 km) long. The M65 motorway from Colne, connects Burnley, Accrington, Blackburn to Preston. The M61 from Preston via Chorley and the M66 starting 500 metres (0.3 mi) inside the county boundary near Edenfield, provide links between Lancashire and Manchester, and the trans-Pennine M62. The M58 crosses the southernmost part of the county from the M6 near Wigan to Liverpool via Skelmersdale.

Other major roads include the east–west A59 between Liverpool in Merseyside and Skipton in North Yorkshire via Ormskirk, Preston and Clitheroe, and the connecting A565 to Southport; the A56 from Ramsbottom to Padiham via Haslingden and from Colne to Skipton; the A585 from Kirkham to Fleetwood; the A666 from the A59 north of Blackburn to Bolton via Darwen; and the A683 from Heysham to Kirkby Lonsdale via Lancaster.

Several bus companies run bus services in the Lancashire area serving the main towns and villages in the county with some services running to neighbouring areas, Cumbria, Greater Manchester, Merseyside and West Yorkshire. Some of these include:

- Stagecoach Merseyside & South Lancashire
- Stagecoach Cumbria & North Lancashire
- Bee Network
- Transdev Blazefield
- Preston Bus

=== Railways ===
Primary route
Secondary route
Rural route
Goods only
Heritage railway
Light rail/tramway
Disused railway

The West Coast Main Line provides direct rail links with London, Glasgow and other major cities, with stations at Preston and Lancaster. East-west connections are carried via the East Lancashire Line between Blackpool and Colne via Lytham, Preston, Blackburn, Accrington and Burnley. The Ribble Valley Line runs from Bolton to Hellifield with regular passenger services running as far as Clitheroe via Darwen and Blackburn. There are connecting lines from Preston to Ormskirk and Bolton, and from Lancaster to Morecambe, Heysham and Skipton.

=== Airways ===
There are no airports within Lancashire offering commercial flights, although these were formerly operated from Blackpool Airport until 2014, which is still the home of flying schools, private operators and North West Air Ambulance. Manchester Airport is the main airport in the region. Liverpool John Lennon Airport is nearby, while the closest airport to the Pendle area is Leeds Bradford.

There is an operational airfield at Warton near Preston where there is a major assembly and test facility for BAE Systems.

=== Waterways ===
Heysham offers ferry services to Ireland and the Isle of Man. As part of its industrial past, Lancashire gave rise to an extensive network of canals, which extend into neighbouring counties. These include the Leeds and Liverpool Canal, Lancaster Canal, Sankey Canal, Bridgewater Canal, Rochdale Canal, Ashton Canal and Manchester Ship Canal.

== Demography ==
The major settlements in the ceremonial county are concentrated on the Fylde coast (the Blackpool Urban Area), and a number of notable settlements along west to east of the M65: including the city of Preston and towns of Blackburn, Darwen, Accrington, Burnley, Padiham, Brierfield, Nelson and Colne. South of Preston are the towns of Leyland and Chorley (which, with Preston, formed Central Lancashire New Town designated in 1970), as well as Penwortham, Skelmersdale and Ormskirk.

The north of the county is predominantly rural and sparsely populated, except for the city of Lancaster and the towns of Morecambe and Heysham, the three of which form a large conurbation of almost 100,000 people. Lancashire is home to a significant Asian population, numbering over 70,000 and 6% of the county's population, and concentrated largely in the former cotton mill towns in the south east.

Population totals within the post-1998 boundaries of the non-metropolitan county

Year	Pop.	±% p.a.
1801	163,310	—
1811	192,283	+1.65%
1821	236,724	+2.10%
1831	261,710	+1.01%
1841	289,925	+1.03%
1851	313,957	+0.80%
1861	419,412	+2.94%
1871	524,869	+2.27%

Year	Pop.	±% p.a.
1881	630,323	+1.85%
1891	736,233	+1.57%
1901	798,545	+0.82%
1911	873,210	+0.90%
1921	886,114	+0.15%
1931	902,965	+0.19%
1941	922,812	+0.22%
1951	948,592	+0.28%

Year	Pop.	±% p.a.
1961	991,648	+0.44%
1971	1,049,013	+0.56%
1981	1,076,146	+0.26%
1991	1,122,097	+0.42%
2001	1,134,976	+0.11%
2011	1,171,339	+0.32%

Pre-1998 statistics were gathered from local government areas that now comprise the non-metropolitan county
Source: Great Britain Historical GIS.

== Culture ==
=== Symbols ===
The flag designed to represent Lancashire

The Red Rose of Lancaster is the county flower found on the county's heraldic badge and flag. The rose was a symbol of the House of Lancaster, immortalised in the verse "In the battle for England's head/York was white, Lancaster red" (referring to the 15th-century Wars of the Roses).

A flag consisting of a red rose on a gold field was designed by the Friends of Real Lancashire, a pressure group which promotes the historic county, and registered with the Flag Institute, a vexillological charity, in 2008. The flag has been flown from public buildings within the historic county boundaries on Lancashire Day (27 November), including from County Hall in Preston, St Helens Town Hall, and in parts of the Metropolitan Borough of Oldham which were previously in Lancashire. It has also been flown from the Ministry for Housing, Communities, and Local Government building in London.

An alternative flag consists of a red rose on a white field. This design had already been registered by Montrose in Scotland.

=== Sport ===
==== Cricket ====
Lancashire County Cricket Club has been one of the most successful county cricket teams, particularly in the one-day game. It is home to England cricket team members James Anderson and Jos Buttler. The County Ground, Old Trafford, Trafford, has been the home cricket ground of LCCC since 1864.

Local cricket leagues include the Lancashire League, the Central Lancashire League and the North Lancashire and Cumbria League.

Since 2000, the designated ECB Premier League for Lancashire has been the Liverpool and District Cricket Competition.

==== Football ====
The Red Rose of Lancaster

Football in Lancashire is governed by the Lancashire County Football Association which, like most county football associations, has boundaries that are aligned roughly with the historic counties. The Manchester Football Association and Liverpool County Football Association respectively operate in Greater Manchester and Merseyside.

Lancashire clubs were prominent in the formation of the Football League in 1888, with the league being officially named at a meeting in Manchester. Of the twelve founder members of the league, six were from Lancashire: Accrington, Blackburn Rovers, Bolton Wanderers, Burnley, Everton, and Preston North End.

The Football League is now based in Preston. The National Football Museum was founded at Deepdale, Preston in 2001, but moved to Manchester in 2012.

Six professional full-time teams were based in Lancashire at the start of the 2025–26 season:

- Premier League: Burnley
- Championship: Blackburn Rovers and Preston North End
- League One: Blackpool
- League Two: Accrington Stanley and Fleetwood Town

The county's most prominent football rivalries are the East Lancashire derby between Blackburn Rovers and Burnley, and the West Lancashire derby between Blackpool and Preston North End.

A further nine professional full-time teams lie within the historical borders of Lancashire but outside of the current ceremonial county. These include the Premier League clubs Everton, Liverpool, Manchester City and Manchester United.

==== Rugby league ====
Along with Yorkshire and Cumberland, Lancashire is recognised as the heartland of Rugby League. The county has produced many successful top flight clubs such as St. Helens, Wigan, Warrington, Oldham, Salford and Widnes. The county was once the focal point for many of the sport's professional competitions including the Lancashire League competition which ran from 1895 to 1970, and the Lancashire County Cup which ran until 1993. Rugby League has also seen a representative fixture between Lancashire and Yorkshire contested 89 times since its inception in 1895. In recent times there were several rugby league teams that are based within the ceremonial county which include Blackpool Panthers, East Lancashire Lions, and Blackpool Sea Eagles.

==== Archery ====
There are many archery clubs located within Lancashire. In 2004 Lancashire took the winning title at the Inter-counties championships from Yorkshire who had held it for 7 years.

==== Wrestling ====
Lancashire has a centuries-long history of combat sports and wrestling, developing its own style called Lancashire wrestling, and becoming a breeding ground for many of Britain's best amateur and professional wrestlers. Through travelling performers and immigration, the style spread abroad to British colonies, Europe, the United States, and other countries. It was a primary influence on catch wrestling and its descendants including freestyle wrestling, American folkstyle wrestling, theatrical professional wrestling, and mixed martial arts. It was preserved due to the influence of Lancashire native Billy Riley and his gym, popularly known as The Snake Pit, and students such as Karl Gotch and Billy Robinson. It became particularly influential in Japan, where catch wrestling is popularly referred to as "Lancashire style" (ランカシャースタイル).

=== Music ===
==== Folk music ====
Lancashire has a long and highly productive tradition of music making. In the early modern era the county shared in the national tradition of balladry, including perhaps the finest border ballad, "The Ballad of Chevy Chase", thought to have been composed by the Lancashire-born minstrel Richard Sheale. The county was also a common location for folk songs, including "The Lancashire Miller", "Warrington Ale" and "The soldier's farewell to Manchester", while Liverpool, as a major seaport, was the subject of many sea shanties, including "The Leaving of Liverpool" and "Maggie May", beside several local Wassailing songs. In the Industrial Revolution changing social and economic patterns helped create new traditions and styles of folk song, often linked to migration and patterns of work. These included processional dances, often associated with rushbearing or the Wakes Week festivities, and types of step dance, most famously clog dancing.

A local pioneer of folk song collection in the first half of the 19th century was Shakespearean scholar James Orchard Halliwell, but it was not until the second folk revival in the 20th century that the full range of song from the county, including industrial folk song, began to gain attention. The county produced one of the major figures of the revival in Ewan MacColl, but also a local champion in Harry Boardman, who from 1965 onwards probably did more than anyone to popularise and record the folk song of the county. Perhaps the most influential folk artists to emerge from the region in the late 20th century were Liverpool folk group the Spinners, and from Manchester folk troubadour Roy Harper and musician, comedian and broadcaster Mike Harding. The region is home to numerous folk clubs, many of them catering to Irish and Scottish folk music. Regular folk festivals include the Fylde Folk Festival at Fleetwood.

==== Classical music ====
Lancashire had a lively culture of choral and classical music, with very large numbers of local church choirs from the 17th century, leading to the foundation of local choral societies from the mid-18th century, often particularly focused on performances of the music of Handel and his contemporaries. It also played a major part in the development of brass bands which emerged in the county, particularly in the textile and coalfield areas, in the 19th century. The first open competition for brass bands was held at Manchester in 1853, and continued annually until the 1980s.

The vibrant brass band culture of the area made an important contribution to the foundation and staffing of the Hallé Orchestra from 1857, the oldest extant professional orchestra in the United Kingdom. The same local musical tradition produced eminent figures such as Sir William Walton (1902–88), son of an Oldham choirmaster and music teacher, Sir Thomas Beecham (1879–1961), born in St. Helens, who began his career by conducting local orchestras and Alan Rawsthorne (1905–71) born in Haslingden. The conductor David Atherton, co-founder of the London Sinfonietta, was born in Blackpool in 1944. Lancashire also produced more populist figures, such as early musical theatre composer Leslie Stuart (1863–1928), born in Southport, who began his musical career as organist of Salford Cathedral.

More recent Lancashire-born composers include Hugh Wood (1932– Parbold), Sir Peter Maxwell Davies (1934–2016, Salford), Sir Harrison Birtwistle (1934–2022, Accrington), Gordon Crosse (1937–, Bury), John McCabe (1939–2015, Huyton), Roger Smalley (1943–2015, Swinton), Nigel Osborne (1948–, Manchester), Steve Martland (1954–2013, Liverpool), Simon Holt (1958–, Bolton) and Philip Cashian (1963–, Manchester). The Royal Manchester College of Music was founded in 1893 to provide a northern counterpart to the London musical colleges. It merged with the Northern College of Music (formed in 1920) to form the Royal Northern College of Music in 1972.

==== Popular music ====
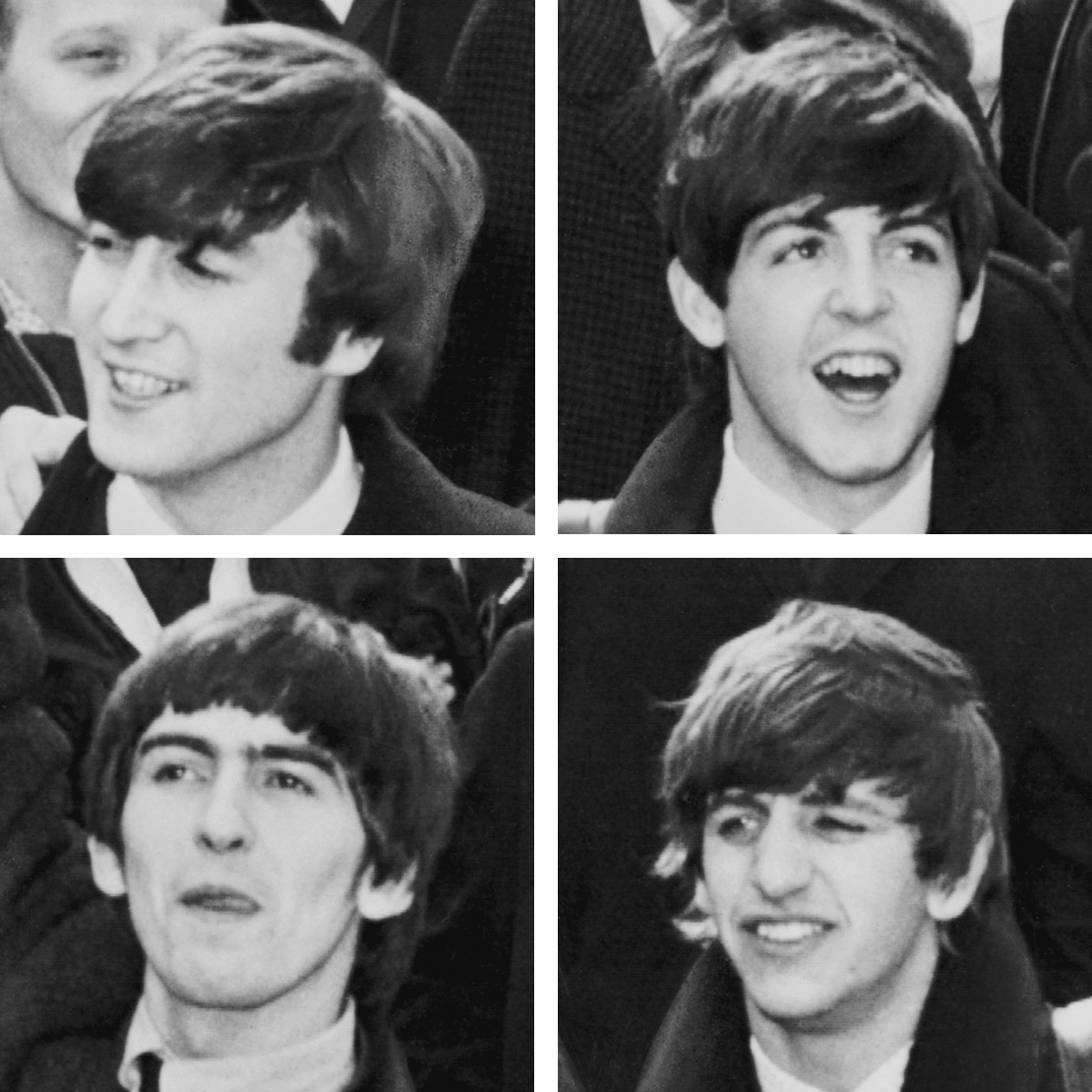
The Beatles began in Liverpool before the city's county was changed from Lancashire to Merseyside

Liverpool, both during its time in Lancashire and after being moved to the new county of Merseyside, has produced a number of successful musicians. This includes pop stars such as Frankie Vaughan and Lita Roza, as well as rock stars such as Billy Fury, who is considered to be one of the most successful British rock and roll stars of all time. Many Lancashire towns had vibrant skiffle scenes in the late 1950s, out of which a culture of beat groups emerged by the early 1960s, particularly around Liverpool and Manchester. It has been estimated that there were at least 350 bands—including the Beatles—active in and around Liverpool during this era, playing ballrooms, concert halls, and clubs. A number of Liverpool performers followed the Beatles into the charts, including Gerry & the Pacemakers, the Searchers, and Cilla Black.

The first musicians to break through in the UK who were not from Liverpool or managed by Beatles manager Brian Epstein were Manchester's Freddie and the Dreamers, with Herman's Hermits and the Hollies also hailing from Manchester. The Beatles led a movement by various beat groups from the region which culminated in the British Invasion of the US, which in turn made a major contribution to the development of modern rock music. After the decline of beat groups in the late 1960s, the centre of rock culture shifted to London, and there were relatively few Lancashire bands who achieved national prominence until the growth of a disco scene and the punk rock revolution in the mid-and-late 1970s.

=== Cuisine ===
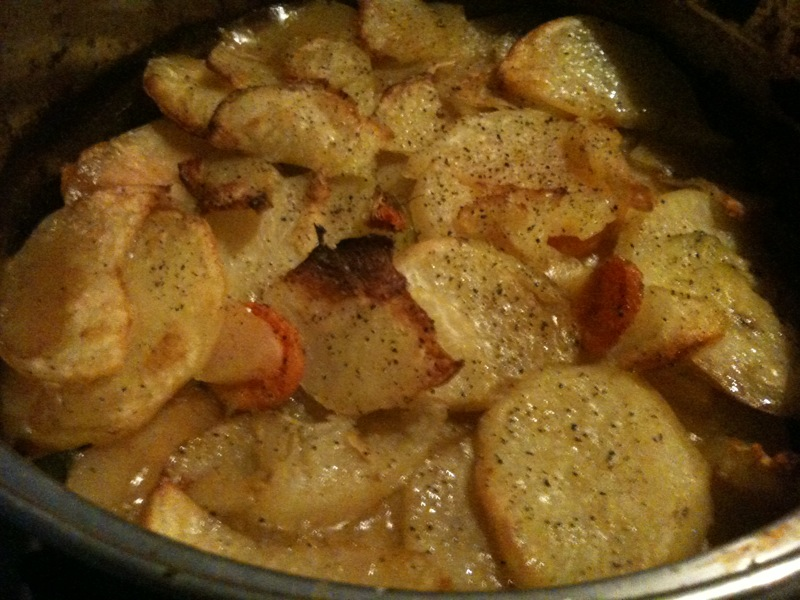
Lancashire hotpot

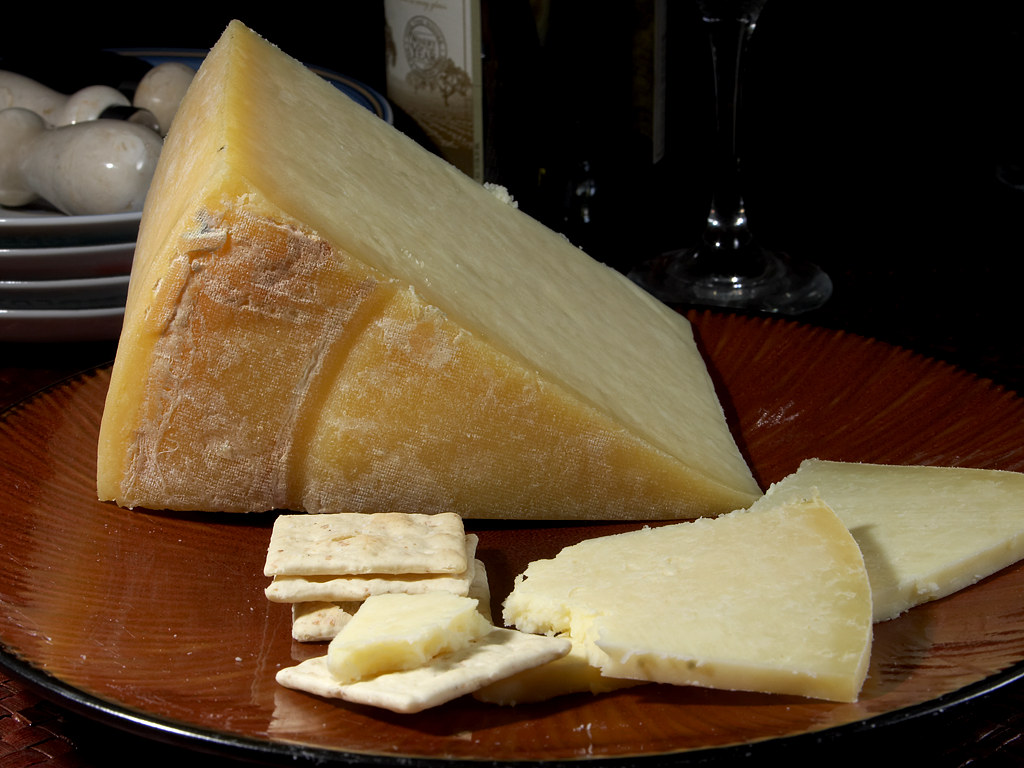
Lancashire cheese

Lancashire is the origin of the Lancashire hotpot, a casserole dish traditionally made with lamb. Other traditional foods from the area include:

- Black peas, also known as parched peas: popular in Darwen, Bolton and Preston.
- Bury black pudding has long been associated with the county. The most notable brand, Chadwick's Original Bury Black Puddings, are still sold on Bury Market, and are manufactured in Rossendale.
- Butter cake: slice of bread and butter.
- Butter pie: a savoury pie containing potatoes, onion and butter. Usually associated with Preston.
- Clapbread: a thin oatcake made from unleavened dough cooked on a griddle.
- Chorley cakes: from the town of Chorley.
- Eccles cakes are small, round cakes filled with currants and made from flaky pastry with butter, originally made in Eccles.
- Fag pie: pie made from chopped dried figs, sugar and lard. Associated with Blackburn and Burnley, where it was the highlight of Fag Pie Sunday (Mid-Lent Sunday).
- Fish and chips: the first fish and chip shop in northern England opened in Mossley, near Oldham, around 1863.
- Frog-i'-th'-'ole pudding: now known as "toad in the hole"
- Frumenty: sweet porridge. Once a popular dish at Lancashire festivals, such as Christmas and Easter Monday.
- Goosnargh cakes: small flat shortbread biscuits with coriander or caraway seeds pressed into the biscuit before baking. Traditionally baked on feast days like Shrove Tuesday.
- Jannock: cake or small loaf of oatmeal. Allegedly introduced to Lancashire (possibly Bolton) by weavers of Flemish origin.
- Lancashire cheese has been made in the county for several centuries. Beacon Fell Traditional Lancashire Cheese has been awarded EU Protected Designation of Origin (PDO) status.
- Lancashire Flat Cake: A lemon flavoured sponge cake, traditionally made with a couple too many eggs, best eaten after being chilled.
- Lancashire oatcake, resembling a large oval pancake, eaten either moist or dried
- Lancashire Sauce, a lightly spiced mustard produced by the Entwistle family of Bury
- "Stew and hard": a beef and cowheel stew with dried Lancashire oatcake
- Nettle porridge: a common starvation diet in Lancashire in the early 19th century. Made from boiled stinging nettles and sometimes a handful of meal.
- Ormskirk gingerbread: local delicacy that was sold throughout South Lancashire.
- Parkin: a ginger cake with oatmeal.
- Pobs or pobbies: bread and milk.
- Potato hotpot: a variation of the Lancashire Hotpot without meat that is also known as fatherless pie.
- Ran Dan: barley bread. A last resort for the poor at the end of the 18th century and beginning of the 19th century.
- Rag pudding: traditional suet pudding filled with minced meat, originating in Oldham.
- Throdkins: a traditional breakfast food of the Fylde.
- Uncle Joe's Mint Balls: traditional mints produced by William Santus & Co. Ltd. in Wigan.

=== Cinema ===
Whistle Down the Wind (1961) was directed by Bryan Forbes, set at the foot of Worsaw Hill and in Burnley, and starred local Lancashire schoolchildren.

The tunnel scene was shot on the old Bacup-Rochdale railway line, location 53°41'29.65"N, 2°11'25.18"W, off the A6066 (New Line) where the line passes beneath Stack Lane. The tunnel is still there, in use as an industrial unit but the railway has long since been removed.

Funny Bones (1995) was set mostly in Blackpool, after opening scenes in Las Vegas.

== Media ==
=== Television ===
The county is covered by BBC North West and ITV Granada which broadcast from Salford. Television signals are received from the Winter Hill TV transmitter. A small part of East Lancashire around Barnoldswick and Earby is served by BBC Yorkshire and ITV Yorkshire broadcasting from Leeds. This area is served by a local transmitter in Skipton which is relayed from the Emley Moor TV transmitter.

=== Radio ===
BBC Local Radio for the county is served by BBC Radio Lancashire which broadcast from its studios in Blackburn, BBC Radio Merseyside can be heard in southern parts, BBC Radio Manchester in the east and BBC Radio Cumbria in the north. County-wide commercial stations are Greatest Hits Radio Lancashire, Capital Manchester and Lancashire, Heart North West, and Smooth North West. Community based stations are Beyond Radio (covering northwestern Lancashire), Pendle Community Radio (serving the Pendle area), Rossendale Radio (for Rossendale), and Central Radio (for The Fylde, Preston, Leyland and Chorley areas of Lancashire).

=== Newspapers ===
The county is served by these local newspapers:

- Lancashire Telegraph (daily, East Lancashire, published in Blackburn)
- Lancashire Evening Post (daily, Central and Northern Lancashire, published in Fulwood, Preston)
- Accrington Observer (weekly)
- Blackpool Gazette (daily)
- Burnley Express (twice weekly)
- Clitheroe Advertiser and Times (weekly)
- Fleetwood Weekly News
- Lytham St Annes Express (weekly)
- Nelson Leader (weekly)
- Pendle Express (weekly)
- Rossendale Free Press (weekly)
- The Visitor (weekly, published in Morecambe)

The national weekly Farmers Guardian is published in Fulwood, Preston.

== Places of interest ==
Key
	Abbey/Priory/Cathedral
Accessible open space	Accessible open space
	Amusement/Theme Park
	Castle
Country Park	Country Park
	English Heritage
	Forestry Commission
Heritage railway	Heritage railway
Historic house	Historic House
Places of Worship	Places of Worship
Museum (free) Museum	Museum (free/not free)
National Trust	National Trust
	Theatre
	Zoo

The following are places of interest in the ceremonial county:

- Arnside and Silverdale AONB
- Astley Hall
- Avenham Park and Miller Park, Preston
- Bank Hall
- Beacon Fell
- Blackburn Cathedral
- Blackpool Pleasure Beach
- Blackpool Tower
- Blackpool Zoo
- British Commercial Vehicle Museum, Leyland
- Brockholes (nature reserve), Preston
- Camelot Theme Park
- Clitheroe Castle
- Darwen Tower
- East Lancashire Railway
- Forest of Bowland: Area of Outstanding Natural Beauty
- Gawthorpe Hall, Padiham
- Harris Museum, Preston
- Helmshore Mills Textile Museum
- Hoghton Tower
- Irwell Sculpture Trail
- Lancashire Infantry Museum, Preston
- Lancaster Castle
- Lancaster Cathedral
- Lathom Park Chapel, site of Lathom House, seat of the Earls of Derby
- Lytham Hall
- Leighton Moss nature reserve, Royal Society for the Protection of Birds
- Martin Mere, Wildfowl and Wetlands Trust, Burscough
- Morecambe Bay
- Museum of Lancashire, Preston
- Pendle Hill
- The Pennines
- Preston Dock
- Ribble Steam Railway, Preston
- Rivington Pike
- Rufford Old Hall
- Samlesbury Hall
- St Mary's Church, Fernyhalgh, Preston and the Ladyewell Shrine
- St Walburge's Church, Preston
- Stonyhurst College – manor house dating from 1592, now a Jesuit public school
- Towneley Hall, Burnley
- Queen Street Mill, Burnley
- West Lancashire Light Railway
- West Pennine Moors
- Williamson Park and the Ashton Memorial
- Witton Country Park
- Yarrow Valley Park
- White Coppice
- Haigh Hall

=== Gallery ===
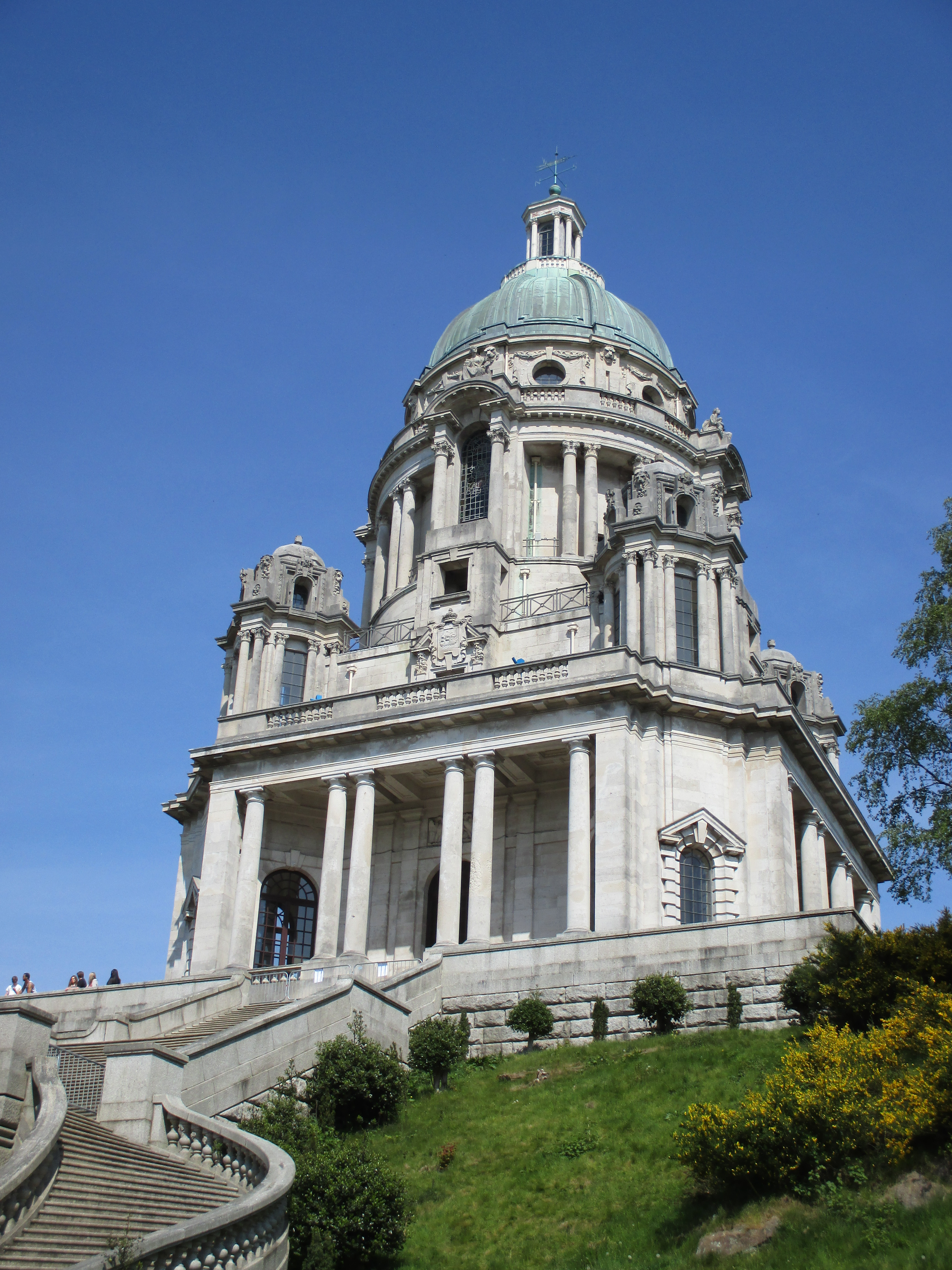
Ashton Memorial, Lancaster

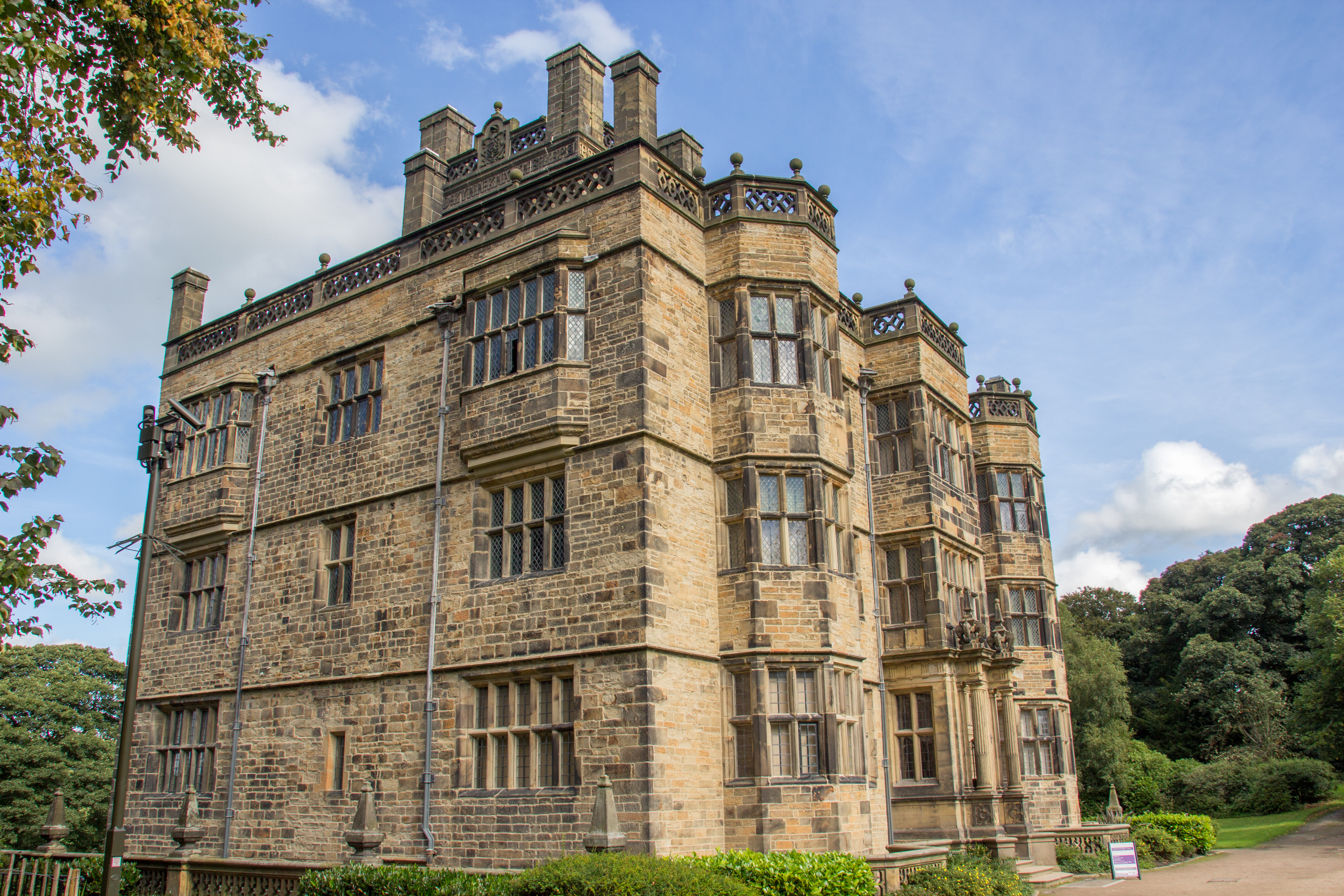
Gawthorpe Hall, Burnley, an Elizabethan country house.

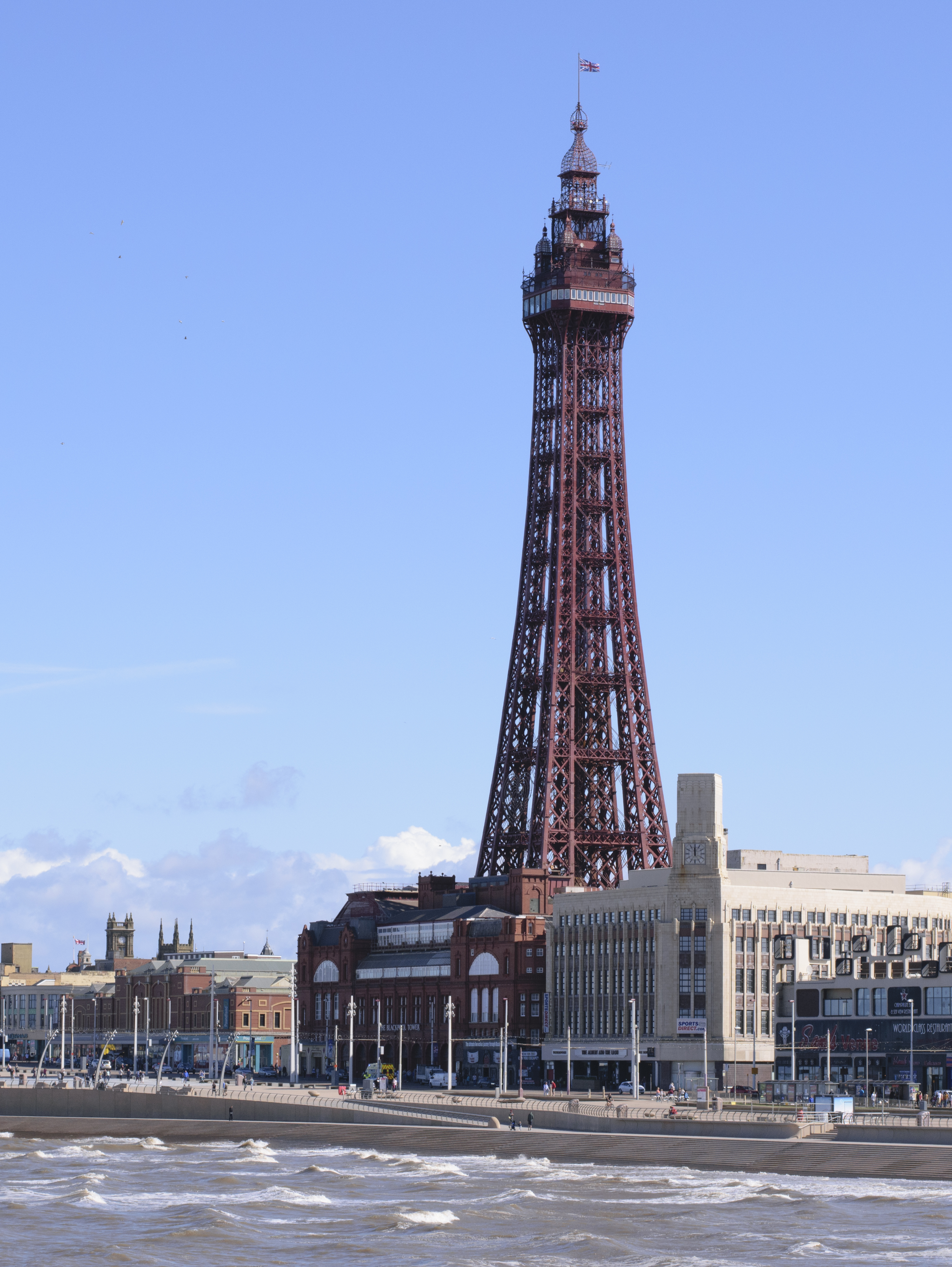
Blackpool Tower, completed in 1894

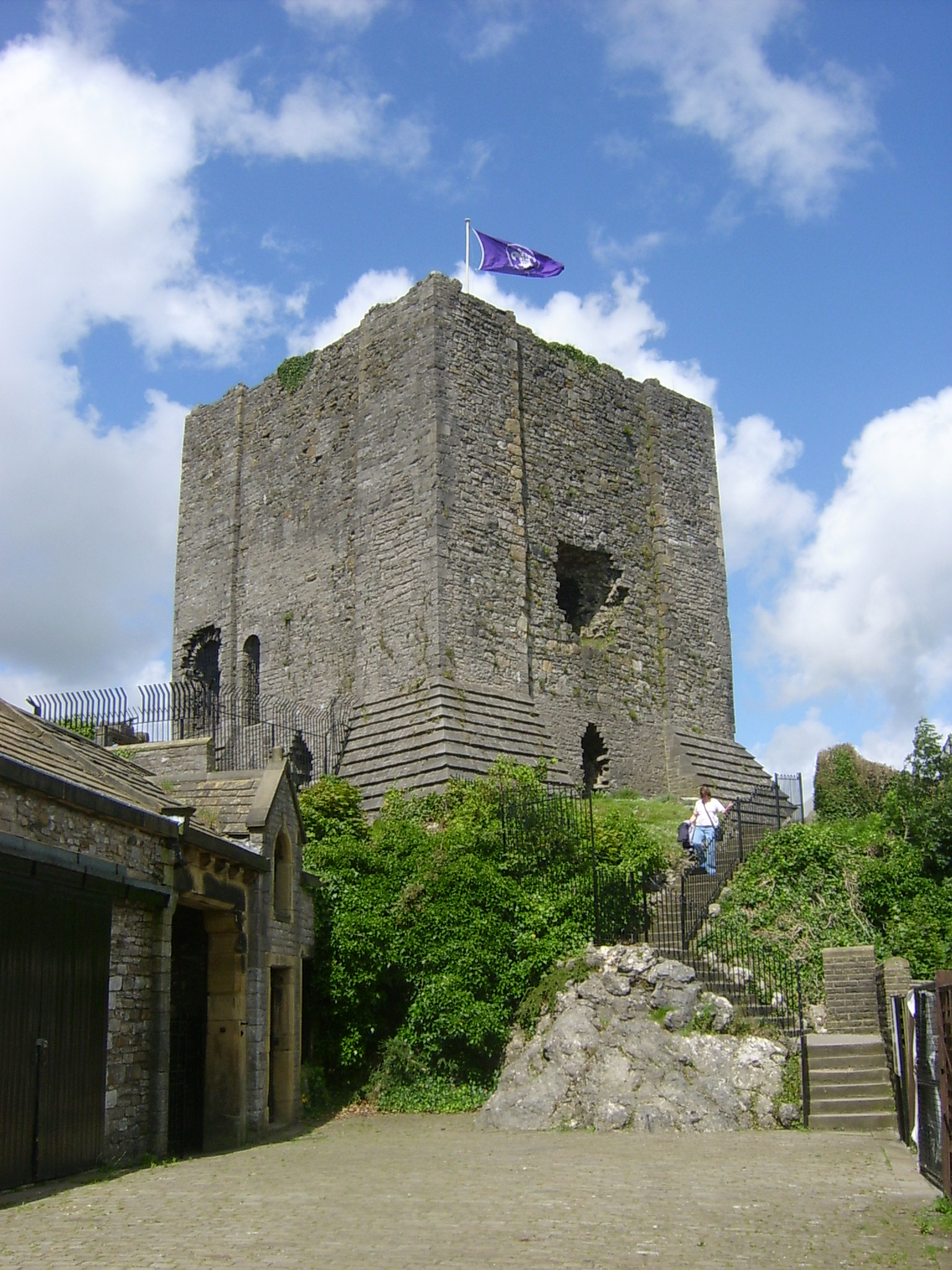
Clitheroe Castle

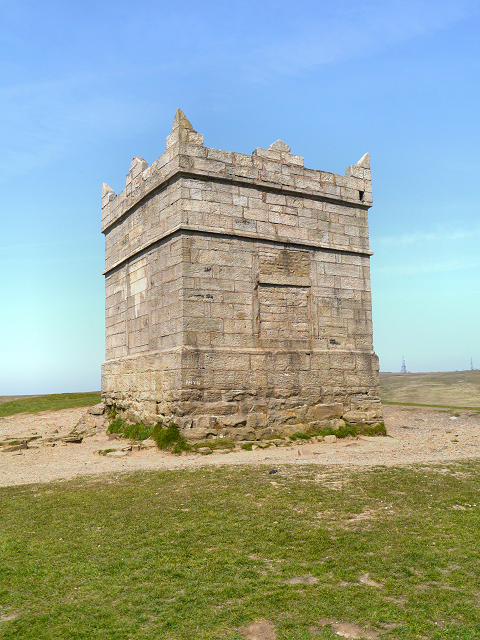
Rivington Pike, near Horwich, atop the West Pennine Moors, is one of the most popular walking destinations in the county; on a clear day the whole of the county can be viewed from here.

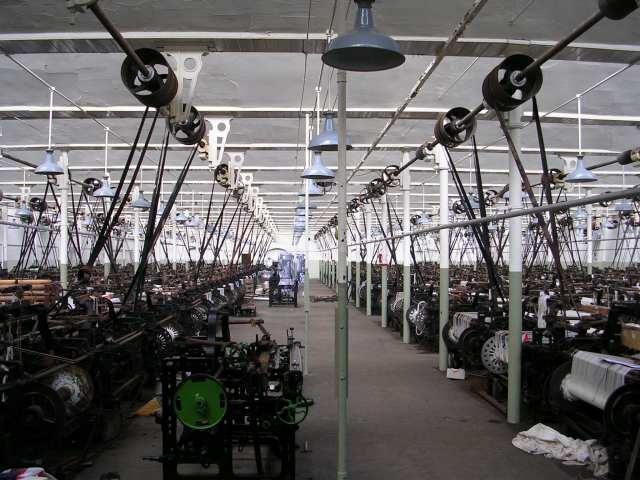
Queen Street Mill, the world's only surviving steam-driven cotton weaving shed, located in Burnley

== See also ==
- Custos Rotulorum of Lancashire – Keepers of the Rolls
- Duke of Lancaster's Regiment – Infantry regiment traditionally recruited in district
- Grade I listed buildings in Lancashire
- Grade II* listed buildings in Lancashire
- Healthcare in Lancashire
- High Sheriff of Lancashire
- Lancashire (UK Parliament constituency) – Historical list of MPs for Lancashire constituency
- Lancashire Constabulary
- Lancashire dialect
- Lancashire Police and Crime Commissioner
- List of collieries in Lancashire since 1854
- List of English and Welsh endowed schools (19th century)#Lancashire
- List of mining disasters in Lancashire
- Lord Lieutenant of Lancashire
- Roses rivalry
- Scheduled monuments in Lancashire

== Bibliography ==
- Crosby, A. (1996). A History of Cheshire. The Darwen County History Series. Chichester, West Sussex, UK: Phillimore & Co. Ltd. ISBN 0-85033-932-4.
- Harris, B. E., and Thacker, A. T. (1987). The Victoria History of the County of Chester. Volume 1: Physique, Prehistory, Roman, Anglo-Saxon, and Domesday. Oxford: Oxford University Press. ISBN 0-19-722761-9.
- Morgan, P. (1978). Domesday Book Cheshire: Including Lancashire, Cumbria, and North Wales. Chichester, Sussex: Phillimore & Co. Ltd. ISBN 0-85033-140-4.
- Phillips A. D. M., and Phillips, C. B. (2002). A New Historical Atlas of Cheshire. Chester, UK: Cheshire County Council and Cheshire Community Council Publications Trust. ISBN 0-904532-46-1.
- Sylvester, D. (1980). A History of Cheshire (2nd ed.). The Darwen County History Series. London and Chichester, Sussex: Phillimore & Co. Ltd. ISBN 0-85033-384-9.
