= Eccles cake =

Small, round, currant-filled pastry

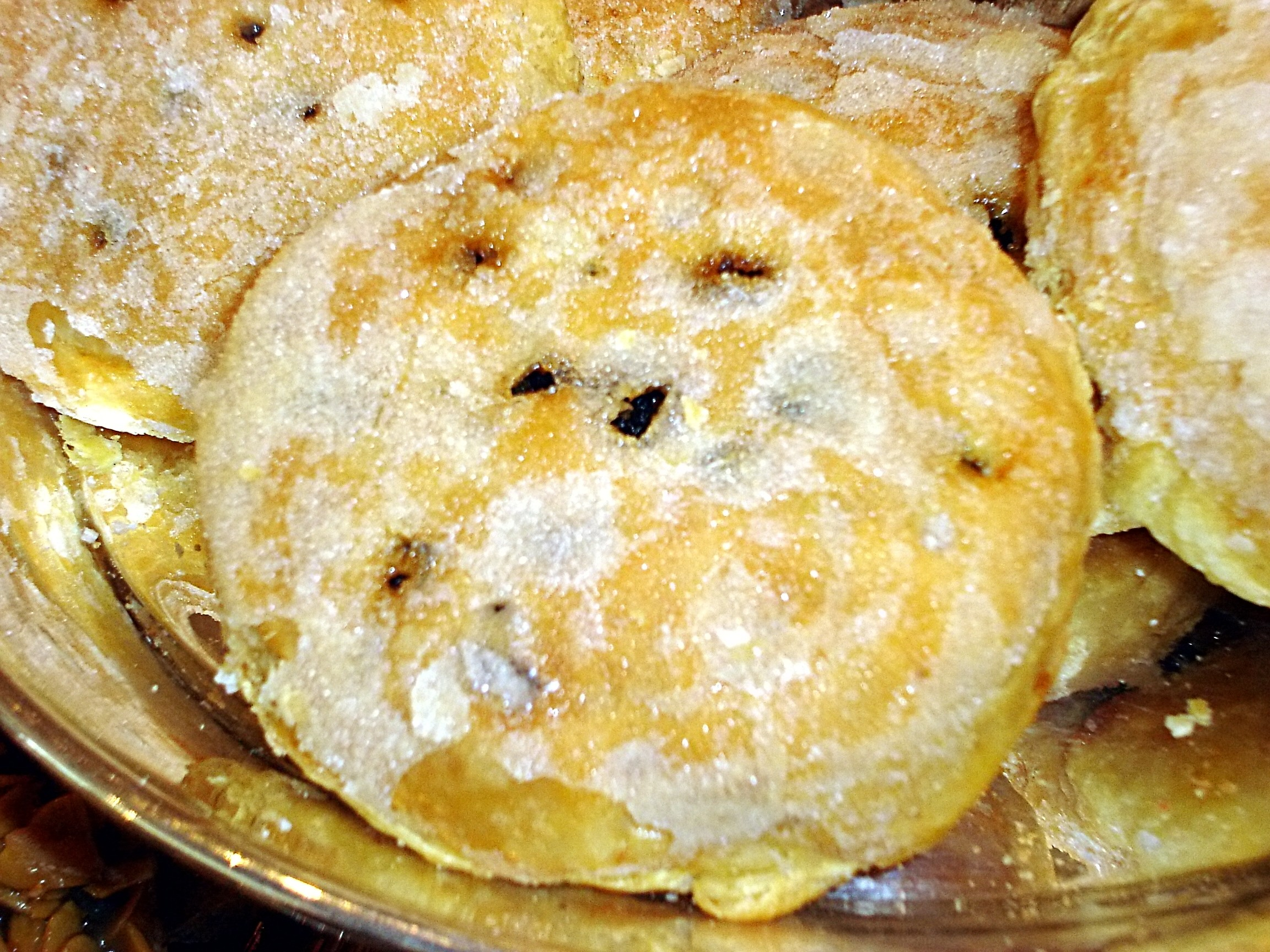
- A freshly baked Eccles cake
- Type: Cake
- Place of origin: England
- Region or state: Eccles, Greater Manchester
- Main ingredients: Flaky pastry, butter, currants

An Eccles cake is a small, round turnover, filled with currants and made from flaky pastry with butter, sometimes topped with brown sugar. It originated in Eccles, England.

== Name and origin ==
The cake is named after the English town of Eccles, which is in the historic county of Lancashire and in the ceremonial county of Greater Manchester. Eccles cakes are a Lancashire food tradition, with similar cakes found in other parts of the county, and are traditionally eaten with Lancashire cheese.

The origin of the recipe is not known, but James Birch is credited as the first to sell Eccles cakes commercially, at the corner of Vicarage Road and St Mary's Road, now Church Street, in the town centre, in 1793. John Ayto states that Elizabeth Raffald may have invented the Eccles Cake.

The word cake is used in the older general sense of a "portion of bread containing additional ingredients". Eccles cakes do not have Protected Geographical Status, so may be manufactured anywhere and still labelled "Eccles cakes".

== See also ==
=== Similar pastries ===
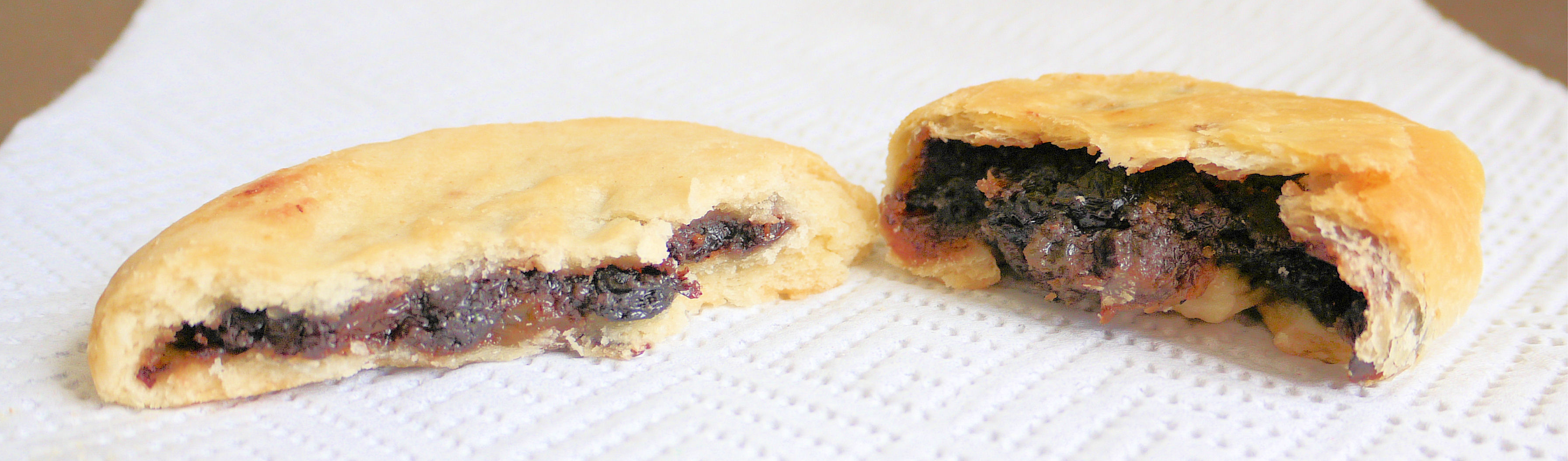
A Chorley cake (left) and an Eccles cake (right)

- Chorley cake
- Sad cake
- Banbury cake
