= Throdkin =

English breakfast food

Throdkin is a traditional breakfast food of the Fylde, Lancashire, England. There are different preparations but all are made from oatmeal and bacon fat.

== Description ==
One recipe calls for a pound of oatmeal mixed with some bacon fat to create a dough the consistency of pastry. The dough is then shaped into a brick shape and baked, often with a strip of bacon on top. Another version consists of a dough of oatmeal and water pressed into a pie plate, topped with pieces of fat bacon, and baked. It was cut into wedges tart-style for serving

The throdkin could also be baked and then fried in bacon fat.

There is a sweet variety from Blackpool which incorporates currants.

== History ==
It is listed, with an earliest instance in 1837, by Joseph Wright in his 1905 The English Dialect Dictionary.

== See also ==
- British cuisine

== Other sources ==
- Kirk, Edward (3 January 1876), Manchester Guardian, quoted in Nodal, John Howard & Milner, George (1875) "A Glossary of the Lancashire Dialect", p.262, Manchester: Alexander Ireland & Co.
