= Chorley cake =

Currant-filled round shortcrust pastry

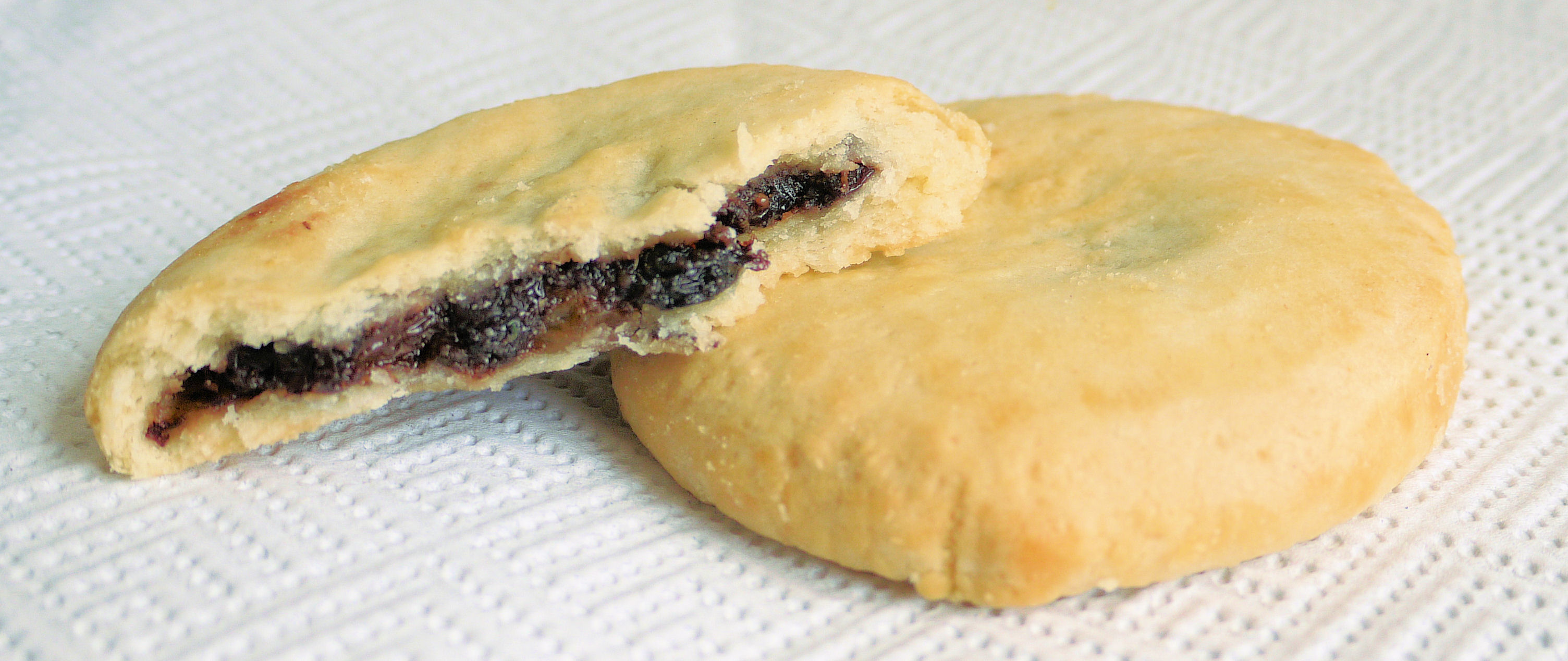
- Type: Pastry
- Place of origin: England
- Region or state: Chorley, Lancashire
- Main ingredients: Shortcrust pastry, raisins

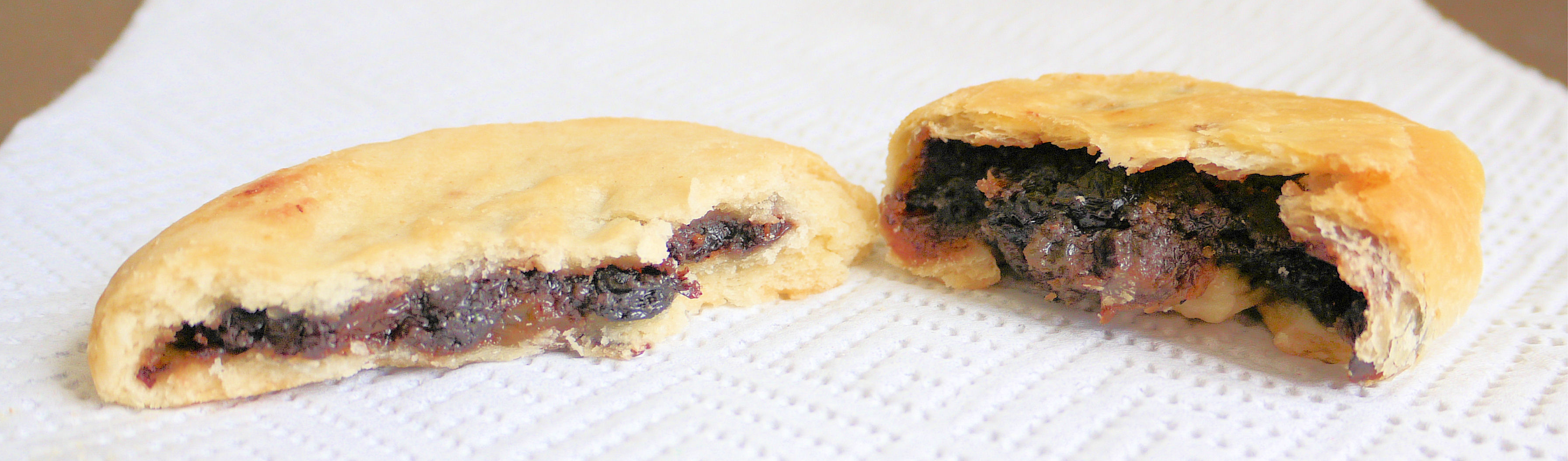
A Chorley cake (left) and an Eccles cake (right)

Chorley cakes are flattened, fruit filled pastry cakes, traditionally associated with the town of Chorley in Lancashire, England.

== Characteristics ==
A Chorley cake is made using currants, sandwiched between two layers of unsweetened shortcrust pastry which after baking is normally a deep brown in colour.

Chorley cakes are a close relative of the more widely known Eccles cake, but have some significant differences. An Eccles cake uses flaky puff pastry and the currants in the Eccles cake are often concentrated in the middle while in the Chorley cake the fruit is usually evenly distributed. The Chorley cake is significantly less sweet, and is commonly eaten with a light spread of butter on top, and sometimes a slice of Lancashire cheese on the side. It is not uncommon to see some sugar added to the fruit, or sweeter raisins or sultanas used. Locals often refer to Chorley cake as Fly Pie.

== Chorley cake Street Fair ==
The October "Chorley Cake Street Fair", restarted in 1995, promotes the cakes, with a competition for local bakers to produce the largest ever Chorley cake.

== Sad Cake ==
Also related to the Chorley cake is East Lancashire's "Sad Cake", made to a similar recipe. It was found in the Darwen, Blackburn, Accrington, Burnley, Colne, Nelson and Padiham areas and throughout the Rossendale area.

Sad cake is often up to 12 inches (30 cm) in diameter, as opposed to the Chorley cake being 3 to 5 inches (8 to 12 cm). It is made by rolling out the pastry and dropping raisins and/or currants evenly over it, then folding it in on several sides and rolling it out again to the required size. Sad cake is usually round but can be square.

It was then cut into triangular sections similar to a sponge cake section and was a regular addition in a working man's lunch box (the whole meal was known as bagging, snap or packing). The sad cake was a filler for eating either after one's sandwiches or as a separate tea break snack during the working day in the cotton mills and coal mines of Lancashire. A spread of margarine, butter or even jam was placed on top. It may be eaten with sandwiches of jam and crumbly soft Lancashire cheese.

== See also ==
- List of pastries
