= Green Hill (Lancashire) =

Mountain in Cowan Bridge, Lancashire, United Kingdom

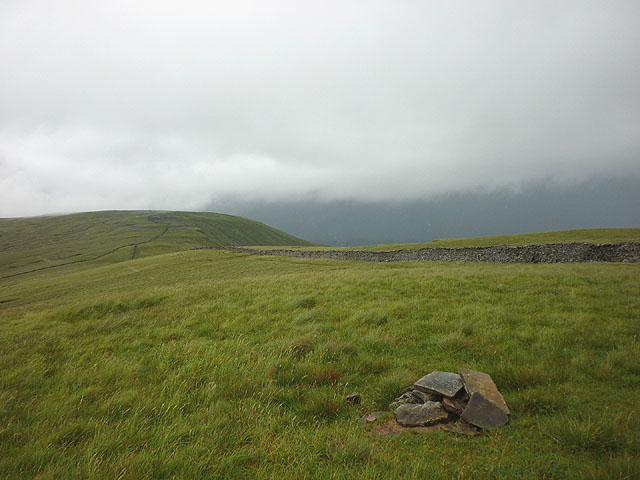
- Green Hill—the cairn marks the summit

Highest point
- Elevation: 628 m (2,060 ft)
- Prominence: 24m. (79 ft)
- Parent peak: Great Coum
- Listing: Nuttall, sub-Hewitt
- Coordinates: 54°13′59″N 2°27′28″W

Geography
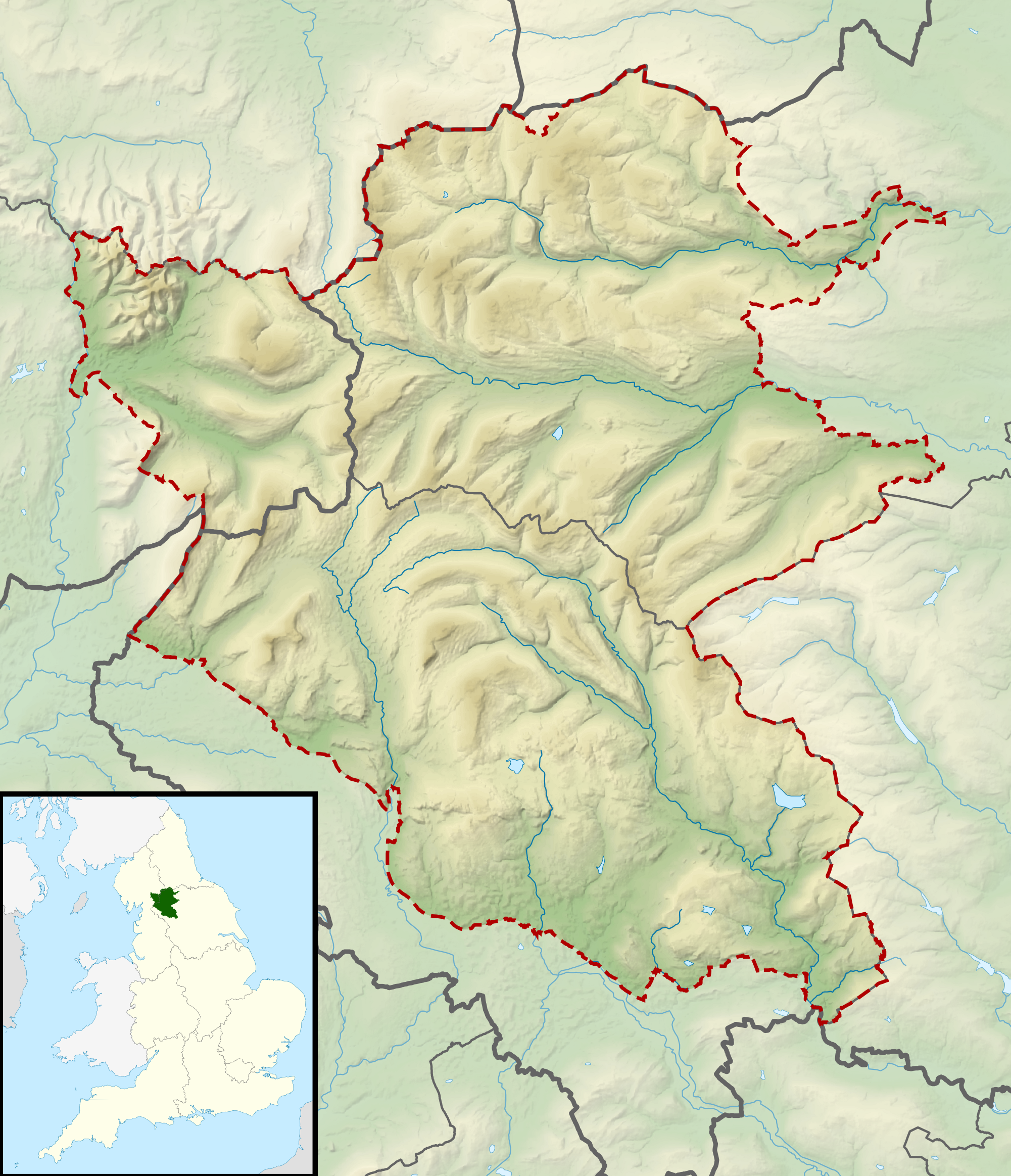
- Location within Yorkshire Dales Location within Lancashire Location within Cumbria Location within the City of Lancaster district
- Location: Lancashire-Cumbria, England
- OS grid: SD701820
- Topo map: OS Landranger 98

Green Hill is a mountain or fell in north west England. Its summit is 628 metres (2,060 ft) above sea level. It is located above Cowan Bridge, Lancashire, near Kirkby Lonsdale, Cumbria, and Ingleton, North Yorkshire. Its summit is about 4 kilometres (2 1/2 miles) almost due west of the summit of Whernside. It forms the watershed between the River Dee and the Leck Beck: both are tributaries of the River Lune.

== Geography ==
The highest point of the traditional county of Lancashire is Coniston Old Man, which, together with the rest of Furness became part of Cumbria in 1974. A walkers' guide cites Green Hill, 51 kilometres (32 mi) south of the Old Man, as the county top for Lancashire, lying on the border with Cumbria, and Ordnance Survey data record Green Hill as one metre higher than Gragareth, about 2 kilometres (1 mi) southwest of Green Hill. Gragareth's summit trig point, at 627 metres (2,057 ft), lies a couple of hundred metres within Lancashire.

Another county top close to Green Hill is Whernside, 736 metres (2,415 ft), the highest point in North Yorkshire.

The summit of Green Hill, although relatively dull in itself, provides many excellent views in all directions ranging from the Howgill Fells and Lakeland fells to the north, the Pennines in the east, and a majority of North Yorkshire to the south.

== County Stone ==
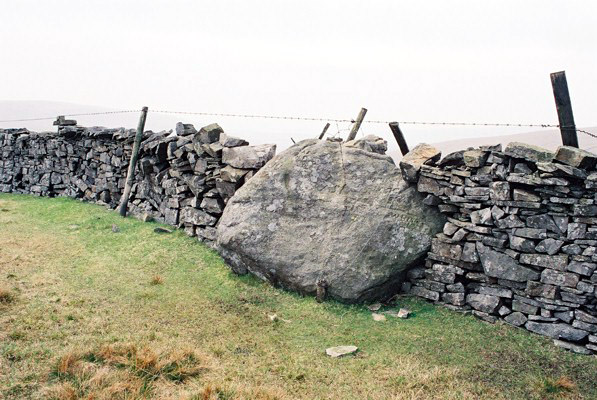
The County Stone

Near to the summit of Green Hill, lies the County Stone, a large glacial erratic boulder which marks the triple point where the traditional counties of Westmorland, Yorkshire and Lancashire borders converged.
