= Crag Hill (Yorkshire Dales) =

Peak in the Yorkshire Dales, England

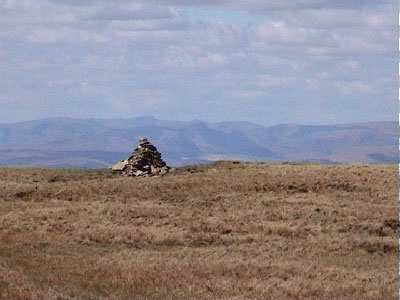
- The summit triangulation point with Mickle Fell in the background

Highest point
- Elevation: 682 m (2,238 ft)
- Coordinates: 54°14′40″N 2°28′27″W

Geography
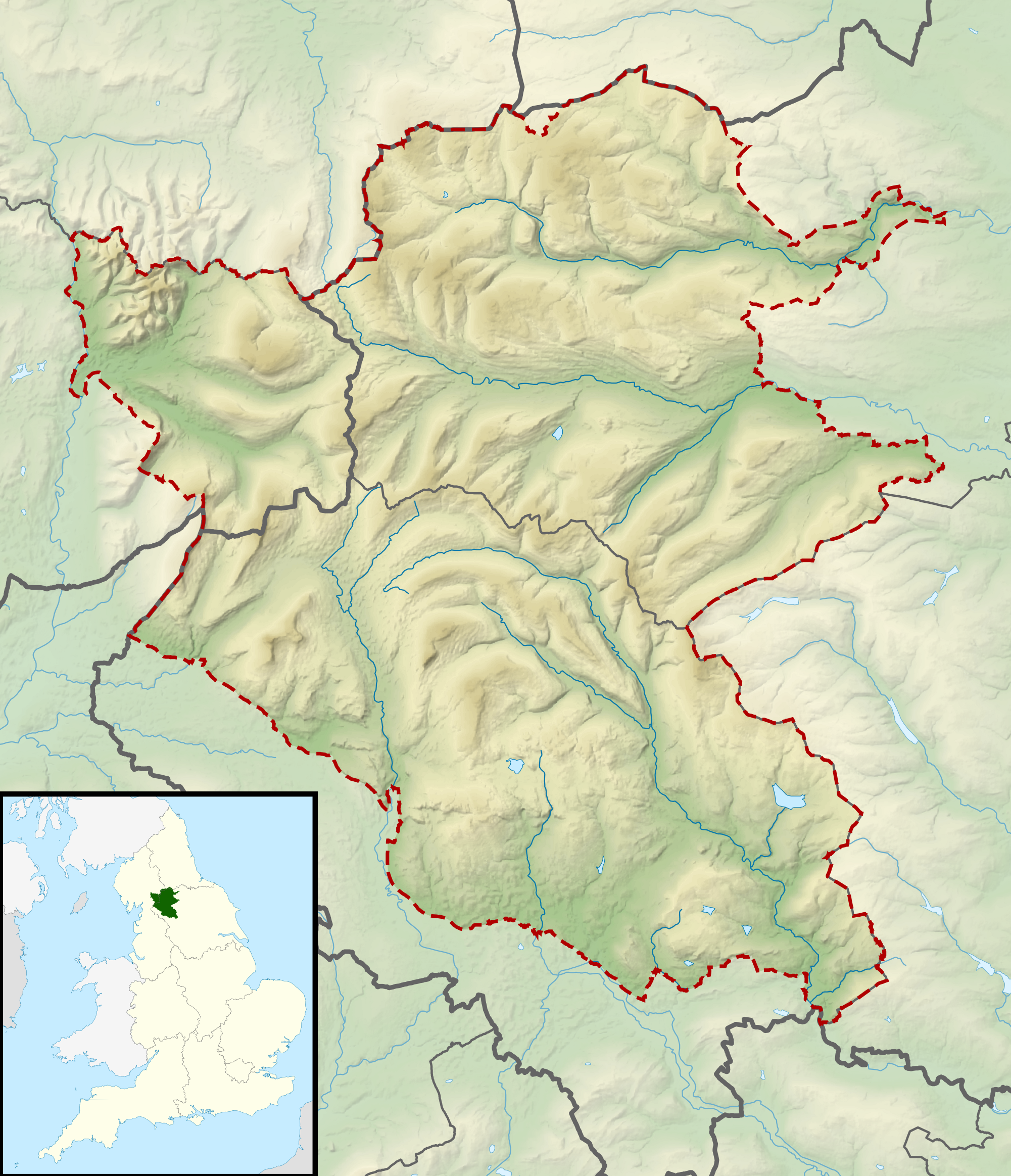
- Location within Yorkshire Dales Location within the former South Lakeland district
- Location: Yorkshire Dales/Cumbria, England
- OS grid: SD692833
- Topo map: OS Landranger 98

Crag Hill is on the western edge of the Yorkshire Dales in northern England, not to be confused with the higher Crag Hill elsewhere in the county of Cumbria. It lies on the boundary of the Yorkshire Dales national park, but its summit is in Westmorland and Furness, Cumbria. It is part of a ridge including the neighbouring fells of Great Coum and Gragareth. The summit of Crag Hill is about 0.62 miles (1 km) away from the top of Great Coum, the latter being the highest point on the ridge at 2,254 feet (687 m).

All three hills may be included in a single circular walk from High Moss near Whernside on the Ingleton to Dent road. The views are extensive, with panoramas of the Yorkshire Dales, Howgill Fells, the Pennines and the Lake District beyond.

The hill is listed as one of the waypoints in the Yorkshire Dales Top Ten (YDTT). This is a long-distance walking route that takes in the ten highest peaks in the Yorkshire Dales with a combined ascent of 22,000 feet (6,700 m).
