= Pendle Express =

- Type: Local Newspaper
- Format: Tabloid
- Owner(s): Johnston Press
- Political alignment: Centre
- Website: Leader Times Newspapers

The Pendle Express is a weekly newspaper published every Tuesday for readers in the borough of Pendle, East Lancashire, England. It is edited from offices of the Burnley Express, to coincide with the midweek edition of that newspaper.

Other sister newspapers are the Burnley Express, published every Tuesday and Friday, Padiham Express, published every Tuesday and Friday, Clitheroe Advertiser and Times, published every Thursday and Nelson Leader, Colne Times and Barnoldswick and Earby Times, all published every Friday. All of these titles are owned by Johnston Press, of Edinburgh.

In 2003, the Pendle Express had approximately 39,000 readers, incorporated with the Tuesday edition of the Burnley Express.
