= Clitheroe Advertiser and Times =

English newspaper

- Type: Local newspaper
- Format: Tabloid
- Owner: Johnston Press
- Political alignment: Centre
- Website: Leader Times Newspapers

The Clitheroe Advertiser and Times is a weekly newspaper published every Thursday for readers in the area of Clitheroe in the Ribble Valley, east Lancashire.

Its sister newspapers are the Burnley Express, published every Tuesday and Friday; Padiham Express, published every Tuesday and Friday; Pendle Express, published every Tuesday; and Colne Times, Nelson Leader and Barnoldswick and Earby Times, all published every Friday. All of these titles are owned by JPI Media of Edinburgh.

The Clitheroe Advertiser and Times also features news for other local villages in the area of Ribble Valley, besides Clitheroe itself.

In 2003, according to JICREG, the newspaper had a readership of approximately 26000 in the local postal code area.
