= Nelson Leader =

- Type: Local Newspaper
- Format: Tabloid
- Owner(s): Johnston Press
- Founded: 1900 (Nelson Leader)
- Headquarters: Editorial - Nelson. Sales - Burnley.
- Website: Leader Times Newspapers

The Nelson Leader is a weekly newspaper published every Friday for readers in the town of Nelson in Pendle, east Lancashire. England. It is edited from the 'Leader-Times' series of newspapers' offices in Nelson.

== Editorial variants ==
The other newspapers in the 'Leader-Times' series are: the Colne Times and Barnoldswick and Earby Times, all of which are published every Friday. Usually the first few pages of editorial in the various editions differ to target news for each area, with the rest the same.

The Nelson Leader was first published in 1900. The other local newspapers, the Colne Times and Barnoldswick and Earby Times also have a long history and were eventually largely incorporated into the Nelson Leader in the mid-1930s.

The Nelson Leader newspaper also features news for Barrowford, Brierfield, Reedley, Blacko, Higherford, Higham, Barley, Fence, Wheatley Lane and Roughlee.

The Colne Times newspaper features news for Colne, Trawden, Foulridge, Laneshaw Bridge, Wycoller and Cowling, Craven.

The Barnoldswick and Earby Times features news for Barnoldswick, Earby and villages in the West Craven area.

In 2003, according to JICREG, the newspapers had approximately 41000 readers in the Pendle area.

== Local stablemates ==
Other sister newspapers are the Burnley Express, published every Tuesday and Friday, Padiham Express, published every Tuesday and Friday, Clitheroe Advertiser and Times, published every Thursday and the Pendle Express, published every Tuesday. All of these titles are owned by Johnston Press, of Edinburgh.
