= List of counties of England by population in 1971 =

This is a list of counties of England, ordered by population as at the 1971 census. The figures presented here include all the administrative counties with their associated county boroughs. York is accounted for as part of the West Riding, and Lincoln as part of Kesteven.

| Rank | County | Total population |
|---|---|---|
| 1 | Greater London | 7,452,343 |
| 2 | Lancashire | 5,118,405 |
| 3 | Yorkshire, West Riding | 3,785,013 |
| 4 | Warwickshire | 2,082,230 |
| 5 | Staffordshire | 1,858,348 |
| 6 | Hampshire | 1,565,476 |
| 7 | Cheshire | 1,546,397 |
| 8 | Durham | 1,409,633 |
| 9 | Kent | 1,399,471 |
| 10 | Essex | 1,358,020 |
| 11 | Gloucestershire | 1,076,710 |
| 12 | Surrey | 1,002,892 |
| 13 | Nottinghamshire | 976,403 |
| 14 | Hertfordshire | 924,641 |
| 15 | Devon | 898,409 |
| 16 | Derbyshire | 885,130 |
| 17 | Northumberland | 795,754 |
| 18 | Leicestershire | 772,103 |
| 19 | Sussex, East | 747,976 |
| 20 | Yorkshire, North Riding | 725,656 |
| 21 | Worcestershire | 693,251 |
| 22 | Somerset | 682,665 |
| 23 | Berkshire | 636,860 |
| 24 | Norfolk | 617,621 |
| 25 | Buckinghamshire | 587,556 |
| 26 | Yorkshire, East Riding | 543,309 |
| 27 | Sussex, West | 492,500 |
| 28 | Wiltshire | 486,755 |
| 29 | Lincolnshire, Parts of Lindsey | 470,905 |
| 30 | Northamptonshire | 468,625 |
| 31 | Bedfordshire | 464,286 |
| 32 | Cornwall | 381,665 |
| 33 | Oxfordshire | 381,584 |
| 34 | Suffolk, East | 381,464 |
| 35 | Dorset | 361,925 |
| 36 | Shropshire | 337,104 |
| 37 | Cambridgeshire and Isle of Ely | 303,042 |
| 38 | Cumberland | 292,187 |
| 39 | Lincolnshire, Parts of Kesteven | 232,549 |
| 40 | Huntingdon and Peterborough | 202,622 |
| 41 | Suffolk, West | 164,732 |
| 42 | Herefordshire | 138,638 |
| 43 | Isle of Wight | 109,515 |
| 44 | Lincolnshire, Parts of Holland | 105,685 |
| 45 | Westmorland | 72,837 |
| 46 | Rutland | 27,471 |
| TOTAL | | 46,018,363 |
