= Great Coum =

Hill in Cumbria, England

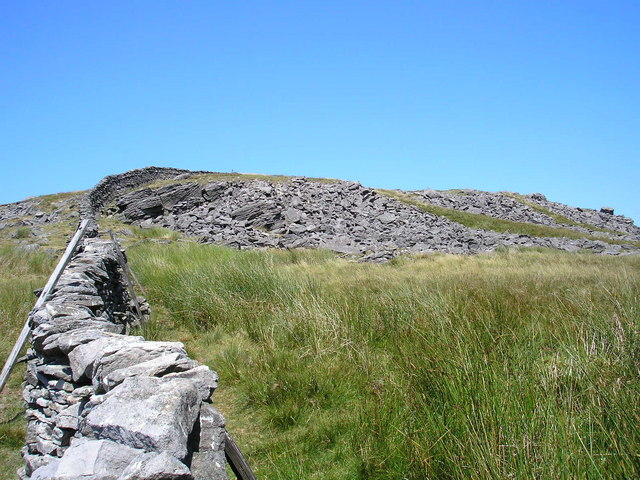
- Looking north along the boundary wall towards the rocky outcrop below the summit

Highest point
- Elevation: 687 m (2,254 ft)
- Prominence: 221 m (725 ft)
- Parent peak: Whernside
- Listing: Marilyn, Hewitt, Nuttall, HuMP, Simm, Buxton & Lewis, Bridge, Clem
- Coordinates: 54°14′48″N 2°27′39″W

Geography
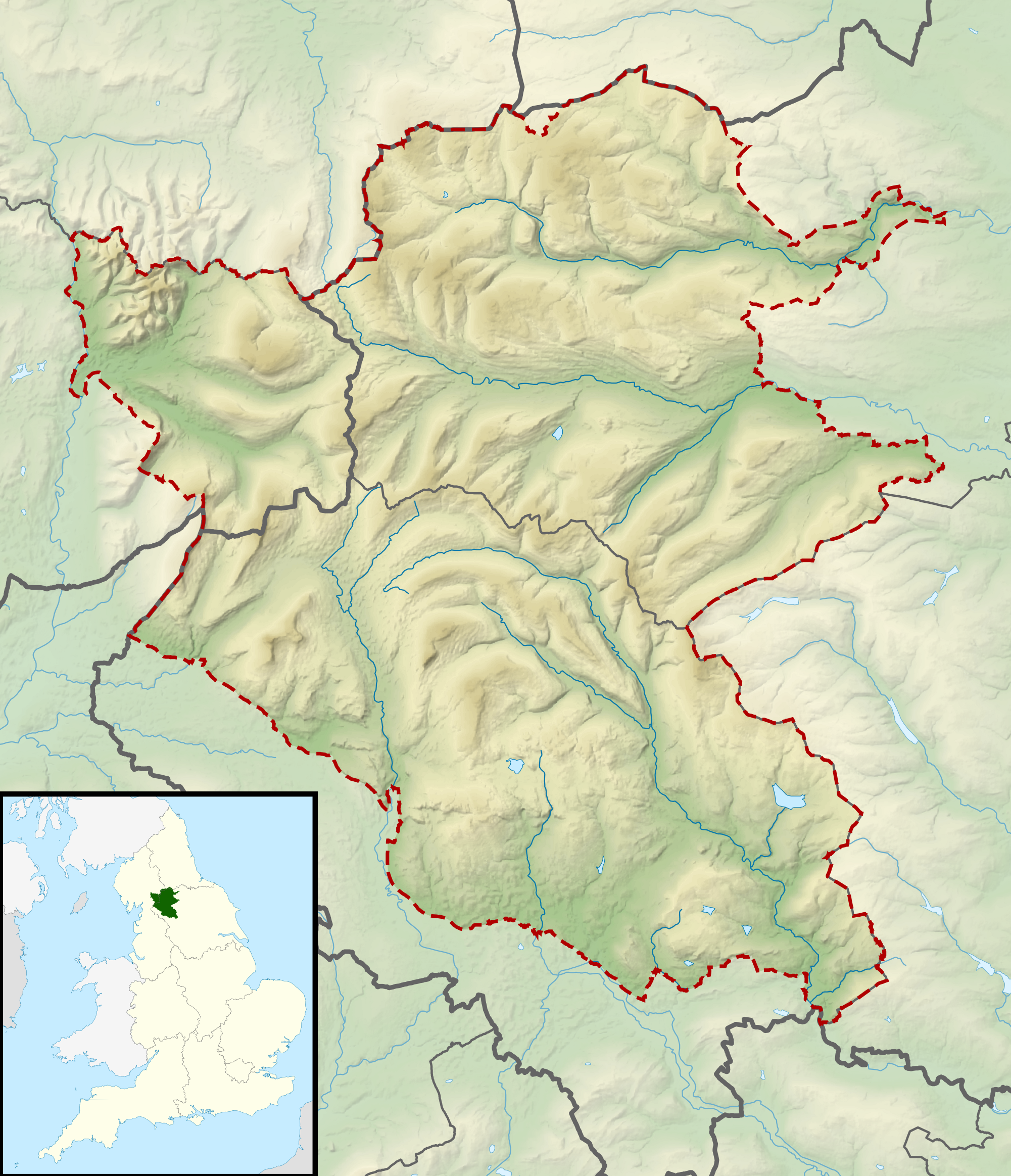
- Location within Yorkshire Dales
- Location: Yorkshire Dales National Park, Cumbria, England
- OS grid: SD700835
- Topo map: OS Outdoor Leisure 2

Great Coum is a hill in the Yorkshire Dales, but is located in Westmorland and Furness, Cumbria. The highest point is in Dent parish, but the boundary with Casterton parish crosses the summit. Its neighbours include Crag Hill, Green Hill and Gragareth.

It can be ascended from Dent to the north or by a shorter route, of about 2 1/2 miles (4 kilometres) with 700 feet (210 metres) of ascent, from the minor road to White Shaw Moss (SD723821).

Great Coum is classified as a Marilyn, Hewitt, Nuttall, HuMP, Simm, Buxton & Lewis, Bridge and Clem.
