= Lancashire cheese =

English cheese

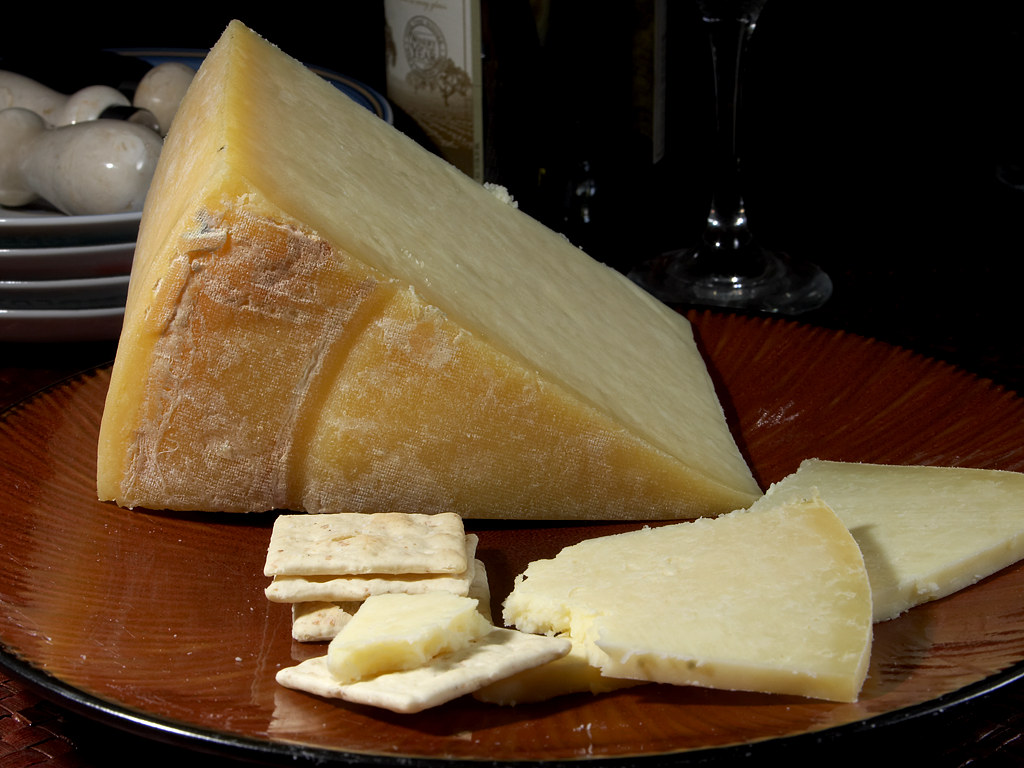
- Country of origin: England
- Region: Lancashire
- Source of milk: Cows
- Pasteurised: Depends on variety
- Texture: Hard, creamy to crumbly
- Aging time: 1–24 months
- Certification: Beacon Fell Traditional Lancashire Cheese only: PDO
- Named after: Lancashire[*]

Lancashire is an English cow's-milk cheese from the county of Lancashire. There are three distinct varieties of Lancashire cheese. Young Creamy Lancashire and mature Tasty Lancashire are produced by a traditional method, whereas Crumbly Lancashire (more commonly known as Lancashire Crumbly within Lancashire) is a more recent creation suitable for mass production.

It is traditionally paired with Eccles cakes and Chorley cakes.

== Creamy Lancashire ==
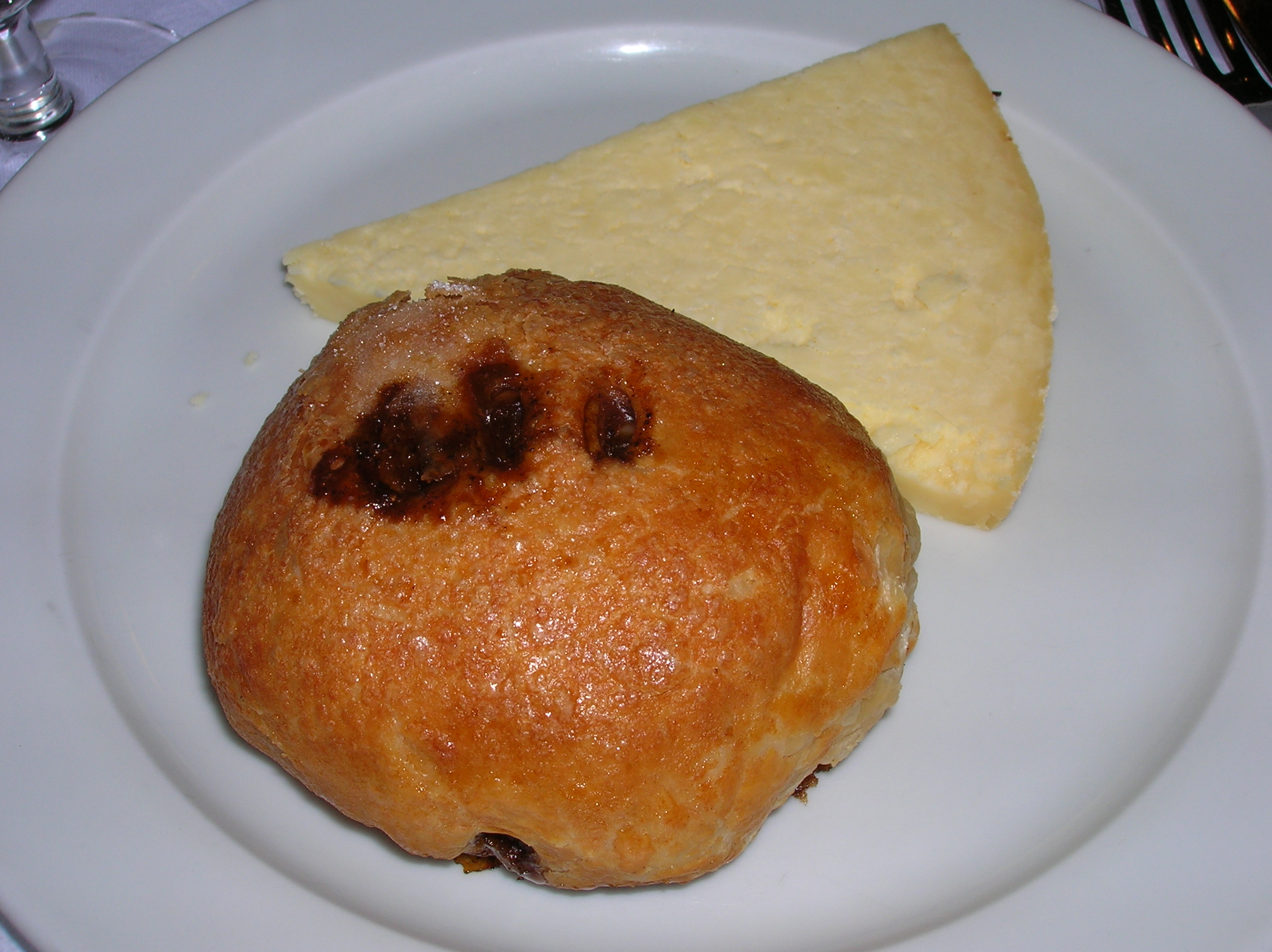
Eccles cake and Lancashire cheese at a restaurant

For centuries, Lancashire dairy farmers' wives made cheese from surplus milk. On small farms there was insufficient milk from a single day to make a cheese, and so each day's milk was curdled and accumulated for several days until there was enough curd to make a cheese. Uniquely amongst all British cheeses, two or three days' curd of varying maturity are blended together, giving Lancashire cheese a distinctive character. The traditional method was standardised in the 1890s by Joseph Gornall of Garstang and Pilling, a county council employee, who visited many Lancashire farms to establish a method and recipe that is still used today – the "Gornall method". His "Gornall Patent Cheesemaker" was sold between 1892 and 1919.

Creamy Lancashire cheese is made by this traditional method and matured for a period of four to twelve weeks. It has a fluffy texture and creamy flavour, and is good for toasting, as it does not become stringy when melted.

Beacon Fell Traditional Lancashire Cheese is a protected designation of origin (PDO) name. The name can be used only for cheese made with milk from an area north of the River Ribble including the Fylde, Preston, and Blackpool and made in the same area by a designated method. The verbatim PDO-registered name is "Beacon Fell Traditional Lancashire Cheese". It is named after Beacon Fell within the designated area.

== Tasty Lancashire ==
Tasty Lancashire cheese is made by the same traditional method as Creamy Lancashire, but is matured for longer, from 12 weeks to 24 months. It has a mature nutty taste.

Leigh cheese was a version of Lancashire cheese that ceased production in the 19th century.

== Crumbly Lancashire ==
In the 1950s, Crumbly Lancashire cheese was created. Unlike the other Lancashire varieties, this is made from a single day's milk and resembles other crumbly cheeses such as Cheshire and Wensleydale. It is the only Lancashire cheese that is produced outside the county of Lancashire. It tends to be matured for only 6–8 weeks, resulting in a crumbly, fresh, high-acid cheese.

== See also ==
- List of British cheeses
- List of cheeses
