= Burnley Express =

Newspaper for Burnley and Padiham, England

- Type: Local newspaper
- Format: Tabloid
- Owner: National World
- Editor: John Deehan
- Founded: 1877
- Political alignment: Centre
- Headquarters: 104, Empire Business Park, Off Liverpool Road, Burnley, BB12 6HH
- Circulation: 1,766 (as of 2023)
- Website: burnleyexpress.net

The Burnley Express is a newspaper for Burnley and Padiham, England and surrounding area. It is printed twice weekly, on Tuesday and Friday, which is the larger edition. In print since 1877, it is now part of the group National World. One variant is the Padiham Express, with the first few pages being specific to Padiham. Much of the content is also available, on the website of the newspaper.

== History ==
The newspaper was founded as the Burnley Express and East Lancashire Observer, by printer George Frankland, from Preston, as an eight-page penny weekly. It was politically Conservative. It merged with the Burnley Advertiser in 1880, becoming the Burnley Express and Advertiser, and in 1886, it became the Burnley Express and Clitheroe Division Advertiser.

It became the Express and News, after merging with the liberal Burnley News, in 1933. Historical copies of the Burnley Express, dating back to 1877, are available to search and view in digitised form, at the British Newspaper Archive.

The newspaper's headquarters were for many years located in Burnley Town Centre with its printworks on Bull Street on the corner with Manchester Road.

== Readership ==
According to JICREG in 2003, the newspapers had approximately 50,000 readers for the editions on Friday, and 39,000 for the editions on Tuesday.

== Sister papers ==
Sister papers are the Nelson Leader, Colne Times and Barnoldswick and Earby Times, published Friday; The Clitheroe Advertiser and Times, published Thursday; and the Pendle Express, a variant of Tuesday's Burnley Express, published Tuesday. All these titles are owned by Johnston Press, Edinburgh.
