= Stephen Atkinson =

Stephen Atkinson may refer to:

- Steve Atkinson (1948–2003), Canadian ice hockey player
- Steve Atkinson (cricketer) (born 1952), English-born cricketer
- Stephen Atkinson (metallurgist) (fl. 1586–1619), English metallurgist
- Stephen Atkinson (politician) (born 1969), British politician
- Steven Atkinson (born 1984), British director and producer
