= Jenny Mein =

British politician

Leader of Lancashire County Council
- In office 23 May 2013 – 25 May 2017
- Preceded by: Geoff Driver
- Succeeded by: Geoff Driver

Member of Lancashire County Council
- In office 4 June 2009 – 6 May 2025
- Preceded by: Dorothy Mein
- Succeeded by: Almas Razakazi
- Ward: Preston South East

Personal details
- Party: Labour Co-Op

Jennifer Mein is a British Labour Co-operative politician who was the leader of Lancashire County Council from 2013 to 2017.

== Political career ==
Mein was first elected as a Labour councillor to the Preston South East ward in the 2009 Lancashire County Council election.

In the 2013 Lancashire County Council elections, Mein retained her seat, and was appointed as Leader of the Lancashire County Council in a Labour/Liberal Democrat coalition. During her time as leader, she spoke out against funding problems in the authority. Following a review which claimed LCC's reserves would be gone by April 2019, Mein told the press "We have got to look at further ways to save money or increase our income... We are eating into our reserves now... it won't be long before they are gone."

Mein was replaced as council leader by Geoff Driver following the 2017 Lancashire County Council elections, due to the Conservative victory, yet held maintained her seat. She went on to successfully defended her seat in the 2021 Lancashire County Council election.

As part of her campaign in the 2025 Lancashire County Council elections, Mein blamed the incumbent Conservative administration in the council for local issues, particularly in regards to infrastructure. Mein stated:

"The roads are full of potholes, the drains are blocked, the lighting is not being repaired when it needs to be. We need to get rid of the Tories in County Hall."

Mein lost her Preston South West seat to Almas Razakazi, an independent candidate who ran on an anti-austerity, pro-Palestine campaign. She placed 3rd in the contest, receiving 27.73% of the popular vote.
