= County Hall, Preston =

County building in Preston, Lancashire, England

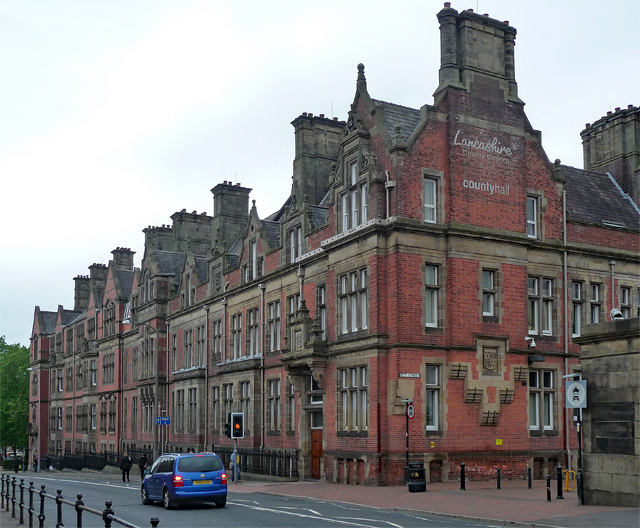
- County Hall

- Location in Preston city centre Location in Lancashire

General information
- Architectural style: Queen Anne revival style
- Location: Fishergate, Preston, Lancashire, Preston, England
- Coordinates: 53.7575°N 2.7091°W
- Completed: 1882; 144 years ago

Design and construction
- Architect: Henry Littler

County Hall is a municipal building in Fishergate, Preston, Lancashire, England. It is the headquarters of Lancashire County Council.

== History ==
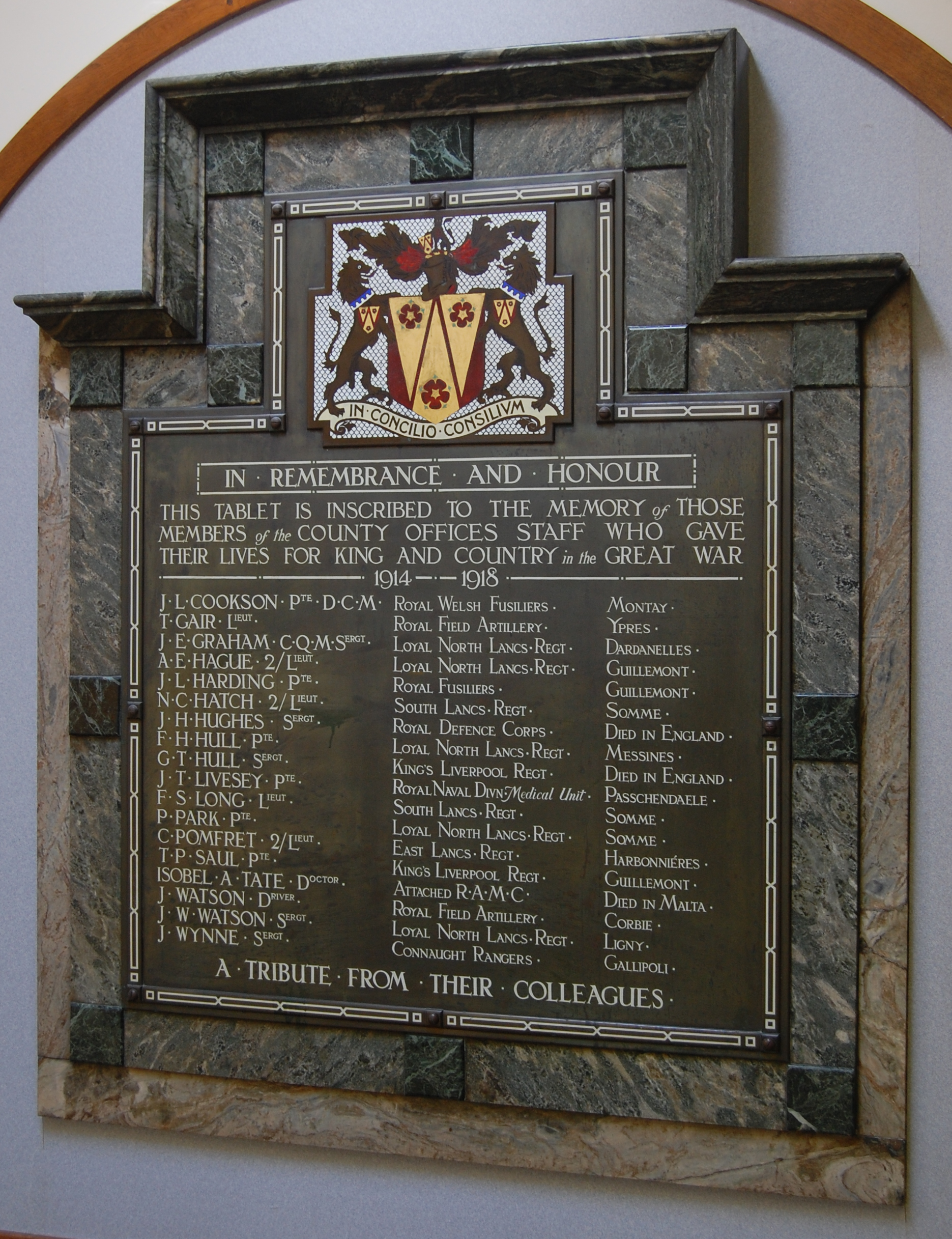
The war memorial

In July 1877, county leaders identified the need for enlarged accommodation for the county court, which had been based in the Sessions House in Stanley Street, as well as the need for additional offices. They decided to procure a new building and selected a site at Fishergate which had previously been occupied by a row of residential properties.

The new building, which was designed by the Manchester architect, Henry Littler, in the Queen Anne revival style, opened on 14 September 1882. The design involved an asymmetrical main frontage with seven bays facing Fishergate; the right hand section, which slightly projected forwards, featured a doorway with a rectangular fanlight and shield above: the principal room was the council chamber. The new building incorporated a new headquarters for the Lancashire Constabulary as well as a county records office, formed to preserve important documents.

Following the implementation of the Local Government Act 1888, which established county councils in every county, the building also became the offices and meeting place for Lancashire County Council. An extension to the west along Fishergate was completed in 1903: this involved the demolition of a street known as Jordan Street whose residents had included the astronomer Moses Holden. A further extension to the north along Pitt Street, with a substantial new structure and entrance, was completed in 1934.

As part of a two-day visit to Lancashire, King George VI and Queen Elizabeth attended a lunch hosted by the Lord Lieutenant of Lancashire, Lord Derby, at County Hall before departing for Preston Town Hall in March 1945 during the Second World War.

In 2011, as part of a cost-cutting initiative, several hundred staff were relocated to the County Hall from other locations.

== War memorial ==
Inside the building is a memorial, unveiled in 1921, to eighteen "members of the county offices staff who gave their lives for King and Country in the Great War", including one woman, Isobel Addey Tate.
