= Isobel Addey Tate =

Irish doctor

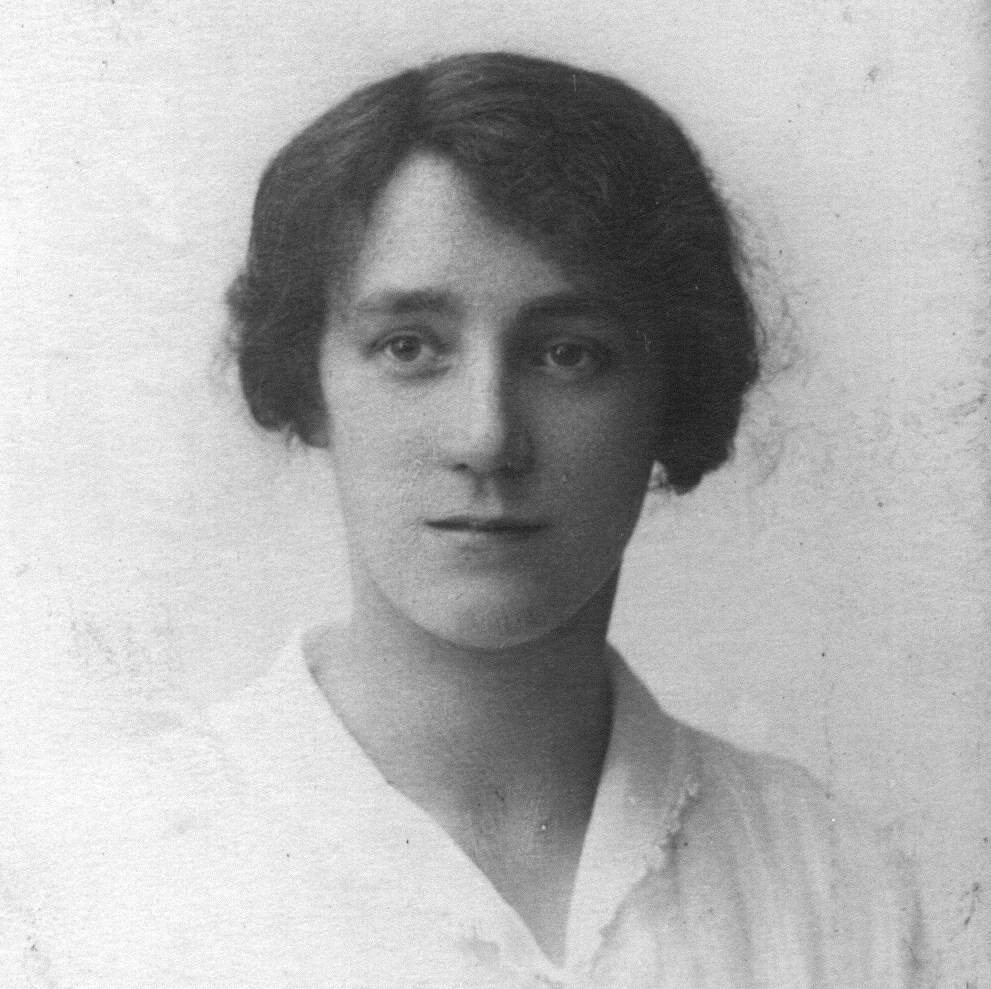
- Born: 1 May 1875; Portadown, Ireland
- Died: 28 January 1917 (aged 41); Malta
- Other name: Isobel Addey Tate
- Education: Queen's University Belfast
- Occupation: Doctor
- Known for: Serving in World War I

Isobel Addey Tate (1 May 1875 – 28 January 1917) was an Irish medical doctor who served overseas and was the only woman to be included in the Queen's University Belfast Roll of Honour and War memorial for her services in World War I.

== Early life and career ==
Tate was born to John Tate and Isabella Cherry on 1 May 1875 in Portadown, a merchant and Methodist family. She completed her matriculation at Queen's College Belfast about 1893 and graduated with a medical degree in 1899. She registered with the General Medical Council of Ireland on 8 September 1899. However she then moved to Beverley, east Yorkshire where she continued to train as a doctor gaining her Doctorate in Medicine in 1902. Her next job was as resident physician at Hailey sanatorium near Oxford. She continued her education getting her Diploma in Public Health from Victoria University Manchester in 1904. This lead her to her next position as resident medical officer at Burnley Union Infirmary. From there she worked in Shropshire in 1908 as Medical Inspector of school children and then Preston as a School Medical Inspector in 1911.

== The War ==
After the outbreak of World War I Tate joined The Serbian Relief Fund which created dispensaries in Serbia to treat the local population. Tate was in charge of the x-ray department in Serbia. The groups were forced to evacuate as the war closed in on the areas where they were based. Diseases where rife and some, including Tate, fell ill to typhoid and were sent back to Britain. There she worked in Graylingwell Hospital which was also requisitioned as a military hospital dealing with men sent back from the front. In 1916 Tate volunteered for service with the Royal Army Medical Corps and left for Malta on 24 August 1916. She worked in the military hospitals there but on 28 January 1917 she died at Victoria Junction, Sliema, Malta.

== Memorials ==
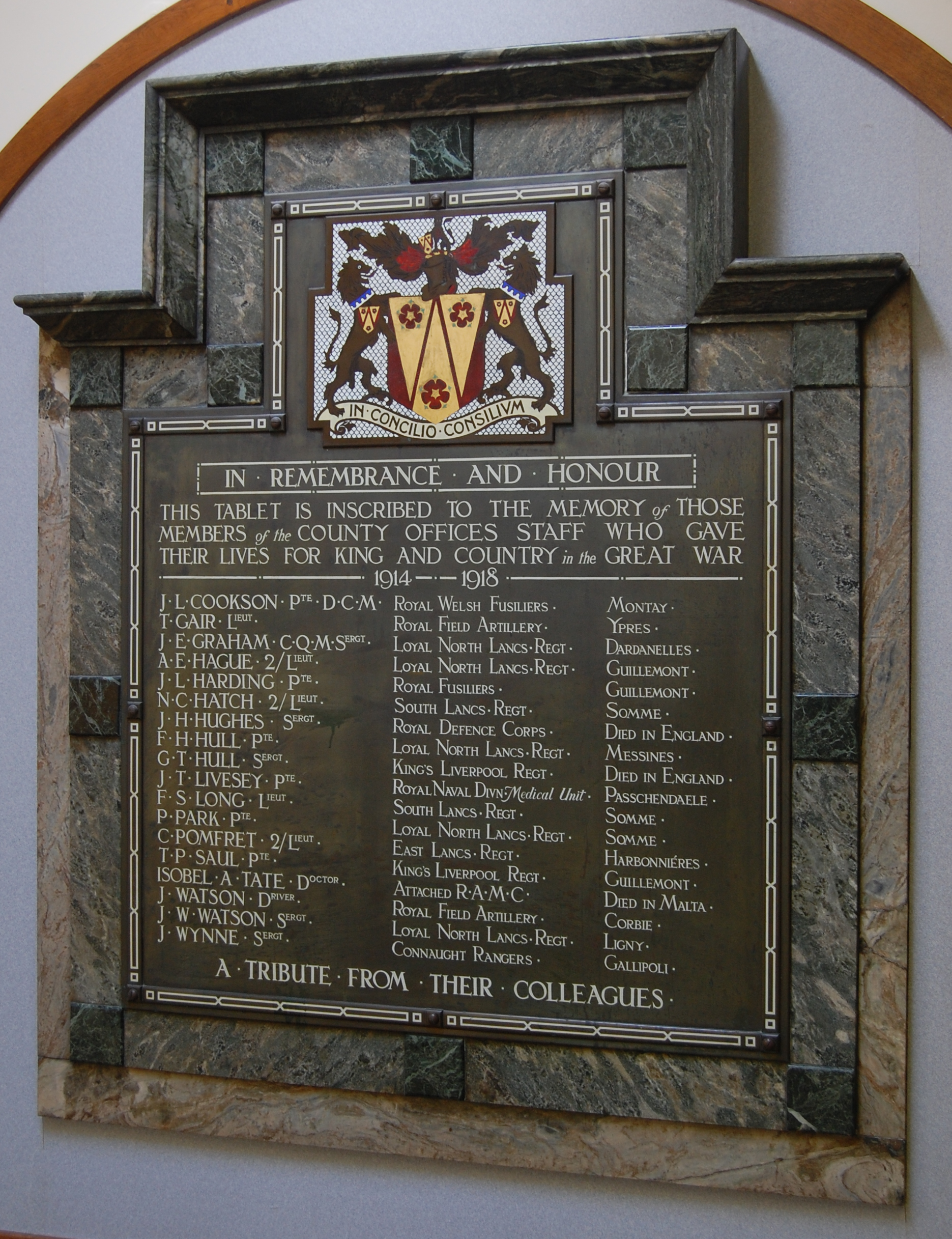
Memorial at County Hall, Preston, including Tate's name

The inscription on her grave in Pieta, Malta reads:

In memory of Isobel Addy Tate, MD, DPH, attached Royal Army Medical Corps who died 28th January 1917 while working for the sick and wounded at Valletta Military Hospital.

Her name is also included on a memorial to members of Lancashire County Offices staff "who gave their lives for King and Country in the Great War", at County Hall, Preston.
