= 2021 Lancashire County Council election =

- 6 May 2021

All 84 seats to Lancashire County Council 43 seats needed for a majority
	First party	Second party
Leader	Geoff Driver	Azhar Ali
Party	Conservative	Labour
Last election	46	30
Seats before	44	30
Seats won	48	32
Seat change	▲2	▲2
Popular vote	147,640	117,062
Percentage	43.92%	34.82%
Swing	▼1.2%	▼0.57%
	Third party	Fourth party
Party	Liberal Democrats	Green
Last election	4	1
Seats before	4	1
Seats won	2	2
Seat change	▼2	▲1
Popular vote	30,605	21,015
Percentage	9.10%	6.25%
Swing	▼0.37%	▲2.85%
- Map showing the results of the 2021 Lancashire County Council election.
Council control before election
Conservative Majority
Conservative
Council control after election
Conservative Majority
Conservative

An election to Lancashire County Council took place on 6 May 2021, with counting on 8 May, as part of the 2021 United Kingdom local elections. All 84 councillors are elected from electoral divisions for a four-year term of office. The system of voting used is first-past-the-post. Elections are held in all electoral divisions across the present ceremonial county, excepting Blackpool and Blackburn with Darwen which are unitary authorities. (Note: All locally registered electors (British, Irish, Commonwealth and European Union citizens) who are aged 18 or over may vote in the local elections. Those who were temporarily away from their ordinary address (for example, away working, on holiday, in student accommodation or in hospital) are also entitled to vote in the local elections.)

== Council composition ==
Prior to the election the composition of the council was:

- Conservative Party: 44
- Labour Party: 30
- Liberal Democrats: 4
- Independent: 4
- Green: 1
- Vacant: 1

== Electoral divisions ==
Boundary revisions by the Local Government Boundary Commission for England meant these elections were fought on new divisions, since 2017.

== Summary of candidates ==
	Burnley	Chorley	Fylde	Hyndburn	Lancaster	Pendle	Preston	Ribble Valley	Rossendale	South Ribble	West Lancashire	Wyre	Total
Conservative	6	8	6	6	10	6	9	4	5	8	8	8	84
Labour	6	8	6	6	10	5	9	4	5	8	8	8	83
Liberal Democrats	6	4	5	2	9	6	9	4	0	8	8	8	69
Independent	0	1	4	1	4	0	2	2	2	0	0	2	18
Green	6	8	2	6	10	3	0	4	3	3	2	7	54
Reform	0	0	0	3	0	0	0	0	0	0	0	1	4
BAPIP	3	0	0	0	0	0	0	0	0	0	0	0	3
OWL	0	0	0	0	0	0	0	0	0	0	2	0	2

Notes

- In Hyndburn, one candidate stands for UK Independence Party
- In Preston, one candidate stands for the Heritage Party
- In Rossendale, one candidate stands for Community First
- In South Ribble, one candidate stands for the For Britain Movement
- In West Lancashire, three candidates stand for Skelmersdale Independents and one for Workers' Party of Britain
- In Wyre, one candidate stands for the Social Democratic Party

== Results summary ==
Party	Councillors				Votes		
Party		Of total	Net			Of total	Net
Conservative Party	48	57.1%	+2	48 / 84	147,640	43.9%	-1.2%
Labour Party	32	38.1%	-2	32 / 84	117,062	34.8%	-0.6%
Liberal Democrats	2	2.4%	-2	2 / 84	30,605	9.1%	-0.4%
Green	2	2.4%	+1	2 / 84	21,015	6.3%	+2.9%
Independent	0	0.0%	-2	0 / 84	11,475	3.4%	+1.0%
Our West Lancashire	0	0.0%	0	0 / 84	2,814	0.8%	+0.3%
Skelmersdale Independents	0	0.0%	0	0 / 84	1,617	0.5%	+0.5%
BAPIP	0	0.0%	0	0 / 84	1,577	0.5%	+0.5%
Community First	0	0.0%	0	0 / 84	980	0.3%	+0.3%
Reform UK	0	0.0%	0	0 / 84	978	0.3%	+0.3%
UKIP	0	0.0%	-1	0 / 84	154	0.1%	-2.9%
Heritage Party	0	0.0%	0	0 / 84	116	0.0%	0%
For Britain	0	0.0%	0	0 / 84	55	0.0%	0%
Workers Party of Britain	0	0.0%	0	0 / 84	49	0.0%	0%
SDP	0	0.0%	0	0 / 84	45	0.0%	0%

== Seat summaries by district ==
Results summary for divisions in Burnley
Seat	Result	Majority
Burnley Central East	Labour hold	1,151
Burnley Central West	Green GAIN from Labour	251
Burnley North East	Labour hold	1,242
Burnley Rural	Conservative hold	606
Burnley South West	Labour GAIN from Liberal Democrats	5
Padiham & Burnley West	Conservative GAIN from UKIP	1,380

Results summary for divisions in Chorley
Seat	Result	Majority
Chorley Central	Labour hold	970
Chorley North	Labour hold	909
Chorley Rural East	Labour hold	2,484
Chorley Rural West	Conservative hold	350
Chorley South	Labour hold	1,165
Clayton with Whittle	Labour GAIN from Conservative	218
Euxton, Buckshaw & Astley	Conservative hold	843
Hoghton with Wheelton	Conservative hold	404

Results summary for divisions in Fylde
Seat	Result	Majority
Fylde East	Conservative GAIN from Independent	150
Fylde South	Conservative hold	1,328
Fylde West	Conservative GAIN from Independent	1,880
Lytham	Conservative hold	181
St Annes North	Conservative hold	1,332
St Annes South	Conservative hold	1,511

Results summary for divisions in Hyndburn
Seat	Result	Majority
Accrington North	Labour hold	589
Accrington South	Conservative GAIN from Labour	213
Accrington West & Oswaldtwistle Central	Labour hold	200
Great Harwood, Rishton & Clayton-le-Moors (2-member division)	Labour hold	N/A
Great Harwood, Rishton & Clayton-le-Moors (2-member division)	Conservative GAIN from Labour	N/A
Oswaldtwistle	Conservative hold	668

Results summary for divisions in Lancaster
Seat	Result	Majority
Heysham	Conservative hold	140
Lancaster Central	Green hold	1,676
Lancaster East	Labour hold	228
Lancaster Rural East	Conservative hold	860
Lancaster Rural North	Conservative hold	1,166
Lancaster South East	Labour hold	916
Morecambe Central	Labour hold	3
Morecambe North	Conservative hold	1,187
Morecambe South	Conservative hold	376
Skerton	Labour hold	478

Results summary for divisions in Pendle
Seat	Result	Majority
Brierfield & Nelson West	Labour hold	1,276
Nelson East	Labour hold	1,052
Pendle Central	Conservative hold	767
Pendle Hill	Conservative hold	1,319
Pendle Rural (2-member division)	Conservative GAIN from Liberal Democrats	N/A
Pendle Rural (2-member division)	Conservative hold	N/A

Results summary for divisions in Preston
Seat	Result	Majority
Preston Central East	Labour hold	1,971
Preston Central West	Labour hold	813
Preston City	Labour hold	1,445
Preston East	Labour hold	359
Preston North	Conservative hold	880
Preston Rural	Conservative hold	1,838
Preston South East	Labour hold	1,159
Preston South West	Labour hold	394
Preston West	Liberal Democrats hold	136

Results summary for divisions in Ribble Valley
Seat	Result	Majority
Clitheroe	Conservative hold	12
Longridge with Bowland	Conservative hold	1,624
Ribble Valley North East	Conservative hold	1,686
Ribble Valley South West	Conservative hold	2,241

Results summary for divisions in Rossendale
Seat	Result	Majority
Mid Rossendale	Labour GAIN from Conservative	60
Rossendale East	Labour GAIN from Conservative	535
Rossendale South	Conservative hold	334
Rossendale West	Labour GAIN from Conservative	77
Whitworth & Bacup	Conservative hold	60

Results summary for divisions in South Ribble
Seat	Result	Majority
Leyland Central	Labour hold	583
Leyland South	Conservative hold	250
Lostock Hall & Bamber Bridge	Conservative hold	274
Moss Side & Farington	Conservative hold	1,120
Penwortham East & Walton-le-Dale	Conservative hold	390
Penwortham West	Liberal Democrats hold	1,092
South Ribble East	Conservative hold	1,042
South Ribble West	Conservative hold	2,017

Results summary for divisions in West Lancashire
Seat	Result	Majority
Burscough & Rufford	Conservative hold	352
Ormskirk	Labour hold	602
Skelmersdale Central	Labour hold	1,376
Skelmersdale East	Labour hold	367
Skelmersdale West	Labour hold	1,358
West Lancashire East	Conservative hold	431
West Lancashire North	Conservative hold	1,788
West Lancashire West	Conservative hold	949

Results summary for divisions in Wyre
Seat	Result	Majority
Cleveleys East	Conservative hold	1,525
Cleveleys South & Carleton	Conservative hold	1,152
Fleetwood East	Labour hold	871
Fleetwood West & Cleveleys West	Conservative hold	740
Poulton-le-Fylde	Conservative hold	2,078
Thornton & Hambleton	Conservative hold	1,797
Wyre Rural Central	Conservative hold	1,773
Wyre Rural East	Conservative hold	2,469

== Results by division ==
=== Burnley ===
Burnley district summary
Party	Seats	+/-	Votes	%	+/-
Labour	3	Steady	6,899	30.3	–4.7
Conservative	2	▲1	7,172	31.5	+8.7
Green	1	▲1	3,293	14.5	+9.9
Liberal Democrats	0	▼1	3,809	16.7	–8.2
BAPIP	0	Steady	1,577	6.9	N/A
UKIP	0	▼1	N/A	N/A	–8.9
Total	6	Steady	22,750		

Division results

Burnley Central East
Party	Candidate	Votes	%	±%
Labour	Sobia Malik	1,854	49.35	
Conservative	Claire Ingham	703	18.71	
Green	Andy Wight	579	15.41	
Liberal Democrats	Mohammed Haji-Nazrul	561	14.93	
Majority		1,151	30.64	
Labour hold		Swing		

Burnley Central West
Party	Candidate	Votes	%	±%
Green	Andy Fewings	1,081	30.96	
Conservative	Don Whitaker	830	23.77	
BAPIP	Emma Payne	613	17.55	
Labour	Tony Martin	535	15.32	
Liberal Democrats	Gordon Birtwistle	386	11.05	
Majority		251	7.19	
Green gain from Labour		Swing		

Burnley North East
Party	Candidate	Votes	%	±%
Labour	Usman Arif	2,187	49.76	
Liberal Democrats	Waseem Chowdhary	945	21.50	
Conservative	Tom Commis	937	21.32	
Green	Helen Bridges	281	6.39	
Majority		1,242	28.26	
Labour hold		Swing		

Burnley Rural
Party	Candidate	Votes	%	±%
Conservative	Cosima Towneley	1,608	38.70	
Green	Scott Cunliffe	1,002	24.12	
Liberal Democrats	Pippa Lishman	777	18.70	
Labour	Marcus Johnstone	551	13.26	
BAPIP	Andrew Newhouse	178	4.28	
Majority		606	14.58	
Conservative hold		Swing		

Burnley South West
Party	Candidate	Votes	%	±%
Labour	Lian Pate	853	24.57	
Liberal Democrats	Jeff Sumner	848	24.42	
Conservative	Peter Gill	795	22.90	
BAPIP	Neil Mottershead	786	22.64	
Green	Duncan Reid	160	4.61	
Majority		5	0.14	
Labour gain from Liberal Democrats		Swing		

Padiham & Burnley West
Party	Candidate	Votes	%	±%
Conservative	Alan Hosker	2,299	61.54	
Labour	Mark Townsend	919	24.60	
Liberal Democrats	Peter McCann	292	7.82	
Green	Sarah Hall	190	5.09	
Majority		1,380	36.94	
Conservative gain from UKIP		Swing		

=== Chorley ===
Chorley district summary
Party	Seats	+/-	Votes	%	+/-
Labour	5	▲1	15,883	49.0	+0.9
Conservative	3	▼1	13,089	40.4	–0.4
Green	0	Steady	2,463	7.6	+6.9
Liberal Democrats	0	Steady	725	2.2	–2.9
Independent	0	Steady	274	0.8	+0.1
Total	8	Steady	32,434		

Division results

Chorley Central
Party	Candidate	Votes	%	±%
Labour	Steve Holgate	2,393	56.71	
Conservative	Peter Malpas	1,423	33.72	
Green	Jane Weston	367	8.70	
Majority		970	22.99	
Labour hold		Swing		

Chorley North
Party	Candidate	Votes	%	±%
Labour	Hasina Khan	1,740	59.32	
Conservative	Magdalene Cullens	831	28.33	
Green	Kath Becker	335	11.42	
Majority		909	30.99	
Labour hold		Swing		

Chorley Rural East
Party	Candidate	Votes	%	±%
Labour	Kim Snape	2,484	60.76	
Conservative	James Siswick	1,355	33.15	
Green	Finty Royle	228	5.58	
Majority		1,129	27.62	
Labour hold		Swing		

Chorley Rural West
Party	Candidate	Votes	%	±%
Conservative	Keith Iddon	2,288	48.14	
Labour	Alan Whittaker	1,938	40.77	
Liberal Democrats	John Wright	250	5.26	
Green	John Clare	246	5.18	
Majority		350	7.36	
Conservative hold		Swing		

Chorley South
Party	Candidate	Votes	%	±%
Labour	Julia Berry	2,149	59.58	
Conservative	Christine Turner	984	27.28	
Green	Andy Hunter-Rossall	443	12.28	
Majority		1,165	32.30	
Labour hold		Swing		

Clayton with Whittle
Party	Candidate	Votes	%	±%
Labour	Mark Clifford	2,044	47.76	
Conservative	Sam Chapman	1,826	42.66	
Green	Olga Gomez-Cash	203	4.74	
Liberal Democrats	Gail Ormston	176	4.11	
Majority		218	5.09	
Labour gain from Conservative		Swing		

Euxton, Buckshaw & Astley
Party	Candidate	Votes	%	±%
Conservative	Aidy Riggott	2,511	52.21	
Labour	Catherine Donegan	1,668	34.68	
Independent	Mark Perks	274	5.70	
Green	Rachel Smith	226	4.70	
Liberal Democrats	Rowan Power	96	2.00	
Majority		843	17.53	
Conservative hold		Swing		

Hoghton with Wheelton
Party	Candidate	Votes	%	±%
Conservative	Alan Cullens	1,871	46.82	
Labour	Peter Gabbott	1,467	36.71	
Green	Clare Hales	415	10.39	
Liberal Democrats	Stephen Fenn	203	5.08	
Majority		404	10.11	
Conservative hold		Swing		

=== Fylde ===
Fylde district summary
Party	Seats	+/-	Votes	%	+/-
Conservative	5	▲2	12,639	55.7	+8.0
Independent	0	▼2	3,984	17.5	–8.4
Labour	0	Steady	3,464	15.3	+2.2
Liberal Democrats	0	Steady	1,902	8.4	+0.1
Green	0	Steady	716	3.2	+0.3
Total	6	Steady	22,705		

Division results

Fylde East
Party	Candidate	Votes	%	±%
Conservative	Stuart Jones	1,493	40.45	
Independent	Peter Collins	1,343	36.39	
Labour	Verity Halliday	620	16.80	
Independent	Carole Buckley	111	3.01	
Liberal Democrats	Sandra Throup	106	2.87	
Majority		150	4.06	
Conservative gain from Independent		Swing		

Fylde South
Party	Candidate	Votes	%	±%
Conservative	Paul Rigby	1,911	61.02	
Independent	Julie Brickles	583	18.61	
Labour	Gareth Trickett	351	11.21	
Green	Duncan Royle	272	8.68	
Majority		1,328	42.40	
Conservative hold		Swing		

Fylde West
Party	Candidate	Votes	%	±%
Conservative	John Singleton	2,586	69.02	
Labour	Karen Elger	706	18.84	
Liberal Democrats	Nick Bell	438	11.69	
Majority		1,880	50.17	
Conservative gain from Independent		Swing		

Lytham
Party	Candidate	Votes	%	±%
Conservative	Tim Ashton	2,128	46.14	
Independent	Mark Bamforth	1,947	42.22	
Labour	Fran Wild	367	7.96	
Liberal Democrats	Stephen Phillips	143	3.10	
Majority		181	3.92	
Conservative hold		Swing		

St Annes North
Party	Candidate	Votes	%	±%
Conservative	Peter Buckley	2,240	58.68	
Liberal Democrats	Joanne Gardner	908	23.79	
Labour	Oscar Marshall	650	17.03	
Majority		1,332	34.90	
Conservative hold		Swing		

St Annes South
Party	Candidate	Votes	%	±%
Conservative	Steve Rigby	2,281	59.51	
Labour	Justin DeRizzio-George	770	20.09	
Green	Patricia Fielding	444	11.58	
Liberal Democrats	Andrew Holland	307	8.01	
Majority		1,511	39.42	
Conservative hold		Swing		

=== Hyndburn ===
Hyndburn district summary
Party	Seats	+/-	Votes	%	+/-
Conservative	3	▲2	11,611	44.0	+2.0
Labour	3	▼2	11,513	43.6	–4.6
Green	0	Steady	1,397	5.3	+3.4
Reform UK	0	Steady	876	3.3	N/A
Independent	0	Steady	646	2.4	N/A
Liberal Democrats	0	Steady	205	0.8	N/A
UKIP	0	Steady	154	0.6	–7.4
Total	6	Steady	26,402		

Division results

Accrington North
Party	Candidate	Votes	%	±%
Labour	Loraine Cox	1,606	53.18	−9.87
Conservative	Shahed Mahmood	1,017	33.68	−2.76
Green	Joan West	199	6.59	N/A
UKIP	Len Harris	154	5.10	N/A
Majority		589	19.50	
Labour hold		Swing		

Accrington South
Party	Candidate	Votes	%	±%
Conservative	Terry Hurn	1,737	49.25	+4.80
Labour	Bernard Dawson	1,524	43.21	−3.75
Green	Katrina Brockbank	225	6.38	N/A
Majority		216	6.04	
Conservative gain from Labour		Swing		

Accrington West & Oswaldtwistle Central
Party	Candidate	Votes	%	±%
Labour	Munsif Dad	2,138	48.45	−18.00
Conservative	Mohammed Younis	1,938	43.92	+16.92
Green	Tony Seaford	266	6.03	N/A
Majority		200	4.53	
Labour hold		Swing		

Oswaldtwistle
Party	Candidate	Votes	%	±%
Conservative	Peter Britcliffe	1,952	54.66	−1.38
Labour	Glen Harrison	1,284	35.96	+8.85
Reform	Jake Allen	151	4.23	N/A
Green	Julie Stubbins	112	3.14	N/A
Liberal Democrats	Bethany Waller-Slack	48	1.34	N/A
Majority		668	18.71	
Conservative hold		Swing		

Great Harwood, Rishton & Clayton Le Moors
Party	Candidate	Votes	%	±%
Conservative	Carol Haythornthwaite	2,685	39.92	−1.97
Labour	Noordad Aziz	2,592	38.54	−3.46
Labour	Kate Walsh	2,369	35.22	−4.53
Conservative	Gareth Molineux	2,282	33.93	−3.91
Independent	Pat McGinley	646	9.60	N/A
Reform	Wayne Fitzharris	382	5.68	N/A
Green	Susie Kinghan	356	5.29	0
Reform	Ian Robinson	343	5.10	N/A
Green	Graham Sowter	239	3.55	N/A
Liberal Democrats	Adam Waller-Slack	157	2.33	N/A
Majority		N/A	N/A	
Conservative gain from Labour		Swing		
Labour hold		Swing		

=== Lancaster ===
Lancaster district summary
Party	Seats	+/-	Votes	%	+/-
Conservative	5	Steady	12,647	33.6	–6.5
Labour	4	Steady	12,889	34.2	–2.0
Green	1	Steady	7,167	19.1	+5.6
Liberal Democrats	0	Steady	3,329	8.8	+1.8
Independent	0	Steady	1,586	4.2	N/A
Total	10	Steady	37,618		

Division results

Heysham
Party	Candidate	Votes	%	±%
Conservative	Andrew Gardiner	1,342	38.16	
Labour	Sarah Hayland	1,202	34.18	
Independent	Roger Cleet	655	18.62	
Green	Joanna Young	211	6.00	
Liberal Democrats	Jim Pilling	83	2.36	
Majority		140	3.98	
Conservative hold		Swing		

Lancaster Central
Party	Candidate	Votes	%	±%
Green	Gina Dowding	2,760	59.82	
Labour	Ruth Colbridge	1,084	23.49	
Conservative	Janet Walton	747	16.19	
Majority		1,676	36.32	
Green hold		Swing		

Lancaster East
Party	Candidate	Votes	%	±%
Labour	Lizzi Collinge	1,886	46.25	
Green	Jamie Melly	1,658	40.66	
Conservative	Kevan Walton	403	9.88	
Liberal Democrats	Katia Adimora	78	1.91	
Majority		228	5.59	
Labour hold		Swing		

Lancaster Rural East
Party	Candidate	Votes	%	±%
Conservative	Matthew Maxwell-Scott	1,950	43.29	
Labour	Lisa Corkerry	1,090	24.20	
Liberal Democrats	Peter Jackson	1,063	23.60	
Green	Jan Maskell	377	8.37	
Majority		860	19.09	
Conservative hold		Swing		

Lancaster Rural North
Party	Candidate	Votes	%	±%
Conservative	Phillippa Williamson	2,242	55.61	
Labour	Luke Taylor	1,076	26.69	
Green	Abi Mills	390	9.67	
Liberal Democrats	Catherine Pilling	288	7.14	
Majority		1,166	28.92	
Conservative hold		Swing		

Lancaster South East
Party	Candidate	Votes	%	±%
Labour	Erica Lewis	1,890	48.75	
Green	Hamish Mills	974	25.12	
Conservative	Paul Moon	770	19.86	
Liberal Democrats	Jake Perkins	218	5.62	
Majority		916	23.63	
Labour hold		Swing		

Morecambe Central
Party	Candidate	Votes	%	±%
Labour	Margaret Pattison	1,175	35.74	
Liberal Democrats	Paul Hart	1,172	35.64	
Conservative	John Wild	622	18.92	
Independent	Darren Clifford	184	5.60	
Green	Patrick McMurray	98	2.98	
Majority		3	0.09	
Labour hold		Swing		

Morecambe North
Party	Candidate	Votes	%	±%
Conservative	Stuart Morris	2,243	57.29	
Labour	Geoffrey Gawith	1,056	26.97	
Green	Chloe Germaine	374	9.55	
Liberal Democrats	Tony Saville	215	5.49	
Majority		1,187	30.32	
Conservative hold		Swing		

Morecambe South
Party	Candidate	Votes	%	±%
Conservative	Charles Edwards	1,568	44.86	
Labour	Phillip Black	1,192	34.11	
Independent	Merv Evans	522	14.94	
Green	Diana Jones	97	2.78	
Liberal Democrats	Richard Blaikie	94	2.69	
Majority		376	10.76	
Conservative hold		Swing		

Skerton
Party	Candidate	Votes	%	±%
Labour	Hilda Parr	1,238	47.63	
Conservative	Jane Cottam	760	29.24	
Green	Emlyn Busby	228	8.77	
Independent	John Reynolds	225	8.66	
Liberal Democrats	Derek Kaye	118	4.54	
Majority		478	18.39	
Labour hold		Swing		

=== Pendle ===
Pendle district summary
Party	Seats	+/-	Votes	%	+/-
Conservative	4	▲1	16,008	46.4	+0.1
Labour	2	Steady	9,872	28.6	+3.7
Liberal Democrats	0	▼1	7,397	21.4	–0.3
Green	0	Steady	1,226	3.6	+1.3
Total	6	Steady	34,503		

Division results

Brierfield & Nelson West
Party	Candidate	Votes	%	±%
Labour	Mohammed Iqbal	3,914	55.75	+3.04
Conservative	Mohammed Aslam	2,638	37.57	−4.41
Green	Annette Marti	210	2.99	N/A
Liberal Democrats	Mary Thomas	174	2.48	−2.82
Majority		1,276	18.17	
Labour hold		Swing		

Nelson East
Party	Candidate	Votes	%	±%
Labour	Azhar Ali	2,751	56.72	−0.40
Conservative	Adrian Mitchell	1,699	35.03	+2.96
Green	Frankie Bell	178	3.67	N/A
Liberal Democrats	Keith Thornton	172	3.55	−7.26
Majority		1,052	21.69	
Labour hold		Swing		

Pendle Central
Party	Candidate	Votes	%	±%
Conservative	Ash Sutcliffe	1,772	52.43	+10.45
Liberal Democrats	Dorothy Lord	1,005	29.73	−2.25
Labour	Yvonne Tennant	570	16.86	−3.49
Majority		767	22.69	
Conservative hold		Swing		

Pendle Hill
Party	Candidate	Votes	%	±%
Conservative	Christopher Hartley	2,896	55.31	−13.88
Labour	Patricia Hannah-Wood	1,577	30.12	+10.21
Liberal Democrats	Brian Newman	707	13.50	+6.73
Majority		1,319	25.19	
Conservative hold		Swing		

Pendle Rural
Party	Candidate	Votes	%	±%
Conservative	Jennifer Purcell	3,649	47.35	+0.98
Conservative	Mike Goulthorp	3,354	43.52	+3.15
Liberal Democrats	David Whipp	3,103	40.27	−1.05
Liberal Democrats	Tom Whipp	2,236	29.02	+1.03
Labour	Robert French	1,060	13.76	+2.39
Green	Jane Wood	838	10.87	+3.72
Majority		251	3.25	
Conservative gain from Liberal Democrats		Swing		
Conservative hold		Swing		

=== Preston ===
Preston district summary
Party	Seats	+/-	Votes	%	+/-
Labour	6	Steady	13,618	44.8	+1.4
Conservative	2	Steady	10,976	36.1	–0.5
Liberal Democrats	1	Steady	4,561	15.0	+1.9
Independent	0	Steady	1,131	3.7	N/A
Heritage	0	Steady	116	0.4	N/A
Total	9	Steady	30,402		

Division results

Preston Central East
Party	Candidate	Votes	%	±%
Labour	Frank de Molfetta	2,591	75.01	
Conservative	Jonty Campbell	620	17.95	
Liberal Democrats	Edward Craven	201	5.82	
Majority		1,971	57.06	
Labour hold		Swing		

Preston Central West
Party	Candidate	Votes	%	±%
Labour	Matthew Brown	1,555	54.33	
Conservative	Becky French	742	25.93	
Liberal Democrats	Claire Craven	539	18.83	
Majority		813	28.41	
Labour hold		Swing		

Preston City
Party	Candidate	Votes	%	±%
Labour	Yousuf Motala	2,082	66.97	
Conservative	Andy Pratt	637	20.49	
Liberal Democrats	Taylor Donoughue-Smith	227	7.30	
Heritage	James Elliot	116	3.73	
Majority		1,445	46.48	
Labour hold		Swing		

Preston East
Party	Candidate	Votes	%	±%
Labour	Anna Hindle	1,478	52.64	
Conservative	Daniel Duckworth	1,119	39.85	
Liberal Democrats	Mike Turner	181	6.45	
Majority		359	12.78	
Labour hold		Swing		

Preston North
Party	Candidate	Votes	%	±%
Conservative	Ron Woollam	2,279	49.66	
Labour	Yakub Patel	1,399	30.49	
Liberal Democrats	Owen Lambert	873	19.02	
Majority		880	19.18	
Conservative hold		Swing		

Preston Rural
Party	Candidate	Votes	%	±%
Conservative	Sue Whittam	2,817	66.14	
Labour	Connor Dwyer	979	22.99	
Liberal Democrats	Daniel Guise	418	9.81	
Majority		1,838	43.16	
Conservative hold		Swing		

Preston South East
Party	Candidate	Votes	%	±%
Labour	Jennifer Mein	1,585	68.00	
Conservative	Luke Walmsley	426	18.28	
Independent	Mark Cotterill	204	8.75	
Liberal Democrats	Fiona Duke	116	4.98	
Majority		1,159	49.72	
Labour hold		Swing		

Preston South West
Party	Candidate	Votes	%	±%
Labour	Nweeda Khan	1,321	37.88	
Independent	Michael Balshaw	927	26.58	
Conservative	Scott Rainford	838	24.03	
Liberal Democrats	Mark Jewell	372	10.67	
Majority		394	11.30	
Labour hold		Swing		

Preston West
Party	Candidate	Votes	%	±%
Liberal Democrats	John Potter	1,634	43.10	
Conservative	Trevor Hart	1,498	39.51	
Labour	James Timms	628	16.57	
Majority		136	3.59	
Liberal Democrats hold		Swing		

=== Ribble Valley ===
Ribble Valley district summary
Party	Seats	+/-	Votes	%	+/-
Conservative	4	Steady	9,218	53.1	–9.5
Labour	0	Steady	3,090	17.8	+0.3
Liberal Democrats	0	Steady	2,192	12.3	–6.3
Independent	0	Steady	1,694	9.8	N/A
Green	0	Steady	1,229	7.1	+5.8
Total	4	Steady	17,360		

Division results

Clitheroe
Party	Candidate	Votes	%	±%
Conservative	Sue Hind	1,313	29.67	
Liberal Democrats	Simon O'Rourke	1,301	29.39	
Independent	Ian Brown	842	19.02	
Labour	Michael Graveston	736	16.63	
Green	Malcolm Peplow	207	4.68	
Majority		12	0.27	
Conservative hold		Swing		

Longridge with Bowland
Party	Candidate	Votes	%	±%
Conservative	Rupert Swarbrick	2,370	63.61	
Labour	Karl Barnsley	746	20.02	
Green	Paul Yates	379	10.17	
Liberal Democrats	Donna O'Rourke	202	5.42	
Majority		1,624	43.59	
Conservative hold		Swing		

Ribble Valley North East
Party	Candidate	Votes	%	±%
Conservative	Ged Mirfin	2,555	52.55	
Labour	Anthony McNamara	869	17.87	
Independent	David Birtwhistle	852	17.52	
Green	Gaye McCrum	312	6.42	
Liberal Democrats	Mary Robinson	229	4.71	
Majority		1,686	34.68	
Conservative hold		Swing		

Ribble Valley South West
Party	Candidate	Votes	%	±%
Conservative	Alan Schofield	2,980	66.52	
Labour	Lee Jameson	739	16.50	
Liberal Democrats	John Hymas	397	8.86	
Green	Anne Peplow	331	7.39	
Majority		2,241	50.02	
Conservative hold		Swing		

=== Rossendale ===
Rossendale district summary
Party	Seats	+/-	Votes	%	+/-
Labour	3	▲3	7,930	42.0	–2.5
Conservative	2	▼3	7,738	41.0	–8.8
Independent	0	Steady	2,427	12.9	N/A
Green	0	Steady	772	4.1	+1.3
Total	5	Steady	18,867		

Division results

Mid-Rossendale
Party	Candidate	Votes	%	±%
Labour	Sean Serridge	2,291	50.14	
Conservative	Jenny Rigby	2,231	48.83	
Majority		60	1.31	
Labour gain from Conservative		Swing		

Rossendale East
Party	Candidate	Votes	%	±%
Labour	Jackie Oakes	1,445	41.19	
Conservative	Margaret Pendlebury	910	25.94	
Independent	Jimmy Eaton	891	25.40	
Green	John Payne	238	6.78	
Majority		535	15.25	
Labour gain from Conservative		Swing		

Rossendale South
Party	Candidate	Votes	%	±%
Conservative	Anne Cheetham	1,869	49.71	
Labour	Patrick Marriott	1,535	40.82	
Green	Julie White	330	8.78	
Majority		334	8.88	
Conservative hold		Swing		

Rossendale West
Party	Candidate	Votes	%	±%
Labour	Samara Barnes	1,765	43.69	
Conservative	Laura-Beth Thompson	1,688	41.78	
Independent	David Stansfield	556	13.76	
Majority		77	1.91	
Labour gain from Conservative		Swing		

Whitworth & Bacup
Party	Candidate	Votes	%	±%
Conservative	Scott Smith	1,040	32.94	
Community First	Alan Neal	980	31.04	
Labour	Barbara Ashworth	894	28.32	
Green	Daniel Brogan	204	6.46	
Majority		60	1.90	
Conservative hold		Swing		

=== South Ribble ===
South Ribble district summary
Party	Seats	+/-	Votes	%	+/-
Conservative	6	Steady	15,603	50.4	–4.4
Labour	1	Steady	10,601	34.2	+3.5
Liberal Democrats	1	Steady	4,117	13.3	–0.7
Green	0	Steady	583	1.9	+1.4
For Britain	0	Steady	55	0.2	N/A
Total	8	Steady	30,959		

Division results

Leyland Central
Party	Candidate	Votes	%	±%
Labour	Matthew Tomlinson	1,914	54.08	
Conservative	Craige Southern	1,331	37.61	
Green	Sue Broady	159	4.49	
Liberal Democrats	Stephen McHugh	106	3.00	
Majority		583	16.47	
Labour hold		Swing		

Leyland South
Party	Candidate	Votes	%	±%
Conservative	Jayne Rear	1,766	47.46	
Labour	Lou Jackson	1,516	40.74	
Liberal Democrats	Paul Valentine	404	10.86	
Majority		250	6.72	
Conservative hold		Swing		

Lostock Hall & Bamber Bridge
Party	Candidate	Votes	%	±%
Conservative	Jeffrey Couperthwaite	1,883	51.36	
Labour	Chris Lomax	1,609	43.89	
Liberal Democrats	Carol Stunell	161	4.39	
Majority		274	7.47	
Conservative hold		Swing		

Moss Side & Farington
Party	Candidate	Votes	%	±%
Conservative	Michael Green	2,011	60.54	
Labour	Haydn Williams	891	26.82	
Green	John Swarbrick	211	6.35	
Liberal Democrats	Simon Thomson	133	4.00	
For Britain	Joan Wright	55	1.66	
Majority		1,120	33.71	
Conservative hold		Swing		

Penwortham East & Walton-le-Dale
Party	Candidate	Votes	%	±%
Conservative	Joan Burrows	1,937	51.82	
Labour	Carol Henshaw	1,547	41.39	
Liberal Democrats	Chris Burton-Johnson	218	5.83	
Majority		390	10.43	
Conservative hold		Swing		

Penwortham West
Party	Candidate	Votes	%	±%
Liberal Democrats	David Howarth	2,513	49.27	
Conservative	Linda Shave	1,421	27.86	
Labour	David Bennett	929	18.22	
Green	Colette Davies	213	4.18	
Majority		1,092	21.41	
Liberal Democrats hold		Swing		

South Ribble East
Party	Candidate	Votes	%	±%
Conservative	Barrie Yates	2,186	60.86	
Labour	James Gleeson	1,144	31.85	
Liberal Democrats	Stephanie Portersmith	229	6.38	
Majority		1,042	29.01	
Conservative hold		Swing		

South Ribble West
Party	Candidate	Votes	%	±%
Conservative	Graham Gooch	3,068	68.09	
Labour	Mike Webster	1,051	23.32	
Liberal Democrats	Simon Carter	353	7.83	
Majority		2,017	44.76	
Conservative hold		Swing		

=== West Lancashire ===
West Lancashire district summary
Party	Seats	+/-	Votes	%	+/-
Labour	4	Steady	12,959	41.4	–4.8
Conservative	4	Steady	11,932	38.2	–3.4
OWL	0	Steady	2,814	9.0	+3.5
Independent	0	Steady	1,617	5.2	N/A
Liberal Democrats	0	Steady	1,487	4.8	+0.4
Green	0	Steady	460	1.5	–0.3
Total	8	Steady	31,269		

Division results

Burscough & Rufford
Party	Candidate	Votes	%	±%
Conservative	Eddie Pope	2,112	50.18	
Labour	Gareth Dowling	1,760	41.82	
Liberal Democrats	Neil Pollington	298	7.08	
Majority		352	8.36	
Conservative hold		Swing		

Ormskirk
Party	Candidate	Votes	%	±%
Labour	Nikki Hennessy	2,051	46.47	
OWL	Kate Mitchell	1,449	32.83	
Conservative	George Pratt	780	17.67	
Liberal Democrats	Stephen Hunter	103	2.33	
Majority		602	13.64	
Labour hold		Swing		

Skelmersdale Central
Party	Candidate	Votes	%	±%
Labour	Terence Aldridge	1,972	64.19	
Skelmersdale Independents	Aaron Body	596	19.40	
Conservative	Ruth Melling	316	10.29	
Green	Laura Dalton	84	2.73	
Workers Party	John Larkin	49	1.60	
Liberal Democrats	Callum Clark	39	1.27	
Majority		1,376	44.79	
Labour hold		Swing		

Skelmersdale East
Party	Candidate	Votes	%	±%
Labour	John Fillis	1,717	45.09	
Conservative	Katie Juckes	1,350	35.45	
Green	John Puddifer	376	9.87	
Skelmersdale Independents	Brian Hughes	259	6.80	
Liberal Democrats	Nick Rekers	76	2.00	
Majority		367	9.64	
Labour hold		Swing		

Skelmersdale West
Party	Candidate	Votes	%	±%
Labour	Julie Gibson	2,120	57.97	
Skelmersdale Independents	Leonie Goldson	762	20.84	
Conservative	George Rear	512	14.00	
Liberal Democrats	Peter Chandler	220	6.02	
Majority		1,358	37.13	
Labour hold		Swing		

West Lancashire East
Party	Candidate	Votes	%	±%
Conservative	Robert Bailey	1,796	41.36	
OWL	Ian Davis	1,365	31.44	
Labour	Terence Devine	1,010	23.26	
Liberal Democrats	Ruxandra-Mihaela Trandafoiu	143	3.29	
Majority		431	9.93	
Conservative hold		Swing		

West Lancashire North
Party	Candidate	Votes	%	±%
Conservative	David Westley	2,805	68.26	
Labour	Damian Owen	1,017	24.75	
Liberal Democrats	Dermot O'Hara	250	6.08	
Majority		1,788	43.51	
Conservative hold		Swing		

West Lancashire West
Party	Candidate	Votes	%	±%
Conservative	David O'Toole	2,261	57.01	
Labour	Claire Cooper	1,312	33.08	
Liberal Democrats	David Thomas	358	9.03	
Majority		949	23.93	
Conservative hold		Swing		

=== Wyre ===
Wyre district summary
Party	Seats	+/-	Votes	%	+/-
Conservative	7	Steady	19,007	61.6	+0.9
Labour	1	Steady	8,344	27.0	–0.5
Green	0	Steady	1,709	5.5	+0.7
Liberal Democrats	0	Steady	944	3.1	N/A
Independent	0	Steady	713	2.3	–2.9
Reform UK	0	Steady	102	0.3	N/A
SDP	0	Steady	45	0.1	N/A
Total	8	Steady	30,864		

Division results

Cleveleys East
Party	Candidate	Votes	%	±%
Conservative	Andrea Kay	2,345	68.09	
Labour	Terry Lees	820	23.81	
Green	Matt Hanley	152	4.41	
Liberal Democrats	Lee Taylor-Jack	81	2.35	
Majority		1,525	44.28	
Conservative hold		Swing		

Cleveleys South & Carleton
Party	Candidate	Votes	%	±%
Conservative	Alan Vincent	2,356	58.67	
Labour	Holly Swales	1,204	29.98	
Green	Barbara Mead-Mason	234	5.83	
Liberal Democrats	Teresa Wilson	179	4.46	
Majority		1,152	28.69	
Conservative hold		Swing		

Fleetwood East
Party	Candidate	Votes	%	±%
Labour	Lorraine Beavers	1,740	53.33	
Conservative	Susan Hunt	869	26.63	
Independent	Brian Crawford	351	10.76	
Green	Michael Pickton	127	3.89	
Reform	Paul Sandham	102	3.13	
Liberal Democrats	Gerry Blaikie	43	1.32	
Majority		871	26.69	
Labour hold		Swing		

Fleetwood West & Cleveleys West
Party	Candidate	Votes	%	±%
Conservative	Stephen Clarke	1,974	52.25	
Labour	Cheryl Raynor	1,234	32.66	
Independent	Adam Diver	362	9.58	
Green	John Warnock	127	3.36	
Liberal Democrats	Amy Stanning	45	1.19	
Majority		740	19.59	
Conservative hold		Swing		

Poulton-le-Fylde
Party	Candidate	Votes	%	±%
Conservative	Alf Clempson	3,001	69.10	
Labour	Natalya Stone	923	21.25	
Green	Nicky Sharkey	257	5.92	
Liberal Democrats	Rebecca Potter	122	2.81	
Majority		2,078	47.85	
Conservative hold		Swing		

Thornton & Hambleton
Party	Candidate	Votes	%	±%
Conservative	John Shedwick	2,640	72.19	
Labour	Andy Meredith	843	23.05	
Liberal Democrats	Peter Lawrence	153	4.18	
Majority		1,797	49.14	
Conservative hold		Swing		

Wyre Rural Central
Party	Candidate	Votes	%	±%
Conservative	Matthew Salter	2,513	66.75	
Labour	Richard Johnson	740	19.65	
Green	Susan White	382	10.15	
Liberal Democrats	Bethany Frost	98	2.60	
Majority		1,773	47.09	
Conservative hold		Swing		

Wyre Rural East
Party	Candidate	Votes	%	±%
Conservative	Shaun Turner	3,309	67.70	
Labour	David Gale	840	17.18	
Green	Nicholas Danby	430	8.80	
Liberal Democrats	Andrew Stevenson	223	4.56	
SDP	Jonathan Binnie	45	0.92	
Majority		2,469	50.51	
Conservative hold		Swing		

== By-elections ==
=== Chorley Rural West ===
Chorley Rural West by-election, 14 September 2023
Party	Candidate	Votes	%	±%
Labour	Alan Whittaker	1,642	52.09	+11.32
Conservative	Val Caunce	1,279	40.57	−7.57
Liberal Democrats	Rowan Power	231	7.34	+2.08
Majority		363		
Labour gain from Conservative		Swing	9.45	

The Chorley Rural West by-election was triggered by the death of Conservative councillor Keith Iddon.

=== Burnley Central West ===
Burnley Central West: 26 October 2023
Party	Candidate	Votes	%	±%
Green	Scott Cunliffe	630	32.4	+1.4
Labour	Charles Briggs	583	30.0	+14.7
Conservative	Donald Whitaker	574	29.5	+5.7
Liberal Democrats	Jeff Sumner	156	8.0	–3.1
Majority		47	2.4	
Turnout		1,951	18.8	
Registered electors		19,385		
Green hold		Swing	▼6.7	

The Burnley Central West by-election was triggered by the resignation of Green councillor Andy Fewings.
