= 2025 Lancashire County Council election =

2025 English local election

- 1 May 2025

All 84 seats to Lancashire County Council 43 seats needed for a majority
	First party	Second party	Third party
Leader	Stephen Atkinson	Philippa Williamson (defeated)	none
Party	Reform	Conservative	Independent
Last election	0 seats, 0.3%	48 seats, 43.9%	0 seats, 3.4%
Seats before	2	46	7
Seats won	53	8	9 (Note: Includes 2 councillors elected as Our West Lancashire.)
Seat change	▲53	▼40	▲2
Popular vote	117,707	69,748	22,090
Percentage	35.7%	21.1%	6.7%
Swing	▲35.4 pp	▼22.8 pp	▲2.5 pp
	Fourth party	Fifth party	Sixth party
Leader	Matthew Tomlinson (defeated)	none	none
Party	Labour	Liberal Democrats	Green
Last election	32 seats, 34.8%	2 seats, 9.1%	2 seats, 6.3%
Seats before	26	2	2
Seats won	5	5	4
Seat change	▼27	▲3	▲2
Popular vote	62,414	29,726	27,629
Percentage	18.9%	9.0%	8.4%
Swing	▼15.9 pp	▼0.1 pp	▲2.1 pp
- Map showing the results of the 2025 Lancashire County Council election.

- Composition of the Lancashire County Council after the election.
Leader before election
Philippa Williamson
Conservative
Leader after election
Stephen Atkinson
Reform

The 2025 Lancashire County Council election took place on 1 May 2025 to elect members to Lancashire County Council in Lancashire, England. All 84 seats were elected. This was on the same day as other local elections. The council was under Conservative majority control prior to the election. At the election, Reform UK won a majority of the seats on the council.

== Background ==
In the 2021 election, the Conservatives won 48 seats, giving them a majority and control of the council. The Labour Party were the second biggest party with 32 seats, followed by the Liberal Democrats and Greens with 2 seats each.

== Previous council composition ==
After 2021 election		Before 2025 election	
Party	Seats	Party	Seats
Conservative	48	Conservative	46
Labour	32	Labour	26
Liberal Democrats	2	Liberal Democrats	2
Green	2	Green	2
Reform	0	Reform	2
Independent	0	Independent	5
Vacant	N/A	Vacant	1

=== Changes 2021–2025 ===
Two by-elections took place between the 2021 and 2025 elections:

Conservative Labour Green

By-elections
Division	Date	Incumbent	Winner	Cause	Ref.
Chorley Rural West	14 September 2023	Keith Iddon	Alan Whittaker	Death	
Burnley Central West	26 October 2023	Andy Fewings	Scott Cunliffe	Resignation	

In June 2022, councillor Mohammed Iqbal of Brierfield & Nelson West was suspended from the Labour Party following comments, which were alleged to be anti-Semitic, where he compared the actions of Israel in the Gaza war to the Nazis in World War II. In November 2023, councillors Sobia Malik of Burnley Central East, Usman Arif of Burnley North East and Yousuf Motala of Preston City resigned from the Labour Party in protest of party leader Keir Starmer's decision to not call for a ceasefire in the Gaza war. In February 2024, councillor Azhar Ali of Nelson East was suspended from the Labour Party following comments where he claimed that Israel had used the October 7 attacks as a pretext to invade the Gaza Strip.

After the 2024 general election, a casual vacancy opened in Fleetwood East as councillor Lorraine Beavers resigned her council seat after being elected as MP for Blackpool North and Fleetwood. No by-election for her council seat was called for, and so that seat was left vacant until the May 2025 election.

- June 2022: Mohammed Iqbal (Labour) suspended from party
- September 2022: Loraine Cox (Labour) joins Conservatives
- June 2023: Keith Iddon (Conservative) dies – by-election held September 2023
- September 2023: Alan Whittaker (Labour) gains by-election from Conservatives; Andy Fewings (Green) resigns – by-election held October 2023
- October 2023: Scott Cunliffe (Green) wins by-election
- November 2023: Usman Arif (Labour), Sobia Malik (Labour), and Yousuf Motala (Labour) leave party to sit as independents
- February 2024: Azhar Ali (Labour) suspended from party
- February 2025: Lorraine Beavers (Labour) resigns – seat left vacant until 2025 election
- March 2025: Matthew Salter (Conservative) and Ged Mirfin (Conservative) join Reform UK

== Summary ==
The Conservatives held a majority on the council prior to the election, but were reduced from 46 seats to just eight. The leader of the council, Philippa Williamson, was one of the Conservatives who lost their seats. Reform UK only had two seats on the council prior to the election, both being former Conservatives who had joined the party in March 2025. Reform won 53 seats on the council at the election, giving them an overall majority.

After the election, Reform chose Stephen Atkinson to be its group leader. He had not been a county councillor prior to the election, but had previously been the Conservative leader of Ribble Valley Borough Council. He had resigned from that post in March 2025 on leaving the Conservatives to join Reform. He was formally appointed the new leader of Lancashire County Council at the subsequent annual council meeting on 22 May 2025.

=== Candidates ===
This table was confirmed 3 April 2025.

	Burnley	Chorley	Fylde	Hyndburn	Lancaster	Pendle	Preston	Ribble Valley	Rossendale	South Ribble	West Lancashire	Wyre	Total
Conservative	6	8	6	6	10	6	9	4	5	8	8	8	84
Labour	6	8	6	6	10	6	9	4	5	8	8	8	84
Green	6	8	6	6	10	6	9	4	5	8	8	8	84
Reform	6	8	6	6	10	6	9	4	5	8	8	8	84
Liberal Democrats	3	6	3	0	10	6	9	4	1	8	5	7	62
Independent	4	1	5	0	0	2	5	4	0	0	0	2	23
TUSC	0	5	0	0	0	0	1	0	0	2	0	0	8
OWL	0	0	0	0	0	0	0	0	0	0	4	0	4
ADF	0	0	2	0	0	0	0	0	0	0	0	0	2
UKIP	0	0	0	0	0	0	1	0	0	0	0	0	1
Workers Party	1	0	0	0	0	0	0	0	0	0	0	0	1

=== Election result ===
2025 Lancashire County Council election
Party	Candidates	Seats	Gains	Losses	Net gain/loss	Seats %	Votes %	Votes	+/−
Reform	84	53	53	0	▲53	63.1	35.7	117,707	+35.4
Conservative	84	8	0	40	▼40	9.5	21.1	69,748	–22.8
Independent	23	7	7	0	▲7	8.3	5.5	18,024	+2.1
Labour	84	5	0	27	▼27	6.0	18.9	62,414	–15.9
Liberal Democrats	62	5	3	0	▲3	6.0	9.0	29,726	–0.1
Green	84	4	3	1	▲2	4.8	8.4	27,629	+2.1
OWL	4	2	2	0	▲2	2.4	1.2	4,066	+0.4
TUSC	8	0	0	0	Steady	0.0	0.1	370	N/A
Alliance for Democracy and Freedom (UK)	2	0	0	0	Steady	0.0	<0.1	71	N/A
Workers Party	1	0	0	0	Steady	0.0	<0.1	39	±0.0
UKIP	1	0	0	0	Steady	0.0	<0.1	18	–0.1

== Candidates by district ==
=== District summaries ===
Results summary for divisions in Burnley
Seat	Result	Majority
Burnley Central East	Independent GAIN from Labour	268
Burnley Central West	Reform GAIN from Green	617
Burnley North East	Independent GAIN from Labour	1,527
Burnley Rural	Reform GAIN from Conservative	952
Burnley South West	Reform GAIN from Labour	1,071
Padiham & Burnley West	Reform GAIN from Conservative	332

Results summary for divisions in Chorley
Seat	Result	Majority
Chorley Central	Labour HOLD	7
Chorley North	Reform GAIN from Labour	156
Chorley Rural East	Labour HOLD	404
Chorley Rural West	Reform GAIN from Conservative	365
Chorley South	Reform GAIN from Labour	463
Clayton with Whittle	Labour HOLD	91
Euxton, Buckshaw & Astley	Conservative HOLD	30
Hoghton with Wheelton	Reform GAIN from Conservative	248

Results summary for divisions in Fylde
Seat	Result	Majority
Fylde East	Reform GAIN from Conservative	494
Fylde South	Reform GAIN from Conservative	184
Fylde West	Conservative HOLD	182
Lytham	Conservative HOLD	352
St Annes North	Conservative HOLD	1
St Annes South	Conservative HOLD	171

Results summary for divisions in Hyndburn
Seat	Result	Majority
Accrington North	Reform GAIN from Labour	932
Accrington South	Reform GAIN from Conservative	297
Accrington West & Oswaldtwistle Central	Green GAIN from Labour	133
Great Harwood, Rishton & Clayton-le-Moors (2-member division)	Reform GAIN from Labour	N/A
Great Harwood, Rishton & Clayton-le-Moors (2-member division)	Reform GAIN from Conservative	N/A
Oswaldtwistle	Reform GAIN from Conservative	8

Results summary for divisions in Lancaster
Seat	Result	Majority
Heysham	Reform GAIN from Conservative	727
Lancaster Central	Green HOLD	1,329
Lancaster East	Green GAIN from Labour	972
Lancaster Rural East	Reform GAIN from Conservative	31
Lancaster Rural North	Reform GAIN from Conservative	29
Lancaster South East	Green GAIN from Labour	910
Morecambe Central	Reform GAIN from Labour	185
Morecambe North	Reform GAIN from Conservative	861
Morecambe South	Reform GAIN from Conservative	788
Skerton	Reform GAIN from Labour	328

Results summary for divisions in Pendle
Seat	Result	Majority
Brierfield & Nelson West	Independent GAIN from Labour	2,396
Nelson East	Independent GAIN from Labour	874
Pendle Central	Reform GAIN from Conservative	549
Pendle Hill	Conservative HOLD	247
Pendle Rural (2-member division)	Liberal Democrat GAIN from Conservative	N/A
Pendle Rural (2-member division)	Reform GAIN from Conservative	N/A

Results summary for divisions in Preston
Seat	Result	Majority
Preston Central East	Independent GAIN from Labour	898
Preston Central West	Labour HOLD	86
Preston City	Independent GAIN from Labour	96
Preston East	Reform GAIN from Labour	433
Preston North	Liberal Democrat GAIN from Conservative	663
Preston Rural	Reform GAIN from Conservative	380
Preston South East	Independent GAIN from Labour	36
Preston South West	Liberal Democrat GAIN from Labour	266
Preston West	Liberal Democrat HOLD	502

Results summary for divisions in Ribble Valley
Seat	Result	Majority
Clitheroe	Reform GAIN from Conservative	417
Longridge with Bowland	Reform GAIN from Conservative	514
Ribble Valley North East	Reform GAIN from Conservative	674
Ribble Valley South West	Reform GAIN from Conservative	1,032

Results summary for divisions in Rossendale
Seat	Result	Majority
Mid Rossendale	Reform GAIN from Labour	603
Rossendale East	Reform GAIN from Labour	1,164
Rossendale South	Reform GAIN from Conservative	490
Rossendale West	Labour HOLD	30
Whitworth & Bacup	Reform GAIN from Conservative	241

Results summary for divisions in South Ribble
Seat	Result	Majority
Leyland Central	Reform GAIN from Labour	440
Leyland South	Reform GAIN from Conservative	497
Lostock Hall & Bamber Bridge	Reform GAIN from Conservative	242
Moss Side & Farington	Reform GAIN from Conservative	175
Penwortham East & Walton-le-Dale	Reform GAIN from Conservative	167
Penwortham West	Liberal Democrat HOLD	1,052
South Ribble East	Reform GAIN from Conservative	578
South Ribble West	Reform GAIN from Conservative	436

Results summary for divisions in West Lancashire
Seat	Result	Majority
Burscough & Rufford	Reform GAIN from Conservative	390
Ormskirk	OWL GAIN from Labour	536
Skelmersdale Central	Reform GAIN from Labour	441
Skelmersdale East	Reform GAIN from Labour	590
Skelmersdale West	Reform GAIN from Labour	560
West Lancashire East	OWL GAIN from Conservative	574
West Lancashire North	Conservative HOLD	362
West Lancashire West	Reform GAIN from Conservative	342

Results summary for divisions in Wyre
Seat	Result	Majority
Cleveleys East	Reform GAIN from Conservative	529
Cleveleys South & Carleton	Reform GAIN from Conservative	823
Fleetwood East	Reform GAIN from Labour	982
Fleetwood West & Cleveleys West	Reform GAIN from Conservative	1,222
Poulton-le-Fylde	Conservative HOLD	634
Thornton & Hambleton	Reform GAIN from Conservative	807
Wyre Rural Central	Reform GAIN from Conservative	179
Wyre Rural East	Reform GAIN from Conservative	370

== Division results by district ==
=== Burnley ===
Burnley district summary
Party	Seats	+/-	Votes	%	+/-
Reform UK	4	▲4	8,319	37.9	N/A
Independent	2	▲2	3,896	17.8	N/A
Conservative	0	▼2	3,769	17.2	–14.3
Labour	0	▼3	2,496	11.4	–18.9
Green	0	▼1	1,842	8.4	–6.1
Liberal Democrats	0	Steady	1,564	7.1	–9.6
Workers Party	0	Steady	39	0.2	N/A
Total	6	Steady	21,925	32.5	
Registered electors			67,435	–	

Division results

Burnley Central East
Party	Candidate	Votes	%	±%
Independent	Maheen Kamran	1,357	37.9	N/A
Reform	Gavin Theaker	1,089	30.4	N/A
Labour	Hannah Till	485	13.5	–35.9
Green	Alex Hall	292	8.1	–7.3
Conservative	Simon Bonney	255	7.1	–11.6
Independent	Javad Mokhammad	68	1.9	N/A
Workers Party	Rayyan Fiass	39	1.1	N/A
Majority		268	7.5	N/A
Turnout		3,585	30.2	
Registered electors		11,882		
Independent gain from Labour				

Burnley Central West
Party	Candidate	Votes	%	±%
Reform	Liam Thomson	1,387	43.3	N/A
Conservative	Don Whitaker	770	24.1	+0.3
Green	Martyn Hurt	516	16.1	–14.9
Labour	Dylan Manning	375	11.7	–3.6
Liberal Democrats	Frank Bartram	153	4.8	–6.3
Majority		617	19.2	N/A
Turnout		3,201	30.0	
Registered electors		10,655		
Reform gain from Green				

Burnley North East
Party	Candidate	Votes	%	±%
Independent	Usman Arif*	2,430	59.1	N/A
Reform	Jim Halstead	903	21.9	N/A
Labour	Cheryl Semple	372	9.0	–40.8
Conservative	Susan Nutter	242	5.9	–15.4
Green	Julie Hurt	168	4.1	–2.3
Majority		1,527	37.2	N/A
Turnout		4,115	37.1	
Registered electors		11,085		
Independent gain from Labour				

Burnley Rural
Party	Candidate	Votes	%	±%
Reform	Mark Poulton	1,798	42.9	N/A
Conservative	Cosima Towneley*	846	20.2	–18.5
Liberal Democrats	Gordon Birtwistle	823	19.6	+0.9
Green	Jack Launer	447	10.7	–13.4
Labour	Gemma Haigh	281	6.7	–6.6
Majority		952	22.7	N/A
Turnout		4,195	36.9	
Registered electors		11,357		
Reform gain from Conservative				

Burnley South West
Party	Candidate	Votes	%	±%
Reform	Eddie Kutavicius	1,659	48.2	N/A
Liberal Democrats	Jeff Sumner	588	17.1	–7.3
Conservative	Neil Mottershead	505	14.7	–8.2
Labour	Daniel Tierney	494	14.4	–10.2
Green	Jane Curran	194	5.6	+1.0
Majority		1,071	31.1	N/A
Turnout		3,440	29.0	
Registered electors		11,844		
Reform gain from Labour				

Padiham & Burnley West
Party	Candidate	Votes	%	±%
Reform	Thomas Pickup	1,483	43.8	N/A
Conservative	Alan Hosker*	1,151	34.0	–27.5
Labour	Daniel Armitage	489	14.4	–10.2
Green	Janet Hall	225	6.6	+1.5
Independent	Melissa Semmens	41	1.2	N/A
Majority		332	9.8	N/A
Turnout		3,389	31.9	
Registered electors		10,612		
Reform gain from Conservative				

=== Chorley ===
Chorley district summary
Party	Seats	+/-	Votes	%	+/-
Reform UK	4	▲4	10,863	36.5	N/A
Labour	3	▼2	9,639	32.4	–16.6
Conservative	1	▼2	5,290	17.8	–22.6
Green	0	Steady	2,658	8.9	+1.3
Liberal Democrats	0	Steady	988	3.3	+1.1
TUSC	0	Steady	271	0.9	N/A
Independent	0	Steady	23	0.1	–0.7
Total	8	Steady	29,732	33.8	
Registered electors			87,914	–	

Division results

Chorley Central
Party	Candidate	Votes	%	±%
Labour	Chris Snow	1,307	35.5	–21.2
Reform	Michaela Cmorej	1,300	35.3	N/A
Conservative	Peter Malpas	594	16.1	–17.6
Green	Debbie Brotherton	383	10.4	+1.7
TUSC	Jennifer Hurley	96	2.6	N/A
Majority		7	0.2	–22.8
Turnout		3,680	32.2	
Registered electors		11,434		
Labour hold				

Chorley North
Party	Candidate	Votes	%	±%
Reform	Martin Topp	1,140	41.1	N/A
Labour	Hasina Khan*	984	35.4	–23.9
Conservative	Sam Chapman	306	11.0	–17.3
Green	Anne Calderbank	251	9.0	–2.4
TUSC	Aamir Khansaheb	72	2.6	N/A
Independent	Moira Crawford	23	0.8	N/A
Majority		156	5.7	N/A
Turnout		2,776	27.9	
Registered electors		9,937		
Reform gain from Labour				

Chorley Rural East
Party	Candidate	Votes	%	±%
Labour Co-op	Kim Snape*	1,667	45.8	–15.0
Reform	Greg Heath	1,263	34.7	N/A
Conservative	Sue Baines	414	11.4	–21.8
Green	Simon Cash	179	4.9	–0.7
Liberal Democrats	David Golden	118	3.2	N/A
Majority		404	11.1	–16.5
Turnout		3,641	36.6	
Registered electors		9,944		
Labour Co-op hold				

Chorley Rural West
Party	Candidate	Votes	%	±%
Reform	Mark Wade	1,614	38.2	N/A
Labour	Alan Whittaker	1,249	29.5	–11.3
Conservative	Braeden Irvine	931	22.0	–26.1
Liberal Democrats	Rowan Power	252	6.0	+0.7
Green	Sef Churchill	182	4.3	–0.9
Majority		365	8.7	N/A
Turnout		4,228	39.0	
Registered electors		10,832		
Reform gain from Conservative				

Chorley South
Party	Candidate	Votes	%	±%
Reform	Lee Hutchinson	1,472	40.8	N/A
Green	Olga Cash	1,009	28.0	+15.7
Labour Co-op	Julia Berry*	825	22.9	–36.7
Conservative	Christine Turner	206	5.7	–21.6
Liberal Democrats	Zoe Curtis	98	2.7	N/A
Majority		463	12.8	N/A
Turnout		3,610	30.8	
Registered electors		11,883		
Reform gain from Labour Co-op				

Clayton with Whittle
Party	Candidate	Votes	%	±%
Labour	Mark Clifford*	1,411	37.2	–10.6
Reform	George Ikin	1,320	34.8	N/A
Conservative	Greg Morgan	653	17.2	–25.5
Liberal Democrats	Gail Ormston	198	5.2	+1.1
Green	Amy Coxley	187	4.9	+0.2
TUSC	Carole Sasaki	22	0.6	N/A
Majority		91	2.4	–2.7
Turnout		3,791	33.8	
Registered electors		11,219		
Labour hold				

Euxton, Buckshaw & Astley
Party	Candidate	Votes	%	±%
Conservative	Aidy Riggott*	1,507	33.0	–19.2
Reform	Jonathan Close	1,477	32.3	N/A
Labour	Frances Sharples	1,167	25.5	–9.2
Green	Pauline Summers	240	5.3	+0.6
Liberal Democrats	Mark Frost	147	3.2	+1.2
TUSC	Jacob Neal	30	0.7	N/A
Majority		30	0.7	N/A
Turnout		4,568	35.4	
Registered electors		12,921		
Conservative hold				

Hoghton with Wheelton
Party	Candidate	Votes	%	±%
Reform	John Clemson	1,277	37.1	N/A
Labour	Mike Graham	1,029	29.9	–6.8
Conservative	Alan Cullens*	679	19.7	–27.1
Green	Jon Royle	227	6.6	–3.8
Liberal Democrats	Stephen Fenn	175	5.1	±0.0
TUSC	Penelope Dawber	51	1.5	N/A
Majority		248	7.2	N/A
Turnout		3,439	35.3	
Registered electors		9,744		
Reform gain from Conservative				

=== Fylde ===
Fylde district summary
Party	Seats	+/-	Votes	%	+/-
Conservative	4	▼2	7,923	34.2	–21.5
Reform UK	2	▲2	7,160	30.9	N/A
Independent	0	Steady	3,358	14.5	–3.0
Labour	0	Steady	2,390	10.3	–5.0
Liberal Democrats	0	Steady	1,208	5.2	–3.2
Green	0	Steady	1,054	4.6	+1.4
ADF	0	Steady	71	0.3	N/A
Total	6	Steady	23,164	35.5	
Registered electors			65,336	–	

Division results

Fylde East
Party	Candidate	Votes	%	±%
Reform	Joshua Roberts	1,314	34.3	N/A
Independent	Peter Collins	820	21.4	–15.0
Conservative	Tony Wellings	767	20.0	–20.5
Independent	Edward Oldfield	455	11.9	N/A
Labour	Phil Glaysher	325	8.5	–8.3
Green	Brenden Wilkinson	148	3.9	N/A
Majority		494	12.9	N/A
Turnout		3,829	32.4	
Registered electors		11,836		
Reform gain from Conservative				

Fylde South
Party	Candidate	Votes	%	±%
Reform	David Dwyer	1,310	36.9	N/A
Conservative	Sandra Pitman	1,126	31.8	–29.2
Independent	Noreen Griffiths	477	13.5	N/A
Labour	Jed Sullivan	327	9.2	–2.0
Green	Jayne Walsh	306	8.6	–0.1
Majority		184	5.1	N/A
Turnout		3,546	33.7	
Registered electors		10,532		
Reform gain from Conservative				

Fylde West
Party	Candidate	Votes	%	±%
Conservative	John Singleton*	1,563	42.7	–26.3
Reform	Mark Qualter	1,381	37.7	N/A
Labour	Natalya Stone	447	12.2	–6.6
Green	Peter Walsh	272	7.4	N/A
Majority		182	5.0	–45.2
Turnout		3,663	34.3	
Registered electors		10,693		
Conservative hold				

Lytham
Party	Candidate	Votes	%	±%
Conservative	Tim Ashton*	1,868	40.1	–6.0
Independent	Mark Bamforth	1,516	32.5	–9.7
Reform	David Green	728	15.6	N/A
Labour	Alan Norris	262	5.6	–2.4
Liberal Democrats	Christine Marshall	115	2.5	–0.6
Independent	Carole Harrison	90	1.9	N/A
Green	Robin Darling	84	1.8	N/A
Majority		352	7.6	+3.7
Turnout		4,663	45.4	
Registered electors		10,264		
Conservative hold		Swing	▲1.9	

St Annes North
Party	Candidate	Votes	%	±%
Conservative	Peter Buckley*	1,224	33.98	–24.7
Reform	Debra Challinor	1,223	33.95	N/A
Liberal Democrats	Joanne Gardner	618	17.2	–6.6
Labour	Peter Tavernor	411	11.4	–5.6
Green	Peter Cranie	97	2.7	N/A
ADF	Valerie Lewis-Williams	29	0.8	N/A
Majority		1	0.03	–34.9
Turnout		3,602	33.4	
Registered electors		10,781		
Conservative hold				

St Annes South
Party	Candidate	Votes	%	±%
Conservative	Steve Rigby*	1,375	35.6	–32.9
Reform	Gus Scott	1,204	31.2	N/A
Labour	Viki Miller	618	16.0	–4.1
Liberal Democrats	Stephen Phillips	475	12.3	+4.3
Green	Maria Deery	147	3.8	–7.8
ADF	Cheryl Morrison	42	1.1	N/A
Majority		171	4.4	–35.0
Turnout		3,861	34.4	
Registered electors		11,230		
Conservative hold				

=== Hyndburn ===
Hyndburn district summary
Party	Seats	+/-	Votes	%	+/-
Reform UK	5	▲5	11,628	41.7	+38.4
Green	1	▲1	3,031	10.9	+5.6
Labour	0	▼3	7,064	25.3	–18.3
Conservative	0	▼3	6,159	22.1	–21.9
Total	6	Steady	27,882	34.9	
Registered electors			60,766	–	

Division results

Accrington North
Party	Candidate	Votes	%	±%
Reform	Joel Tetlow	1,615	52.2	N/A
Labour	Clare Pritchard	683	22.1	–31.1
Conservative	Shahed Mahmood	444	14.3	–19.4
Green	Julie Stubbins	355	11.5	+4.9
Majority		932	30.1	N/A
Turnout		3,097	30.0	
Registered electors		10,330		
Reform gain from Labour				

Accrington South
Party	Candidate	Votes	%	±%
Reform	Ashley Joynes	1,297	36.5	N/A
Conservative	David Heap	1,000	28.1	–21.2
Labour	Graham Jones	967	27.2	–16.0
Green	Charlie Kerans	292	8.2	+1.8
Majority		297	8.4	N/A
Turnout		3,556	35.9	
Registered electors		9,919		
Reform gain from Conservative				

Accrington West & Oswaldtwistle Central
Party	Candidate	Votes	%	±%
Green	Sohail Asghar	1,337	30.6	+24.6
Conservative	Mohammed Younis	1,204	27.5	–16.3
Labour	Munsif Dad*	1,058	24.2	–24.3
Reform	Isaac Cowans	765	17.5	N/A
Majority		133	3.1	N/A
Turnout		4,364	39.2	
Registered electors		11,144		
Green gain from Labour				

Great Harwood, Rishton & Clayton-le-Moors (2 seats)
Party	Candidate	Votes	%	±%
Reform	Jordan Fox	3,292	49.3	N/A
Reform	Lance Parkinson	3,184	47.7	N/A
Labour Co-op	Noordad Aziz*	2,153	32.2	–6.3
Labour Co-op	Kate Walsh	1,797	26.9	–8.3
Conservative	Carole Haythornthwaite*	1,208	18.1	–21.8
Conservative	Zak Khan	836	12.5	–21.4
Green	Wayne Fitzharris	582	8.7	+3.4
Green	Andy Hunter-Rossall	308	4.6	+1.0
Turnout		~6,680	33.9	
Registered electors		19,723		
Reform gain from Conservative				
Reform gain from Labour				

Oswaldtwistle
Party	Candidate	Votes	%	±%
Reform	Gaynor Hargreaves	1,475	42.1	+37.9
Conservative	Peter Britcliffe*	1,467	41.9	–12.8
Labour	Caitlin Pritchard	406	11.6	–24.4
Green	Nancy Mills	157	4.5	+1.4
Majority		8	0.2	N/A
Turnout		3,505	26.0	
Registered electors		9,650		
Reform gain from Conservative		Swing	▲25.4	

=== Lancaster ===
Lancaster district summary
Party	Seats	+/-	Votes	%	+/-
Reform UK	7	▲7	10,984	31.6	N/A
Green	3	▲2	8,699	25.0	+5.9
Labour	0	▼4	6,505	18.7	–15.5
Conservative	0	▼5	4,692	13.5	–20.1
Liberal Democrats	0	Steady	3,874	11.1	+2.3
Total	10	Steady	34,754	31.5	
Registered electors			110,193	–	

Division results

Heysham
Party	Candidate	Votes	%	±%
Reform	Graeme Austin	1,633	48.6	N/A
Labour	Catherine Potter	906	27.0	–7.2
Conservative	Andrew Gardiner*	511	15.2	–23.0
Green	George Thomson	159	4.7	–1.3
Liberal Democrats	Sheldon Kent	149	4.4	+2.0
Majority		727	21.6	N/A
Turnout		3,358	29.7	
Registered electors		11,319		
Reform gain from Conservative				

Lancaster Central
Party	Candidate	Votes	%	±%
Green	Gina Dowding*	2,157	57.2	–2.4
Reform	Rob Kelly	765	20.3	N/A
Labour	Fran Wild	500	13.3	–10.2
Conservative	Thomas Inman	235	6.2	–10.0
Liberal Democrats	Derek Kaye	112	3.0	N/A
Majority		1,392	36.9	+0.6
Turnout		3,769	34.8	
Registered electors		10,837		
Green hold				

Lancaster East
Party	Candidate	Votes	%	±%
Green	Paul Stubbins	1,822	54.0	+13.3
Labour	Sam Charlesworth	850	25.2	–21.1
Reform	Michael Kershaw	496	14.7	N/A
Conservative	Connor Winter	118	3.5	–6.4
Liberal Democrats	Phil Dunster	87	2.6	+0.7
Majority		972	28.8	N/A
Turnout		3,373	28.3	
Registered electors		11,907		
Green gain from Labour		Swing	▲17.2	

Lancaster Rural East
Party	Candidate	Votes	%	±%
Reform	Shaun Crimmins	1,149	26.3	N/A
Liberal Democrats	Peter Jackson	1,118	25.6	+2.0
Conservative	Matthew Maxwell-Scott*	920	21.0	–22.3
Green	Sally Maddocks	742	17.0	+8.6
Labour Co-op	Geoff Eales	445	10.2	–14.0
Majority		31	0.7	N/A
Turnout		4,374	40.9	
Registered electors		10,700		
Reform gain from Conservative				

Lancaster Rural North
Party	Candidate	Votes	%	±%
Reform	Graham Dalton	1,159	30.2	N/A
Conservative	Phillippa Williamson*	1,130	29.5	–26.1
Green	Sue Tyldesley	713	18.6	+8.9
Labour Co-op	Sonny Remmer-Riley	440	11.5	–15.2
Liberal Democrats	Alan Greenwell	391	10.2	+3.1
Majority		29	0.7	N/A
Turnout		3,833	38.0	
Registered electors		10,080		
Reform gain from Conservative				

Lancaster South East
Party	Candidate	Votes	%	±%
Green	Hamish Mills	1,719	50.4	+25.3
Labour Co-op	Erica Lewis*	809	23.7	–25.1
Reform	Lee Garner	590	17.3	N/A
Conservative	Daniel Kirk	193	5.7	–14.2
Liberal Democrats	Malcolm Martin	102	3.0	–2.6
Majority		910	26.7	N/A
Turnout		3,413	29.5	
Registered electors		11,564		
Green gain from Labour		Swing	▲25.2	

Morecambe Central
Party	Candidate	Votes	%	±%
Reform	Gary Kniveton	1,104	37.9	N/A
Liberal Democrats	Paul Hart	919	31.5	–4.1
Labour	Margaret Pattison*	656	22.5	–13.2
Conservative	Connor Graham	119	4.1	–14.8
Green	Patrick McMurray	118	4.0	+1.0
Majority		185	6.4	N/A
Turnout		2,916	24.8	
Registered electors		11,781		
Reform gain from Labour				

Morecambe North
Party	Candidate	Votes	%	±%
Reform	Russell Walsh	1,613	41.7	N/A
Conservative	Stuart Morris*	752	19.5	–37.8
Labour	Jackson Stubbs	696	18.0	–9.0
Liberal Democrats	James Pilling	449	11.6	+6.1
Green	Sara-Louise Dobson	355	9.2	–0.4
Majority		861	22.2	N/A
Turnout		3,865	37.6	
Registered electors		10,279		
Reform gain from Conservative				

Morecambe South
Party	Candidate	Votes	%	±%
Reform	Brian Moore	1,407	45.7	N/A
Labour	Martin Gawith	619	20.1	–14.0
Conservative	Keith Budden	453	14.7	–30.2
Liberal Democrats	Bill Jackson	429	13.9	+11.2
Green	Melanie Forrest	174	5.6	+2.8
Majority		788	25.6	N/A
Turnout		3,082	26.7	
Registered electors		11,564		
Reform gain from Conservative				

Skerton
Party	Candidate	Votes	%	±%
Reform	Martyn Sutton	1,068	38.5	N/A
Green	Andrew Otway	740	26.7	+17.9
Labour Co-op	Hilda Parr*	584	21.1	–26.5
Conservative	Charles Edwards	261	9.4	–19.8
Liberal Democrats	James Harvey	118	4.3	–0.2
Majority		328	11.8	N/A
Turnout		2,771	27.3	
Registered electors		10,162		
Reform gain from Labour Co-op				

=== Pendle ===
Pendle district summary
Party	Seats	+/-	Votes	%	+/-
Reform UK	2	▲2	8,943	28.4	N/A
Independent	2	▲2	4,904	15.5	N/A
Conservative	1	▼3	7,753	24.6	–21.8
Liberal Democrats	1	▲1	6,571	20.8	–0.6
Labour	0	▼2	2,193	7.0	–21.6
Green	0	Steady	1,158	3.7	+0.1
UKIP	0	Steady	18	0.1	N/A
Total	6	Steady	31,540	34.9	
Registered electors			68,581	–	

Division results

Brierfield & Nelson West
Party	Candidate	Votes	%	±%
Independent	Mohammed Iqbal*	2,928	65.7	N/A
Reform	Christine Stables	532	11.9	N/A
Conservative	Irfan Ayub	518	11.6	–26.0
Labour Co-op	Karl Barnsley	262	5.9	–49.9
Green	Scott Cunliffe	113	2.5	–0.5
Liberal Democrats	Susan Land	105	2.4	–0.1
Majority		2,396	53.8	N/A
Turnout		4,458	35.4	
Registered electors		12,586		
Independent gain from Labour				

Nelson East
Party	Candidate	Votes	%	±%
Independent	Azhar Ali*	1,976	44.9	N/A
Conservative	Mohammed Aslam	1,102	25.1	–9.9
Reform	Vanessa Robinson	772	17.6	N/A
Labour	Nicki Shepherd	305	6.9	–49.8
Liberal Democrats	Mary Thomas	122	2.8	–0.8
Green	Rebecca Willmott	101	2.3	–1.4
UKIP	Les Beswick	18	0.4	N/A
Majority		874	19.8	N/A
Turnout		4,396	35.9	
Registered electors		12,250		
Independent gain from Labour				

Pendle Central
Party	Candidate	Votes	%	±%
Reform	Marion Atkinson	1,417	42.4	N/A
Conservative	Ash Sutcliffe*	868	26.0	–26.4
Liberal Democrats	Andy Bell	694	20.8	–8.9
Labour	Philip Heyworth	245	7.3	–9.6
Green	Benjamin Harrop	118	3.5	N/A
Majority		549	16.4	N/A
Turnout		3,342	30.7	
Registered electors		10,881		
Reform gain from Conservative				

Pendle Hill
Party	Candidate	Votes	%	±%
Conservative	Howard Hartley	1,599	38.3	–17.0
Reform	John Metcalfe	1,352	32.4	N/A
Labour	Mark Dawson	551	13.2	–16.9
Liberal Democrats	Brian Newman	467	11.2	–2.3
Green	Annette Marti	206	4.9	N/A
Majority		157	5.9	N/A
Turnout		4,175	36.2	
Registered electors		11,549		
Conservative hold				

Pendle Rural (2 seats)
Party	Candidate	Votes	%	±%
Liberal Democrats	David Whipp	2,869	37.8	–2.5
Reform	Nathan McCollum	2,454	32.4	N/A
Reform	Victoria Fletcher	2,416	31.9	N/A
Liberal Democrats	David Hartley	2,314	30.5	+1.5
Conservative	Jenny Purcell*	1,977	26.1	–21.3
Conservative	Jane Pratt	1,689	22.3	–21.2
Labour	Euan Clouston	431	5.7	–8.1
Labour	Lynn Hannon	399	5.3	N/A
Green	Sylvia Godfrey	327	4.3	–6.6
Green	Jane Wood	293	3.9	N/A
Turnout		~7,585	35.6	
Registered electors		21,315		
Liberal Democrats gain from Conservative				
Reform gain from Conservative				

=== Preston ===
Preston district summary
Party	Seats	+/-	Votes	%	+/-
Liberal Democrats	3	▲2	7,498	23.8	+8.8
Independent	3	▲3	3,799	12.1	+8.4
Reform UK	2	▲2	8,749	27.8	N/A
Labour	1	▼5	6,064	19.3	–25.5
Conservative	0	▼2	3,931	12.5	–23.6
Green	0	Steady	1,377	4.4	N/A
TUSC	0	Steady	48	0.2	N/A
Total	9	Steady	31,466	28.3	
Registered electors			111,297	–	

Division results

Preston Central East
Party	Candidate	Votes	%	±%
Independent	Michael Lavalette	1,782	47.9	N/A
Labour	Frank de Molfetta*	884	23.8	–51.2
Reform	Darrin Greggans	556	14.9	N/A
Liberal Democrats	George Kulbacki	204	5.5	–0.3
Conservative	Al-Yasa Khan	189	5.1	–12.9
Green	Callum Taylor	107	2.9	N/A
Majority		898	24.1	N/A
Turnout		3,722	30.7	
Registered electors		12,116		
Independent gain from Labour				

Preston Central West
Party	Candidate	Votes	%	±%
Labour Co-op	Matthew Brown*	799	31.2	–23.1
Reform	Jos Custodio	713	27.8	N/A
Liberal Democrats	Mike Peak	578	22.6	+3.8
Conservative	Frankie Kennedy	264	10.3	–15.6
Green	Jennifer Robinson	209	8.2	N/A
Majority		86	3.4	–25.0
Turnout		2,563	19.3	
Registered electors		13,282		
Labour Co-op hold				

Preston City
Party	Candidate	Votes	%	±%
Independent	Yousuf Motala*	989	33.7	N/A
Labour Co-op	Connor Dwyer	893	30.5	–36.5
Reform	Scott Pye	476	16.2	N/A
Green	Holly Harrison	194	6.6	N/A
Conservative	Tayo Korede	193	6.6	–13.9
Liberal Democrats	Julie van Mierlo	186	6.3	–1.0
Majority		96	3.2	N/A
Turnout		2,931	23.1	
Registered electors		12,692		
Independent gain from Labour				

Preston East
Party	Candidate	Votes	%	±%
Reform	Luke Parker	1,181	43.3	N/A
Labour Co-op	Anna Hindle*	748	27.4	–25.2
Conservative	Keith Sedgewick	364	13.3	–26.6
Liberal Democrats	Edward Craven	242	8.9	+2.4
Green	John Ross	146	5.3	N/A
TUSC	Geoffrey Fielden	48	1.8	N/A
Majority		433	15.9	N/A
Turnout		2,729	25.0	
Registered electors		10,927		
Reform gain from Labour Co-op				

Preston North
Party	Candidate	Votes	%	±%
Liberal Democrats	Fiona Duke	1,601	38.8	+19.8
Reform	Alex Sharples	938	22.7	N/A
Conservative	Maxwell Green	736	17.8	–31.9
Labour	Samir Vohra	513	12.4	–18.1
Independent	Qasim Ajmi	220	5.3	N/A
Green	Charles Parkinson	122	3.0	N/A
Majority		663	16.1	N/A
Turnout		4,130	36.5	
Registered electors		11,325		
Liberal Democrats gain from Conservative				

Preston Rural
Party	Candidate	Votes	%	±%
Reform	Maria Jones	1,876	34.6	N/A
Liberal Democrats	Daniel Guise	1,496	27.6	+17.8
Conservative	Sue Whittam*	1,253	23.1	−43.0
Labour Co-op	Valerie Wise	559	10.30	−12.7
Green	Millie Barber	245	4.5	N/A
Majority		380	7.0	N/A
Turnout		5,429	34.2	
Registered electors		15,876		
Reform gain from Conservative				

Preston South East
Party	Candidate	Votes	%	±%
Independent	Almas Razakazi	750	29.3	N/A
Reform	Nigel Wilson	714	27.9	N/A
Labour Co-op	Jenny Mein*	709	27.7	–40.3
Conservative	Andy Pratt	152	5.9	–12.4
Liberal Democrats	John Rutter	128	5.0	±0.0
Green	Marion Seed	104	4.1	N/A
Majority		36	1.4	N/A
Turnout		2,557	21.4	
Registered electors		11,928		
Independent gain from Labour				

Preston South West
Party	Candidate	Votes	%	±%
Liberal Democrats	Mark Jewell	1,411	39.7	+28.9
Reform	Lee Slater	1,145	32.2	N/A
Labour	Nweeda Khan*	638	18.0	–19.9
Conservative	Kevin Brockbank	183	5.2	–18.8
Green	Laura Dalton	116	3.3	N/A
Independent	Emma Mead	58	1.6	N/A
Majority		266	7.5	N/A
Turnout		3,551	32.4	
Registered electors		10,950		
Liberal Democrats gain from Labour				

Preston West
Party	Candidate	Votes	%	±%
Liberal Democrats	John Potter*	1,652	42.9	–0.2
Reform	Jemma Rushe	1,150	29.8	N/A
Conservative	Trevor Hart	597	15.5	–24.0
Labour	Michael McGowan	321	8.3	–8.3
Green	Dan Thompson	134	3.5	N/A
Majority		502	13.1	+9.5
Turnout		3,854	31.6	
Registered electors		12,201		
Liberal Democrats hold				

=== Ribble Valley ===
Ribble Valley district summary
Party	Seats	+/-	Votes	%	+/-
Reform UK	4	▲4	7,183	37.9	N/A
Conservative	0	▼4	4,145	21.8	–31.3
Labour	0	Steady	2,849	15.0	–2.8
Independent	0	Steady	1,915	10.1	+0.3
Liberal Democrats	0	Steady	1,700	9.0	–3.3
Green	0	Steady	1,183	6.2	–0.9
Total	4	Steady	18,975	38.4	
Registered electors			49,420	–	

Division results

Clitheroe
Party	Candidate	Votes	%	±%
Reform	Warren Goldsworthy	1,516	31.5	N/A
Liberal Democrats	Simon O'Rourke	1,099	22.8	–6.6
Conservative	Sue Hind*	778	16.2	–13.5
Labour	Mike Graveston	720	15.0	–1.6
Independent	Ian Brown	472	9.8	–9.2
Green	Anne Peplow	225	4.7	±0.0
Majority		417	8.7	N/A
Turnout		4,810	35.5	
Registered electors		13,553		
Reform gain from Conservative				

Longridge with Bowland
Party	Candidate	Votes	%	±%
Reform	Ian Duxbury	1,534	34.4	N/A
Labour	Kieren Spencer	1,020	22.9	+2.9
Conservative	Stuart Hirst	940	21.1	–42.5
Independent	Robert Walker	666	14.9	N/A
Green	Adam McMeekin	160	3.6	–6.6
Liberal Democrats	Peter Lawrence	136	3.1	–2.3
Majority		514	11.5	N/A
Turnout		4,456	39.3	
Registered electors		11,333		
Reform gain from Conservative				

Ribble Valley North East
Party	Candidate	Votes	%	±%
Reform	Ged Mirfin*	1,959	38.4	N/A
Conservative	David Berryman	1,285	25.2	–27.3
Green	Malcolm Peplow	582	11.4	+5.0
Labour	Mike Willcox	557	10.9	–7.0
Independent	David Birtwhistle	476	9.3	–8.2
Liberal Democrats	Stephen Sutcliffe	239	4.7	±0.0
Majority		674	13.2	N/A
Turnout		5,098	39.1	
Registered electors		13,054		
Reform gain from Conservative				

Ribble Valley South West
Party	Candidate	Votes	%	±%
Reform	Stephen Atkinson	2,174	47.1	N/A
Conservative	Alan Schofield*	1,142	24.8	–41.7
Labour	Richard Horton	552	12.0	–4.0
Independent	John Fletcher	301	6.5	N/A
Liberal Democrats	Mary Robinson	226	4.9	–4.0
Green	Gaye McCrum	216	4.7	–2.7
Majority		1,032	22.3	N/A
Turnout		4,611	40.2	
Registered electors		11,480		
Reform gain from Conservative				

=== Rossendale ===
Rossendale district summary
Party	Seats	+/-	Votes	%	+/-
Reform UK	4	▲4	8,237	43.5	N/A
Labour	1	▼2	4,929	26.1	–15.9
Conservative	0	▼2	3,745	19.8	–21.1
Green	0	Steady	1,814	9.6	+5.5
Liberal Democrats	0	Steady	196	1.0	N/A
Total	5	Steady	18,921	36.3	
Registered electors			52,175	–	

Division results

Mid Rossendale
Party	Candidate	Votes	%	±%
Reform	Clive Balchin	1,895	43.7	N/A
Labour Co-op	Sean Serridge*	1,292	29.8	–20.4
Conservative	John Greenwood	682	15.7	–33.1
Green	Bob Bauld	466	10.7	N/A
Majority		603	13.9	N/A
Turnout		4,335	37.3	
Registered electors		11,623		
Reform gain from Labour				

Rossendale East
Party	Candidate	Votes	%	±%
Reform	Mackenzie Kitson	1,963	51.6	N/A
Labour	Jackie Oakes*	799	21.0	–20.2
Green	Julie Adshead	516	13.6	+6.8
Conservative	Jenny Rigby	333	8.7	–17.2
Liberal Democrats	Mark Hillier	196	5.1	N/A
Majority		1,162	30.6	N/A
Turnout		3,807	37.4	
Registered electors		10,182		
Reform gain from Labour				

Rossendale South
Party	Candidate	Votes	%	±%
Reform	Joanne Ash	1,512	41.1	N/A
Labour Co-op	Liz McInnes	1,022	27.8	–13.0
Conservative	Simon Holland	802	21.8	–27.9
Green	John Payne	346	9.4	+0.6
Majority		490	13.3	N/A
Turnout		3,682	38.0	
Registered electors		9,680		
Reform gain from Conservative				

Rossendale West
Party	Candidate	Votes	%	±%
Labour Co-op	Samara Barnes*	1,364	37.8	–5.9
Reform	Jamie Rippingale	1,334	37.0	N/A
Conservative	Margaret Pendlebury	636	17.6	–24.2
Green	Jacob Rorke	276	7.6	N/A
Majority		30	0.8	N/A
Turnout		3,610	34.2	
Registered electors		10,557		
Labour Co-op hold				

Whitworth & Bacup
Party	Candidate	Votes	%	±%
Reform	Daniel Matchett	1,533	44.0	N/A
Conservative	Scott Smith*	1,292	37.1	+4.2
Labour	Michelle Smith	452	13.0	–15.3
Green	Vivienne Hall	210	6.0	–0.5
Majority		241	6.9	N/A
Turnout		3,487	34.4	
Registered electors		10,133		
Reform gain from Conservative				

=== South Ribble ===
South Ribble district summary
Party	Seats	+/-	Votes	%	+/-
Reform UK	7	▲7	11,527	37.7	N/A
Liberal Democrats	1	Steady	3,891	12.7	–0.6
Conservative	0	▼6	7,170	23.5	–26.9
Labour	0	▼1	6,624	21.7	–12.5
Green	0	Steady	1,304	4.3	+2.4
TUSC	0	Steady	49	0.2	N/A
Total	8	Steady	30,565	34.6	
Registered electors			88,341	–	

Division results

Leyland Central
Party	Candidate	Votes	%	±%
Reform	Hannah Whalley	1,539	45.6	N/A
Labour Co-op	Matthew Tomlinson*	1,099	32.6	–21.5
Conservative	Mary Green	399	11.8	–25.8
Liberal Democrats	Alan Swindells	195	5.8	+2.8
Green	Emma Winterleigh	118	3.5	–1.0
TUSC	Arif Khansaheb	23	0.7	N/A
Majority		440	13.0	N/A
Turnout		3,373	31.4	
Registered electors		10,731		
Reform gain from Labour				

Leyland South
Party	Candidate	Votes	%	±%
Reform	Ellie Close	1,456	40.2	N/A
Labour	Wes Roberts	959	26.5	–14.2
Conservative	Jayne Rear*	756	20.9	–26.6
Liberal Democrats	Stephen McHugh	271	7.5	–3.4
Green	Ceri Turner	153	4.2	N/A
TUSC	Tahir Khansaheb	26	0.7	N/A
Majority		506	13.7	N/A
Turnout		3,621	34.0	
Registered electors		10,642		
Reform gain from Conservative				

Lostock Hall & Bamber Bridge
Party	Candidate	Votes	%	±%
Reform	Simon Gummer	1,331	37.4	N/A
Conservative	Jeff Couperthwaite*	1,089	30.6	–20.8
Labour	Clare Hunter	846	23.7	–20.2
Green	Samuel Winterleigh	149	4.2	N/A
Liberal Democrats	Tim Young	148	4.2	–0.2
Majority		242	6.8	N/A
Turnout		3,563	32.5	
Registered electors		10,976		
Reform gain from Conservative				

Moss Side & Farington
Party	Candidate	Votes	%	±%
Reform	Andy Blake	1,371	36.8	N/A
Conservative	Michael Green*	1,196	32.1	–28.4
Labour Co-op	Paul Wharton-Hardman	881	23.6	–3.2
Liberal Democrats	Graham Smith	157	4.2	+0.2
Green	Anthony Sims	121	3.2	–3.2
Majority		175	4.7	N/A
Turnout		3,726	33.3	
Registered electors		11,191		
Reform gain from Conservative				

Penwortham East & Walton-le-Dale
Party	Candidate	Votes	%	±%
Reform	Lorenzo More	1,223	35.9	N/A
Conservative	Joan Burrows*	1,056	31.0	–20.8
Labour Co-op	Elaine Stringfellow	720	21.2	–20.2
Green	Sue Broady	214	6.3	N/A
Liberal Democrats	Clare Burton-Johnson	191	5.6	–0.2
Majority		167	4.9	N/A
Turnout		3,404	32.0	
Registered electors		10,627		
Reform gain from Conservative				

Penwortham West
Party	Candidate	Votes	%	±%
Liberal Democrats	David Howarth*	2,281	50.4	+1.1
Reform	Wayne Griffiths	1,229	27.1	N/A
Labour Co-op	Ian Watkinson	549	12.1	–6.1
Conservative	Paul Watson	310	6.8	–21.1
Green	Heike McMurray	158	3.5	–0.7
Majority		1,052	23.3	+1.8
Turnout		4,527	39.6	
Registered electors		11,435		
Liberal Democrats hold				

South Ribble East
Party	Candidate	Votes	%	±%
Reform	Fred Cottam	1,560	40.5	N/A
Conservative	Barrie Yates*	982	25.5	–35.4
Labour Co-op	Chris Lomax	940	24.4	–7.5
Liberal Democrats	Paul Valentine	190	4.9	–1.5
Green	Clare Hales	184	4.8	N/A
Majority		578	15.0	N/A
Turnout		3,856	32.7	
Registered electors		11,777		
Reform gain from Conservative				

South Ribble West
Party	Candidate	Votes	%	±%
Reform	Tom Lord	1,818	40.4	N/A
Conservative	Gareth Watson	1,382	30.7	–37.4
Labour Co-op	James Gleeson	630	14.0	–9.3
Liberal Democrats	Angela Turner	458	10.2	+2.4
Green	Christine Winter	207	4.6	N/A
Majority		436	9.7	N/A
Turnout		4,495	41.0	
Registered electors		10,962		
Reform gain from Conservative				

=== West Lancashire ===
West Lancashire district summary
Party	Seats	+/-	Votes	%	+/-
Reform UK	5	▲5	10,018	34.4	N/A
OWL	2	▲2	4,066	14.0	+5.0
Conservative	1	▼3	5,618	19.3	–18.9
Labour	0	▼4	6,239	21.4	–20.0
Green	0	Steady	1,854	6.4	+4.9
Liberal Democrats	0	Steady	1,307	4.5	–0.3
Total	8	Steady	29,102	32.6	
Registered electors			89,183	–	

Division results

Burscough & Rufford
Party	Candidate	Votes	%	±%
Reform	Richard Edwards	1,416	35.5	N/A
Labour Co-op	Gareth Dowling	1,026	25.7	–16.1
Conservative	Eddie Pope*	996	24.9	–25.3
Liberal Democrats	Neil Pollington	313	7.8	+0.7
Green	Jeanette Rimmer	243	6.1	N/A
Majority		390	9.8	N/A
Turnout		3,994	36.3	
Registered electors		11,015		
Reform gain from Conservative				

Ormskirk
Party	Candidate	Votes	%	±%
OWL	Gordon Johnson	1,585	39.8	+7.0
Labour Co-op	Nikki Hennessy*	1,049	26.4	–20.1
Reform	Paul Greenall	851	21.4	N/A
Conservative	Bruce Porteous	287	7.2	–10.5
Green	Paul Hamby	206	5.2	N/A
Majority		536	13.5	N/A
Turnout		3,985	35.8	
Registered electors		11,134		
OWL gain from Labour		Swing	▲13.6	

Skelmersdale Central
Party	Candidate	Votes	%	±%
Reform	Simon Evans	1,171	47.3	N/A
Labour Co-op	Terence Aldridge*	730	29.5	–34.7
Green	Neil Jackson	285	11.5	+8.8
Liberal Democrats	Vincent Lucker	191	7.7	+6.4
Conservative	Susan Brake	101	4.1	–6.2
Majority		441	17.8	N/A
Turnout		2,478	22.3	
Registered electors		11,092		
Reform gain from Labour Co-op				

Skelmersdale East
Party	Candidate	Votes	%	±%
Reform	Nigel Swales	1,420	41.6	N/A
Labour Co-op	John Fillis*	830	24.3	–20.8
OWL	Neil Pye	465	13.6	N/A
Conservative	Julie Peel	408	12.0	–23.5
Green	Paul French	290	8.5	–1.4
Majority		590	17.3	N/A
Turnout		3,413	31.0	
Registered electors		11,019		
Reform gain from Labour Co-op		Swing		

Skelmersdale West
Party	Candidate	Votes	%	±%
Reform	Ella Worthington	1,304	41.8	N/A
Labour Co-op	Julie Gibson*	744	23.8	–34.2
OWL	Tom Marsh-Pritchard	544	17.4	N/A
Green	Edwin Black	205	6.6	N/A
Liberal Democrats	Peter Chandler	205	6.6	+0.6
Conservative	Ruth Melling	119	3.8	–10.2
Majority		560	18.0	N/A
Turnout		3,121	27.5	
Registered electors		11,355		
Reform gain from Labour Co-op				

West Lancashire East
Party	Candidate	Votes	%	±%
OWL	Adrian Owens	1,472	37.2	+5.8
Reform	Ellis Newton	898	22.7	N/A
Conservative	Robert Bailey*	729	18.4	–23.0
Labour	Damian Owen	632	16.0	–7.3
Green	Richard Taylor	222	5.6	N/A
Majority		574	14.5	N/A
Turnout		3,953	36.0	
Registered electors		10,983		
OWL gain from Conservative				

West Lancashire North
Party	Candidate	Votes	%	±%
Conservative	Thomas de Freitas	2,000	42.5	–25.8
Reform	Mike Harris	1,638	34.8	N/A
Labour	Anne Fennell	498	10.6	–14.2
Liberal Democrats	Tina Stringfellow	400	8.5	+2.4
Green	Charlotte Houltram	169	3.6	N/A
Majority		362	7.7	N/A
Turnout		4,705	38.8	
Registered electors		12,113		
Conservative hold				

West Lancashire West
Party	Candidate	Votes	%	±%
Reform	Leon Graham	1,320	38.2	N/A
Conservative	David Westley*	978	28.3	–28.7
Labour	Paul Hennessy	730	21.1	–12.0
Green	Ben Lowe	234	6.8	N/A
Liberal Democrats	Ruxandra Trandafoiu	198	5.7	–3.3
Majority		342	9.9	N/A
Turnout		3,460	33.0	
Registered electors		10,472		
Reform gain from Conservative				

=== Wyre ===
Wyre district summary
Party	Seats	+/-	Votes	%	+/-
Reform UK	7	▲7	14,096	44.3	+44.0
Conservative	1	▼6	9,553	30.0	–31.6
Labour	0	▼1	5,422	17.0	–10.0
Green	0	Steady	1,675	5.3	–0.2
Liberal Democrats	0	Steady	929	2.9	–0.2
Independent	0	Steady	129	0.4	–1.9
Total	8	Steady	31,804	37.2	
Registered electors			88,268	–	

Division results

Cleveleys East
Party	Candidate	Votes	%	±%
Reform	James Crawford	1,631	47.2	N/A
Conservative	Andrea Kay*	1,102	31.9	–36.2
Labour	Harry Swatton	557	16.1	–7.7
Green	Sarah Punshon	168	4.9	+0.5
Majority		529	15.3	N/A
Turnout		3,458	33.3	
Registered electors		10,399		
Reform gain from Conservative				

Cleveleys South & Carleton
Party	Candidate	Votes	%	±%
Reform	Jan Schofield	1,764	45.9	N/A
Conservative	Ian Northwood	941	24.5	–34.2
Labour	Peter Wright	781	20.3	–9.7
Green	Luke Meeks	227	5.9	+0.1
Liberal Democrats	Rebecca Potter	127	3.3	–1.2
Majority		823	21.4	N/A
Turnout		3,840	36.9	
Registered electors		10,400		
Reform gain from Conservative				

Fleetwood East
Party	Candidate	Votes	%	±%
Reform	David Shaw	1,782	53.7	+50.6
Labour	Victoria Wells	800	24.1	–29.3
Conservative	JJ Fitzgerald	535	16.1	–10.5
Green	Daniel Bye	127	3.8	–0.1
Liberal Democrats	Sandra Finch	75	2.3	+1.0
Majority		982	29.6	N/A
Turnout		3,319	31.5	
Registered electors		10,528		
Reform gain from Labour		Swing	▲40.0	

Fleetwood West & Cleveleys West
Party	Candidate	Votes	%	±%
Reform	Alice Jones	1,928	54.7	N/A
Conservative	Stephen Clarke*	706	20.0	–32.3
Labour	Mary Belshaw	643	18.2	–14.5
Green	Georgia Everill	139	3.9	+0.5
Liberal Democrats	Joanne Joyner	108	3.1	+1.9
Majority		1,222	34.7	N/A
Turnout		3,524	32.8	
Registered electors		10,736		
Reform gain from Conservative				

Poulton-le-Fylde
Party	Candidate	Votes	%	±%
Conservative	Alf Clempson*	1,857	45.2	–23.9
Reform	Paul Ellison	1,223	29.8	N/A
Labour	Cheryl Raynor	597	14.5	–6.8
Green	Barbara Mead-Mason	250	6.1	+0.2
Liberal Democrats	Sean Little	127	3.1	+0.3
Independent	Jayden Gaskin	50	1.2	N/A
Majority		634	15.4	–32.5
Turnout		4,104	34.3	
Registered electors		11,959		
Conservative hold				

Thornton & Hambleton
Party	Candidate	Votes	%	±%
Reform	Nigel Alderson	1,816	47.6	N/A
Conservative	John Shedwick*	1,009	26.4	–45.8
Labour	James Mason	664	17.4	–5.7
Green	Monique Rembowski	184	4.8	N/A
Liberal Democrats	Jeremy Dable	144	3.8	–0.4
Majority		807	21.2	N/A
Turnout		3,817	35.6	
Registered electors		10,722		
Reform gain from Conservative				

Wyre Rural Central
Party	Candidate	Votes	%	±%
Reform	Matthew Salter*	1,830	41.4	N/A
Conservative	Paul Fairhurst	1,651	37.3	–29.5
Labour	John Moore	483	10.9	–8.8
Green	Tom Briggs	270	6.1	–4.1
Liberal Democrats	Rene van Mierlo	112	2.5	–0.1
Independent	Sarah Collinge	79	1.8	N/A
Majority		179	4.1	N/A
Turnout		4,425	40.9	
Registered electors		10,828		
Reform gain from Conservative				

Wyre Rural East
Party	Candidate	Votes	%	±%
Reform	James Tomlinson	2,122	39.9	N/A
Conservative	Shaun Turner*	1,752	33.0	–34.7
Labour Co-op	Oliver Bonser	897	16.9	–0.3
Green	Caroline Montague	310	5.8	–3.0
Liberal Democrats	Neil Darby	236	4.4	–0.2
Majority		370	6.9	N/A
Turnout		5,317	41.9	
Registered electors		12,696		
Reform gain from Conservative				

== See also ==
- Lancashire County Council elections
