= Stephen Atkinson (politician) =

British politician

Councillor Stephen Atkinson

Leader of Lancashire County Council
- Incumbent
- Assumed office 22 May 2025
- Deputy: Simon Evans
- Preceded by: Phillippa Williamson

Chair of the Lancashire Combined County Authority
- Incumbent
- Assumed office 17 June 2025
- Preceded by: Phillippa Williamson

Leader of the Reform UK Group on the Local Government Association
- Incumbent
- Assumed office 2025

Member of Lancashire County Council for Ribble Valley South West
- Incumbent
- Assumed office 1 May 2025

Leader of Ribble Valley Borough Council
- In office 15 January 2019 – March 2025
- Preceded by: Ken Hind
- Succeeded by: Simon Hore

Personal details
- Born: Lancashire, England
- Party: Reform UK (since 2025)
- Other political affiliations: Conservative Party (until 2025)
- Children: 2
- Occupation: Businessman

Stephen Alexis Atkinson (born June 1969) is a British politician who has served as the Leader of Lancashire County Council since 22 May 2025. A member of Reform UK, he is also the chair of the Lancashire Combined County Authority and leader of the Reform UK group at the Local Government Association. He previously served as leader of Ribble Valley Borough Council from 2019 to 2025.

== Early life and career ==
Born in Lancashire in June 1969, Atkinson is a self-trained engineer and businessman. He started his first business venture with his brother at the age of 21. Together they run a Lancashire-based educational furniture business and invest in commercial and industrial properties in the area.

== Political career ==
Atkinson was first elected as a district councillor in 2015 for the Brockhall & Dinckley ward on Ribble Valley Borough Council. He served in various roles including Chair of Policy and Finance. He was leader of Ribble Valley Borough Council from January 2019 until March 2025.

In March 2025, Atkinson defected from the Conservative Party to Reform UK and resigned as leader of Ribble Valley Borough Council.

=== Lancashire County Council ===
At the 2025 Lancashire County Council election on 1 May 2025, Atkinson was elected as the county councillor for the Ribble Valley South West division, receiving 2,174 votes. Reform UK won 53 of the 84 seats, gaining overall control of the council from the Conservatives.

On 12 May 2025, Reform UK announced Atkinson as their choice for council leader. He was formally elected leader at the annual council meeting on 22 May 2025.

As leader, Atkinson chairs the council's cabinet. He was appointed chair of the Lancashire Combined County Authority on 17 June 2025.

== Personal life ==
Atkinson is married with two sons. He describes himself as a devoted family man and enjoys walking, skiing, motorcycling and sailing in his spare time.
