= Lancashire County Council =

English local authority

Type
- Type: Non-metropolitan county
- Established: 1 April 1889, reformed 1 April 1974

Leadership
- Chair: Lee Hutchinson, Reform UK since 21 May 2026
- Leader: Stephen Atkinson, Reform UK since 22 May 2025
- Chief Executive: Mark Wynn since 1 August 2024

Structure
- Seats: 84 councillors
- Graph of the party split among 84 seats.
- Political groups: Administration (51) Reform (51) Other parties (33) Conservative (9) Labour (6) Liberal Democrats (5) Green (3) OWL (2) Independent (8)
- Joint committees: Lancashire Combined County Authority
- Length of term: 4 years

Elections
- Voting system: First-past-the-post voting
- Last election: 1 May 2025
- Next election: 2029

Meeting place
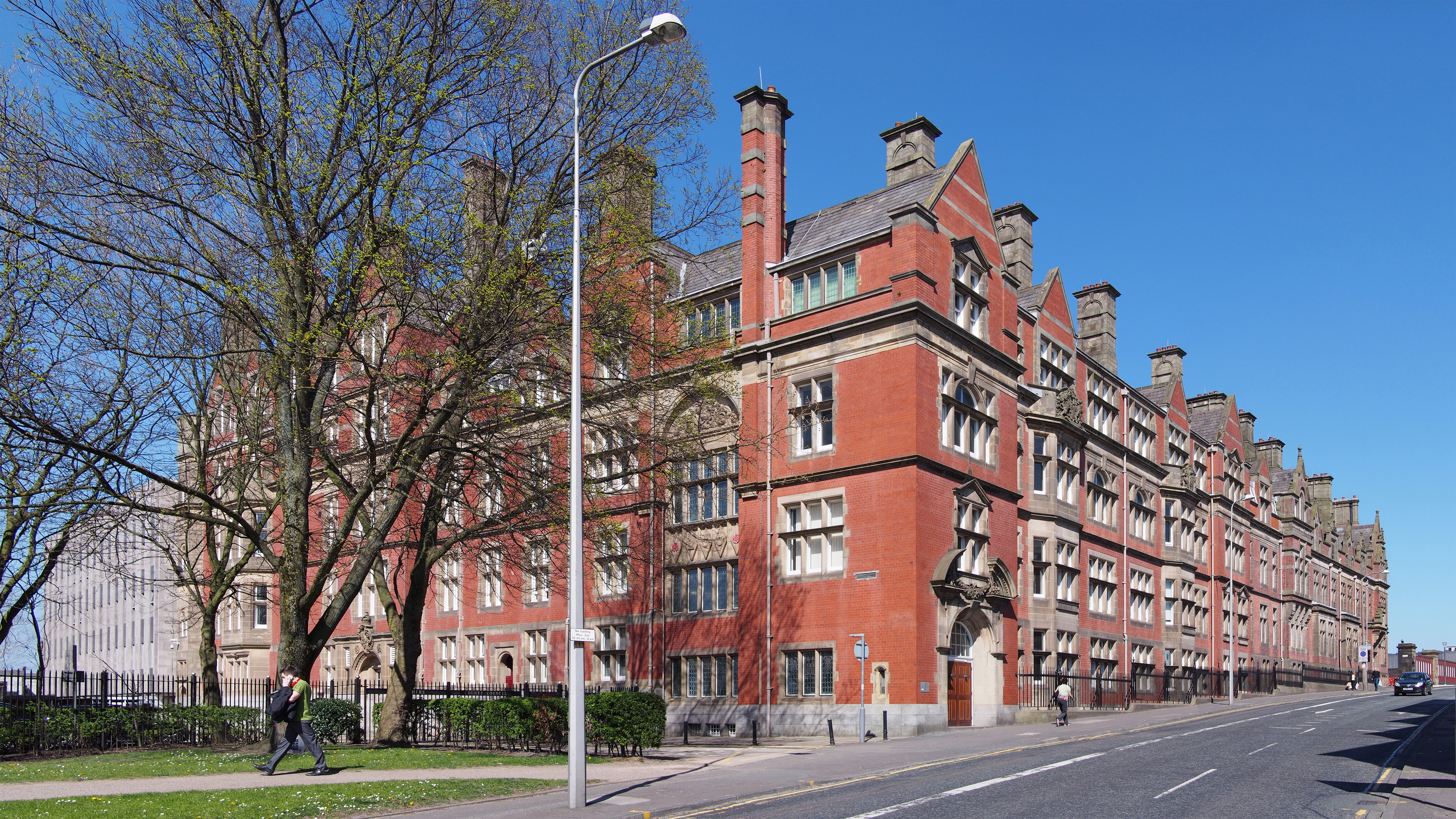
- County Hall, Fishergate, Preston, PR1 8XJ

Website
- www.lancashire.gov.uk

Lancashire County Council is the upper-tier local authority for the non-metropolitan county of Lancashire, England. The non-metropolitan county of Lancashire is smaller than the ceremonial county, which additionally includes Blackburn with Darwen and Blackpool. The council is based in County Hall, Preston, and consists of 84 councillors. It is a member of the Lancashire Combined County Authority.

Since the 2025 local elections the council has been under the majority control of Reform UK; this is the first time since the creation of the current council in 1974 that the Conservative Party or Labour Party has not been the largest party. The leader of the council, Stephen Atkinson, chairs a cabinet of eight councillors. The Chief Executive and Director of Resources is Mark Wynn.

The council is the successor to the county council of the administrative county of Lancashire, which was created on 1 April 1889. The council was abolished and reconstituted in 1974, when local government in England was reformed and a non-metropolitan county of Lancashire was created, governed by a county council and fourteen district councils. The districts of Blackpool and Blackburn with Darwen became unitary authorities in 1998, meaning they are no longer governed by Lancashire County Council.

== History ==
Elected county councils were created in 1889 under the Local Government Act 1888, taking over many administrative functions that had previously been performed by unelected magistrates at the quarter sessions. Fifteen boroughs were considered large enough for their existing councils to provide county-level services, and so they were made county boroughs, independent from the new county council. They were:

- Barrow-in-Furness
- Blackburn
- Bolton
- Bootle
- Burnley
- Bury
- Liverpool
- Manchester
- Oldham
- Preston
- Rochdale
- St Helens
- Salford
- Stockport (part) (Note: The county borough of Stockport straddled the geographic counties of Cheshire and Lancashire.)
- Wigan

The 1888 Act also placed each urban sanitary district which straddled county boundaries in one county, and so Lancashire gained the parts of Ashton under Lyne, Stalybridge, and Warrington which had been in Cheshire, and the parts of Mossley which had been in Cheshire and Yorkshire. Lancashire ceded its part of Todmorden to the West Riding of Yorkshire. Lancashire County Council was elected by and provided services to the parts of the county (as thus adjusted) outside the county boroughs. The county council's area was termed the administrative county.

Three more boroughs were later elevated to become county boroughs: Warrington in 1900, Blackpool in 1904, and Southport in 1905.

The first elections were held in January 1889 and the county council formally came into being on 1 April 1889. It held its first official meeting on 4 April 1889 at County Hall in Preston, the courthouse (completed 1882) which had served as the meeting place for the quarter sessions which preceded the county council. John Tomlinson Hibbert, a Liberal who had previously been the Member of Parliament for Oldham, was appointed the first chairman of the council.

In 1974, the Local Government Act 1972 abolished the administrative county of Lancashire and reconstituted the county as a non-metropolitan county. There were some significant changes to its territory, notably ceding significant areas in the south to Greater Manchester and Merseyside and in the north to Cumbria, whilst gaining more modest areas from Yorkshire to the east. Blackburn, Blackpool, Burnley and Preston were also brought into the non-metropolitan county, losing their former independence from the county council. The lower tier of local government was reorganised as part of the same reforms. Previously it had comprised numerous boroughs, urban districts and rural districts; they were reorganised into 14 non-metropolitan districts.

In 1998 two of the districts, Blackburn with Darwen and Blackpool, were both made unitary authorities, making them independent from the county council, leaving 12 districts within the non-metropolitan county.

In 2025, the council became a member of the new Lancashire Combined County Authority.

== Governance ==
=== Non-unitary authorities ===
Lancashire County Council provides county-level services. District-level services are provided by the county's twelve district councils. They are:

- Burnley Borough Council
- Chorley Council
- Fylde Council
- Hyndburn Borough Council
- Lancaster City Council
- Pendle Borough Council
- Preston City Council
- Ribble Valley Borough Council
- Rossendale Borough Council
- South Ribble Borough Council
- West Lancashire Borough Council
- Wyre Council

==== Unitary authorities ====
Two unitary authorities, which are functionally independent from Lancashire County Council, provide their own county-level services. They are:

- Blackburn with Darwen Borough Council
- Blackpool Council

=== Civil parishes ===
Much of the county is also covered by civil parishes, which form a third tier of local government.

=== Political control ===
The county council has been under Reform UK majority control since the May 2025 election.

Political control of the council since the 1974 reforms has been as follows:

Party in control	Years
Conservative	1974–1981
Labour	1981–1985
No overall control	1985–1989
Labour	1989–2009
Conservative	2009–2013
No overall control	2013–2017
Conservative	2017–2025
Reform	2025-present

=== Leadership ===
The leaders of the council since 1974 have been:

Councillor	Party	From	To
Leonard Broughton	Conservative	1 Apr 1974	May 1981
Louise Ellman	Labour	May 1981	Feb 1997
John West	Labour	Feb 1997	Jun 2001
Hazel Harding	Labour	Jun 2001	Jun 2009
Geoff Driver	Conservative	25 Jun 2009	May 2013
Jennifer Mein	Labour	23 May 2013	May 2017
Geoff Driver	Conservative	25 May 2017	May 2021
Phillippa Williamson	Conservative	27 May 2021	May 2025
Stephen Atkinson	Reform	22 May 2025	

=== Composition ===
Following the 2025 election, and subsequent changes of allegiance up to September 2026, the composition of the council was:

Party	Seats
Reform	51
Conservative	9
Labour	6
Liberal Democrats	5
Green	3
Our West Lancashire	2
Independent	8
Total	84

The eight independent councillors and the Green Party sit together as the "Progressive Lancashire" group. The next election is due in 2029.

=== Elections ===
Since the last boundary changes in 2017 the council has comprised 84 councillors representing 82 electoral divisions. Most divisions elect one councillor, but two divisions elect two councillors each. Elections are held every four years.

There are sixteen parliamentary constituencies in Lancashire. The Labour Party holds 13, the Conservative Party holds one, independent MP Adnan Hussain represents Blackburn, and the Speaker of the House of Commons, Sir Lindsay Hoyle, represents Chorley.

=== Premises ===
The council is based at County Hall on Fishergate in Preston. The original part of the building was a courthouse completed in 1882, which also served as the meeting place for the quarter sessions which preceded the county council. The building became the meeting place for the county council on its creation in 1889 and was significantly extended in 1903 and 1934 to provide additional office space.

== County Library ==
Lancashire adopted the Public Libraries Act, 1919, in 1924. Library services were slow to develop as the average ratable value of the area outside the county boroughs and the other local authorities which had already adopted the act was relatively low. In 1938/39 the average expenditure on urban libraries per head was 1s. 9d., but that on county libraries was only 8 1/4d. (about two fifths of the former amount). Another disadvantage was that government of libraries was by a libraries sub-committee of the education committee of the council (the librarian having to report to the education officer who might not have been sympathetic to libraries). The central administration of the county library is at Preston where there are special services, special collections and staff to maintain a union catalogue.

== Biological heritage sites ==
"Biological heritage sites" are, according to Lancashire County Council, "'local wildlife sites' in Lancashire...(that) are identified using a set of published guidelines." The published guidelines dictate the necessary parameters in which a piece of land can be properly considered a "biological heritage site" by the "(Lancashire) County Council, Wildlife Trust for Lancashire, Manchester and North Merseyside and Natural England."

== Coat of arms ==
Coat of arms of Lancashire County Council
Granted August 31, 1903 (arms); October 26, 1903 (supporters) Crest On a Wreath of the Colours a Lion passant guardant proper charged on the body with a Mascle Gules and resting the dexter forepaw on an Escocheon of the above said Arms. Escutcheon Gules three Piles two issuant from the chief and one in base Or each charged with a Rose of the field barbed and seeded proper. Supporters On either side a Lion proper gorged with a Collar Vair pendent therefrom an Escucheon of the Arms viz. Gules three Piles two issuant from the chief and one in base Or each charged with a Rose Gules barbed and seeded proper. Motto Latin: In consilio consilium, lit. 'In council is wisdom' Banner the heraldic banner of the council

== Notable members ==
- Richard Kay-Shuttleworth, 2nd Baron Shuttleworth (1937–1940), a fighter pilot killed in the Battle of Britain
