= Lancashire Combined County Authority =

Strategic authority and combined county authority in England

- Logo

- Area covered by the Lancashire Combined County Authority

Type
- Type: Combined county authority of Lancashire

Leadership
- Chair: Stephen Atkinson, Reform UK since 17 June 2025

Elections
- Voting system: Indirect election

Meeting place
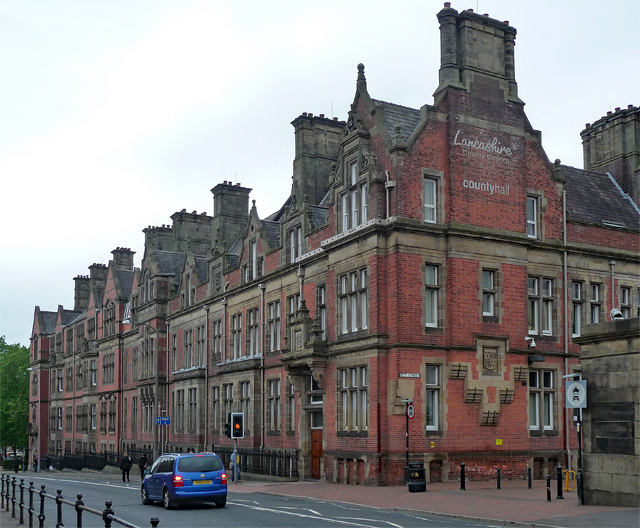
- County Hall, Preston

Website
- https://lancashire-cca.gov.uk/

The Lancashire Combined County Authority (LCCA) is a non-mayoral combined county authority comprising the three upper tier councils in Lancashire, namely Blackpool Council, Blackburn with Darwen Borough Council, and Lancashire County Council.

== History ==
A devolution deal was signed in November 2023 but did not come into effect until the public consultation was concluded. The deal proposes to devolve certain powers, i.e. housing, transport, education and skills as well as environmental matters to LCCA. The deal leaves room for Lancashire to progress to level 2 or 3 devolutions which on top of increasing the depth and breadth of the powers devolved, would also create the position of an elected mayor. However at the signing ceremony the leader of Lancashire county council stated that Lancashire was not a good fit for a mayor due to its rural nature. Proposals for a non-mayoral combined county authority for Lancashire were approved by the new Labour Government on 19 September 2024. Draft statutory instruments to establish the combined authority were laid before parliament on 26 November 2024 and the first meeting of the shadow authority took place at Preston County Hall the following day. The authority was formally launched on 5 February 2025.

In March 2025, Angela Rayner confirmed that Lancashire Combined Authority would get a mayor "within 18 months" to replace the previously agreed chair, in line with other combined authorities. This would be alongside the current process of local government reorganisation. In March 2025, Lancashire County Council leader Phillippa Williamson was chosen as chair. However, in May 2025 Williamson lost her council seat. At the subsequent annual meeting of the combined authority on 17 June 2025, Stephen Atkinson, the newly-appointed Reform UK leader of Lancashire County Council, was also appointed chair of the combined authority.

== Structure ==
The authority consists of four constituent members, one each from Blackpool and Blackburn with Darwen councils and two from Lancashire County Council, two non-constituent members nominated by the twelve lower tier district councils beneath Lancashire County Council, and two associate non-constituent members appointed by the CCA itself. There are no direct elections to the authority.

The existing constituent members will be abolished in 2028 and replaced by a different four covering the ceremonial county: Fylde Coast, North Lancashire, Pennine Lancashire, and South Lancashire.

As at June 2025, the authority's members were:

Name	Membership	Nominating authority
Stephen Atkinson	Constituent	Lancashire County Council
Phil Riley	Constituent	Blackburn with Darwen Borough Council
Lynn Williams	Constituent	Blackpool Council
Simon Evans	Constituent	Lancashire County Council
Alistair Bradley	Non-constituent	District councils of Lancashire
Michael Vincent	Non-constituent	District councils of Lancashire
Mo Isap	Associate	Lancashire Business Board
Clive Grunshaw	Observer	Lancashire Police and Crime Commissioner
