= William Thornber =

English minister

The Reverend William Thornber
- Born: 5 December 1803; Poulton-le-Fylde, Lancashire, England
- Died: 7 December 1885 (aged 82)
- Resting place: St John the Evangelist Churchyard, Blackpool, Lancashire, England
- Occupation: Minister

William Thornber (5 December 1803 – 7 December 1885) was an Anglican minister and historian. He was the first historian of Blackpool, his hometown.

== Early life ==
Thornber was born in Poulton-le-Fylde, Lancashire, in December 1803 to Giles Thornber and Elizabeth Harrison. His parents had married in February of that year. He was their first-born, followed by Richard, Mary, John and Paul.

He was trained at Trinity College in Oxford, England.

== Career ==
Thornber was minister of Blackpool's Parish Church of St John between 1829 and 1846. He had been appointed Stipendiary Curate in July 1828 and was ordained in December. He was appointed Perpetual Curate on 3 January 1829.

In 1837, he published The History of Blackpool and its Neighbourhood. It was printed and published in Poulton's Market Place.

== Personal life ==
In 1831, Thornber married Alice Banks, daughter of Blackpool developer Henry Banks. They had two children: Margaret and Giles.

== Death ==
Thornber died in 1885, two days after his 82nd birthday, while at Coton Hill, Staffordshire. He had been a widower for 17 years, following Alice's death in 1868. They were interred in a vault at the eastern end of St John's Church, beside William Cocker.
