= John Bickerstaffe =

British mayor

- Born: 20 January 1848; Blackpool, Lancashire, England
- Died: 5 August 1930 (aged 82); Blackpool, Lancashire, England
- Burial place: Layton Cemetery, Layton, Blackpool
- Notable work: Involvement in the building of Blackpool Tower
- Spouse: Lucy Gerrard (m. 1876)

Sir John Bickerstaffe (20 January 1848 – 5 August 1930) was a philanthropist and a pivotal figure in the growth of Blackpool, a seaside resort in Lancashire, England. He also served as the town's mayor and was a justice of the peace.

== Early life ==
Bickerstaffe was born in 1848 in a cottage in Caunce Square, Blackpool, to Robert Bickerstaffe and Elizabeth Platt. His brother, Tom, 12 years his senior, became an alderman and justice of the peace. John became a close friend of William Cocker, who went on to become another important figure in Blackpool's development.

Bickerstaffe was educated in the Blackpool National Schools and then at a private school in the town.

== Career ==
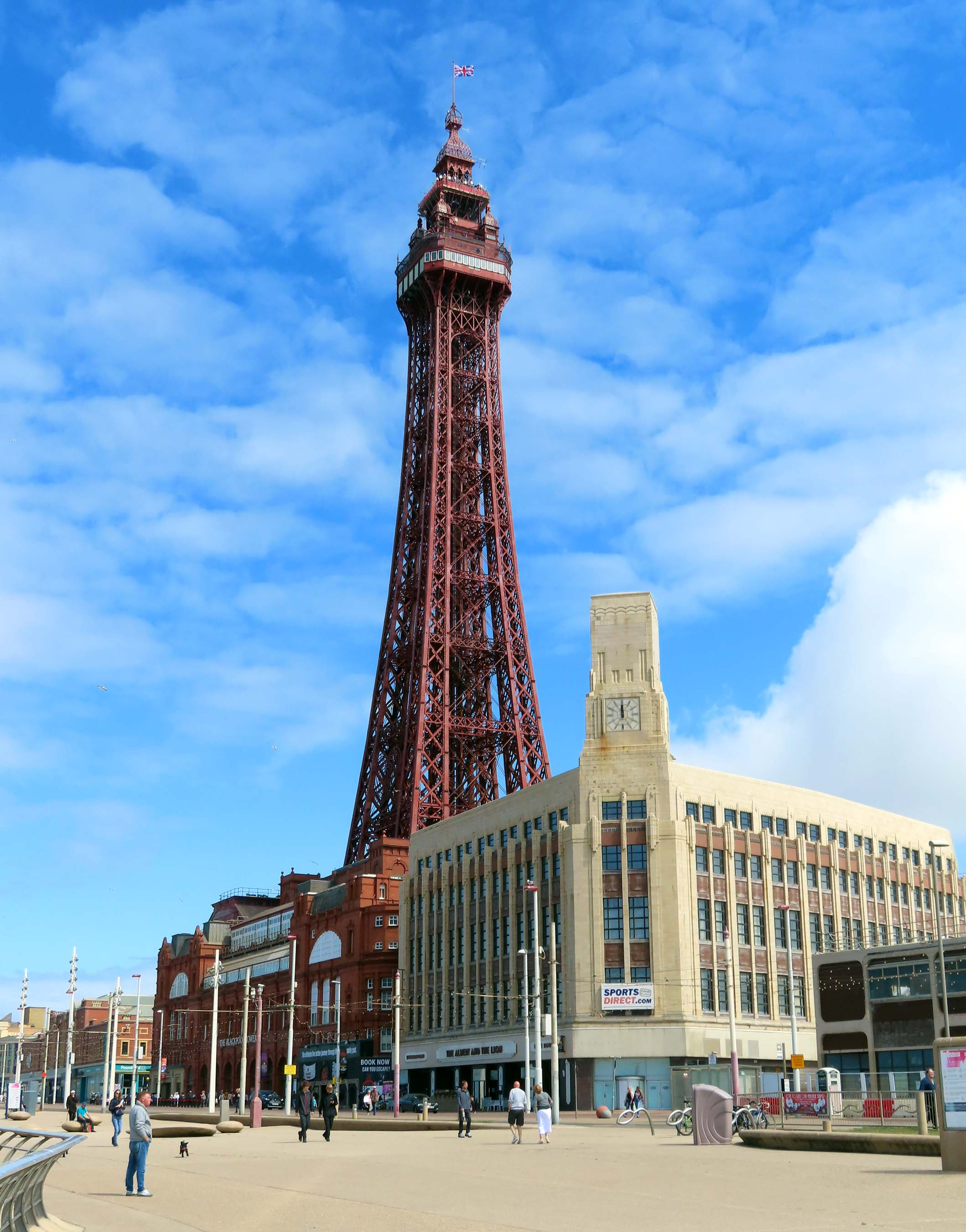
Blackpool Tower

Bickerstaffe's career began as a boatman and as a member of Blackpool's first lifeboat crew. The lifeboat, the Robert Williams, was coxswained by his cousin, Robert Bickerstaffe.

He later became a licensee of the Wellington Hotel, located near Central Pier on Blackpool Promenade, before his father's death. In civic duties, Bickerstaffe served over fifty years on Blackpool's council. He was mayor for two consecutive terms, from 1888 to 1890 and 1890 and 1891. He was also a justice of the peace.

In 1887, he became a founder and president of Blackpool F.C. after it broke away from St John's F.C.

Bickerstaffe was involved in the construction of Blackpool's Palace Theatre and Blackpool Tower, having been inspired to build the latter after visiting the Eiffel Tower in 1889. Blackpool Tower was completed five years later. It was for these that he was known as "Mr Blackpool".

== Personal life ==
On 20 January, 1876, Bickerstaffe's 28th birthday, he married Eliza Gerrard in Glasson Dock. They had one son―Robert Gerrard Bickerstaffe―in 1876, as well as seven daughters: Elizabeth, Edith, Maude, Florence, Daisy, Violet and Beatrice.

Bickerstaffe was knighted in the King's Birthday Honours in 1926.

== Death ==
Bickerstaffe died in 1930, aged 82. He was at his home in Hornby Road, Blackpool. He was interred in Layton Cemetery, Layton.

A portrait of Bickerstaffe, by Charles Auty, hangs in Blackpool Town Hall.

=== Legacy ===
The square in Blackpool's Talbot Gateway was named Bickerstaffe Square in his honour.
