= Streetlife (charity) =

Homelessness charity in North West England

- Founded: 1995; 31 years ago
- Type: Not-for-profit organisation
- Purpose: Homeless community
- Location: Blackpool, United Kingdom
- Region served: North West England
- Services: Night shelter for homeless people, a youth centre for young people aged 16–25, wellbeing services
- Chief executive: Jane Hugo
- Staff: 11 (2014)
- Volunteers: 35 (2014)
- Website: wearestreetlife.org

Streetlife is a British registered charity based in Blackpool, United Kingdom, that supports young homeless people. The charity was founded in 1984 and their shelter opened in 1992.

Their aim is to provide shelter and support to young homeless people across North West England aged 16–25. Around 400 young people access Streetlife's services each year.

Streetlife's CEO is Jane Hugo. There are also 6 full-time and 5 part-time staff members, in addition to 35 volunteers working for the charity. Volunteers come from countries such as Ghana, New Zealand, Spain and Germany to work for the charity. Streetlife receives support from The Amy Winehouse Foundation and Children In Need. In 2010, the charity was presented with the Queen's Award for Voluntary Service.

Due to austerity measures, in 2014 Streetlife received news that they would lose £100,000 in funding from Blackpool Council.

== Mission ==
The charity's mission is to support young homeless people in Blackpool. It operates a night shelter, which is open each night and located next to St Johns Church, Blackpool. During the day, Streetlife operates a 'Base' located on Buchanan Street. The Base offers support, advice, personal consultations on housing, finance, and help with finding gainful employment.

== Campaigns and projects ==
In 2013, Streetlife created the '£5 What can it buy?' campaign. The ongoing fundraiser highlights what £5 can buy for young homeless people. The campaign encourages individuals and businesses to set up a direct debit of £5 a month to Streetlife to help support the overall operations of the charity.

In 2014, Streetlife partnered with international media licensing company Amurco to launch 'StreetSound'. The project consisted of 8 weekly songwriting workshops to create a song with the young homeless people from Streetlife. The song was released as part of a campaign to boost external funding for the charity and receives donations though the JustGiving page.
