= South Lancashire =

South Lancashire may refer to:

- The southern part of Lancashire, England
- South Lancashire dialect - a form of the Lancashire dialect
- South Lancashire (unitary authority area), district to be created in 2028
- South Lancashire (UK Parliament constituency), a former constituency
- South Lancashire Regiment former unit of the British Army.
- Diamond Bus North West, which briefly operated as South Lancs Travel.
