= William Cocker =

British mayor

- Born: 9 December 1836
- Died: 14 April 1911 (aged 74)
- Spouse: Betsey Pilling (m. 1858)

William Henry Cocker (9 December 1836 – 14 April 1911) was the first mayor of Blackpool, Lancashire, England, serving, in his initial term, from 1876 to 1879. He served again from 1884 to 1885 and from 1886 to 1887. He was selected as the first Freeman of the Borough in 1897. Cocker was noted for taking Blackpool from a "small coastal village into a major tourist destination," and has been called a founding father of Victorian Blackpool.

== Early life ==
Cocker was born in 1836 to John Cocker and Jane Banks, daughter of Henry Banks, in a house his father had built in Hygiene Terrace on Blackpool Promenade. His father had moved to Blackpool from Tockholes, near Darwen in east Lancashire, in 1828. William was educated at Preston Grammar School.

Cocker became a close friend of John Bickerstaffe, who went on to become another important figure in Blackpool's development.

In 1858, he married Betsey Pilling, a native of Rochdale.

== Career ==
Cocker retired from his career as a surgeon in 1875. Two years earlier, he had opened a menagerie and aquarium in Blackpool's Prince of Wales Arcade, which later became the site of Blackpool Tower. The aquarium was incorporated into the tower building.

== Personal life ==
In 1878, Cocker laid the foundation stone of Blackpool's St John's Parish Church, and had donated £1,000 towards the cost of the church's construction.

== Death ==
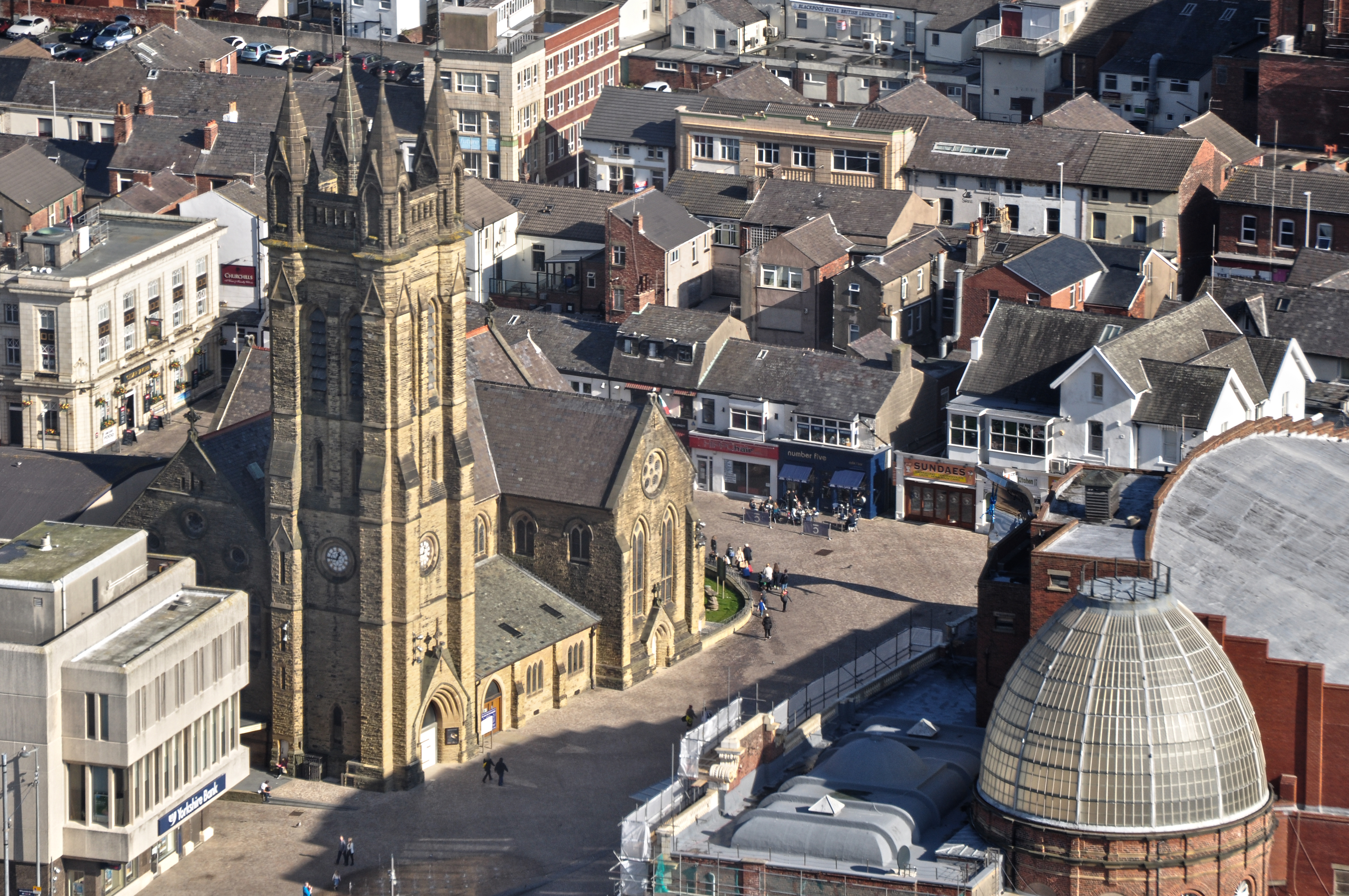
St John's Church, Blackpool, beside which Cocker is buried

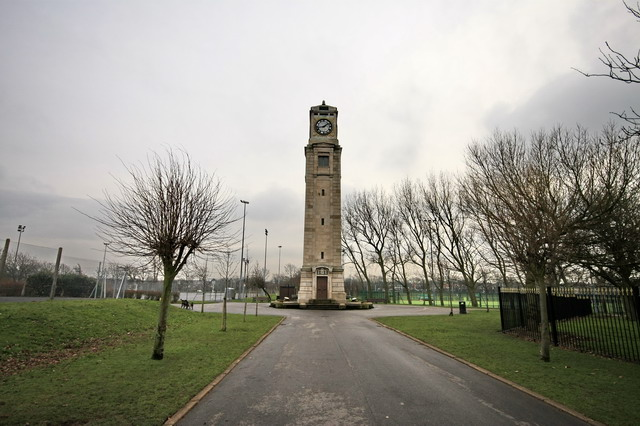
Cocker Clock Tower, Stanley Park, Blackpool

Cocker died in 1911, aged 74. Having survived his wife for three years, he was interred alongside her, his parents, brother and sister-in-law in a small grassy burial ground at the eastern end of St John's Parish Church. He was also buried beside the tomb of noted Blackpool historian Reverend William Thornber. Having died a poor man, living in relative poverty in a house on Whitegate Drive, there was no money to add an inscription to Cocker's gravestone.

=== Legacy ===
The clock tower in Blackpool's Stanley Park is named for Cocker. It was built in 1926 to honour his contributions to the town. John Bickerstaffe unveiled the clock.

Blackpool's Cocker Street is also named for him. A portrait of Cocker, by an unknown artist, hangs in Blackpool Town Hall.
