= Carl Walker =

English police inspector (1934–2022)

Carl Walker GC
- Born: 31 March 1934; Blackpool, Lancashire, England
- Died: 2 October 2022 (aged 88)
- Police career
- Department: Lancashire Constabulary
- Rank: Inspector
- Awards: George Cross

Carl Walker, GC (31 March 1934 – 2 October 2022) was an English police inspector who served in the Lancashire Constabulary until 1982 when he was forced to retire due to injuries sustained in a shooting in Blackpool, an incident after which he was awarded the George Cross.

On 23 August 1971, when Walker was a constable, he was one of several officers who pursued a gang of five armed robbers who had attacked a jeweller's shop in Blackpool. When the gang split up, Walker and his colleague and superintendent Gerry Richardson chased one of the raiders down a dead-end alleyway. 'Fat' Fred Sewell shot Walker in the groin then Richardson twice in the stomach. Richardson died of his injuries later that day, and was also later awarded the George Cross, posthumously.

The award citations were published in the London Gazette on 13 November 1972.

All five robbers were jailed, including Sewell who served thirty years for wounding Walker and for murdering Richardson; he was released in 2001 when aged 68. Sewell was reported to have amassed a wealth of around £1 million from property dealings while in prison.

Walker was discharged from the police force on medical grounds in 1982.

He married Kathleen Barker in 1955 whom he had one son with.

He died on 2 October 2022, at the age of 88.

== Honours ==

Ribbon	Description	Notes
	George Cross (GC)	13 November 1972
	Queen Elizabeth II Silver Jubilee Medal	1977; UK Version of this Medal; Qualified as a George Cross Recipient
	Queen Elizabeth II Diamond Jubilee Medal	2012; UK Version of this Medal; Qualified as a George Cross Recipient
	Queen Elizabeth II Platinum Jubilee Medal	2022; UK Version of this Medal; Qualified as a George Cross Recipient
	Police Long Service and Good Conduct Medal	
