= Henry Banks (developer) =

British developer

Henry Banks (1758 – 18 April 1847) was an English developer. He was known as the "Father of Blackpool," having been responsible for several buildings in the town.

== Early life ==
Banks was born in Blackpool in 1758 to Edward Banks and Jane Pearson. He was their first child, and was followed by Thomas and Catherine.

== Career ==
In 1819, he purchased the Lane Ends estate (including the Lane Ends Hotel), on which he built Blackpool's first holiday cottages. In 1837, his son-in-law, John Cocker, built the town's first assembly rooms. John Cocker was the father of Blackpool's first mayor, William Cocker. William inherited Banks's land and buildings.

== Personal life ==
Banks married Margaret Bailey, with whom had two known children: Alice (who married Reverend William Thornber) and Jane (who married John Cocker).
