= St John's Church, Blackpool =

Blackpool Church – St John's
- Church of Saint John the Evangelist
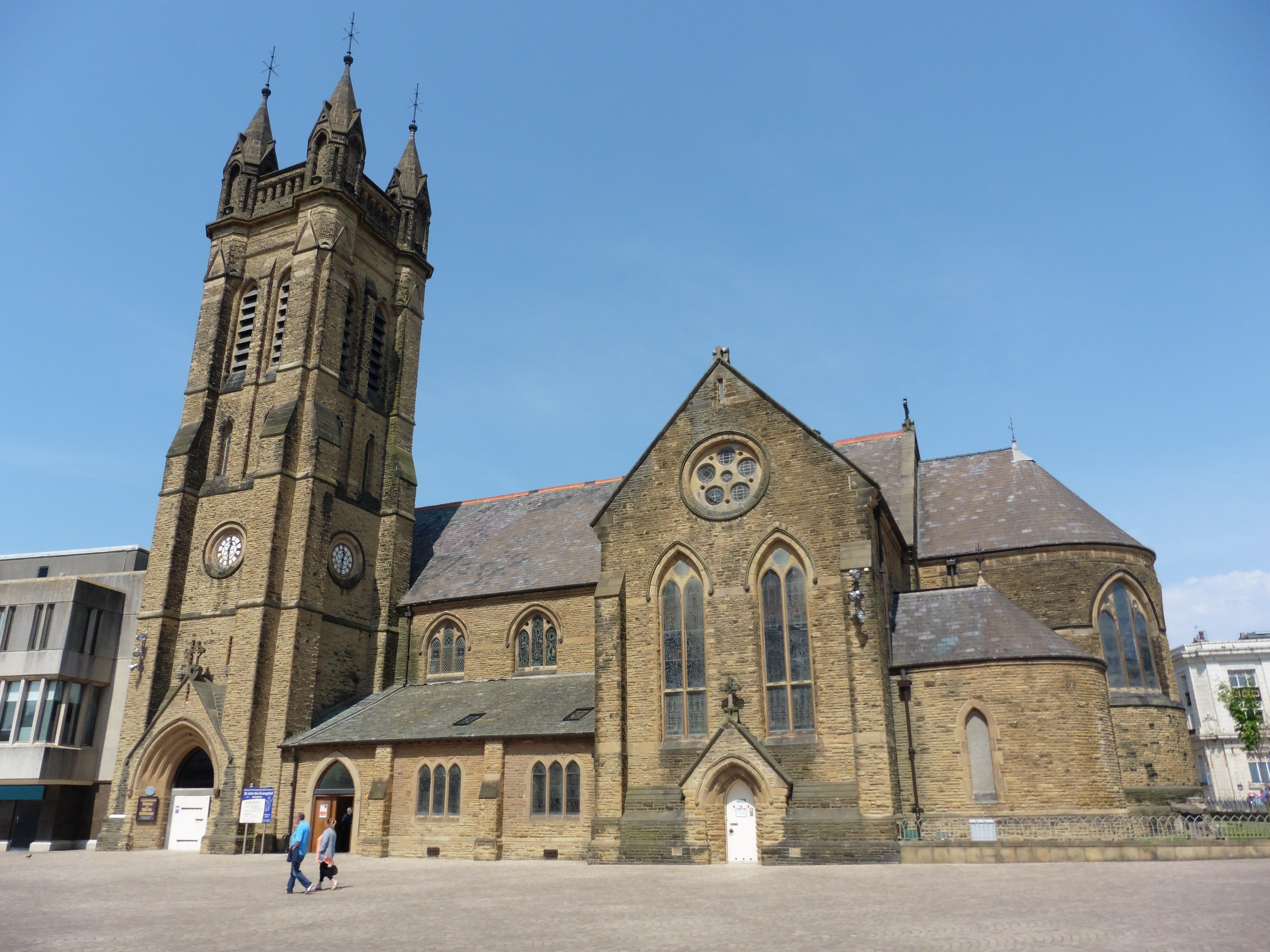
- St John's Church, from Church Street

- Location in Blackpool
- 53.8182°N 3.0509°W
- OS grid reference: SD 3091 3628
- Location: Blackpool, Lancashire
- Country: England
- Denomination: Anglican
- Churchmanship: Evangelical

History
- Status: Parish church
- Dedication: John the Evangelist
- Consecrated: 25 June 1878

Architecture
- Functional status: Active
- Heritage designation: Grade II
- Architect(s): Garlick, Park and Sykes
- Style: Early English

Specifications
- Materials: Stone with slate roofs

Administration
- Province: York
- Diocese: Blackburn
- Archdeaconry: Lancaster
- Deanery: Blackpool

The parish church of Blackpool Saint John the Evangelist, or St John's Blackpool, is an Anglican church in Blackpool, Lancashire, England. It was completed in 1878 and is a Grade II listed building. A church was built on the site in 1821 and was replaced by the current building to accommodate a larger congregation. The church was designed by Garlick, Park and Sykes in the Early English style and has been restored and renovated in 1986 and from 2000 to 2006. St John's is known as the parish church of Blackpool, and is an active parish church in the Diocese of Blackburn which is within the ecclesiastical province of York. It is in the Archdeaconry of Lancaster and the Deanery of Blackpool.

== History and architecture ==
Until the early 19th century, there was no parish church in Blackpool and All Hallows Church at nearby Bispham was used for Blackpool's baptisms, marriages and burials. A church was built on the present site of the St John's in 1821. It was dedicated to John the Evangelist and consecrated on 6 July 1821 by George Henry Law, the Bishop of Chester. The church was enlarged in 1832 and 1847; a chancel was added in 1851. St John's became a parish in 1860. In Porter's Guide to Blackpool, Fleetwood, Lytham, etc. of 1871, the church was described as "a plain brick edifice, with a low embattled tower, and destitute of any architectural beauty". The churchyard was closed to burials in 1873, when Layton Cemetery was completed, about 1.5 miles (2.4 km) away.

To cope with a growing congregation, it was decided to replace the church with a larger building. The smaller church of 1821 was demolished in 1877 and building of the new church commenced immediately. The foundation stone was laid by Blackpool's first mayor, Dr William Cocker, who had donated £1000 towards the cost of the construction. The building was completed in 1878. The new church was consecrated on 25 June 1878 by James Fraser, the Bishop of Manchester. The present church was built in 1878 to a design by Garlick, Park and Sykes. It is constructed in the Early English style from yellow stone, with slate roofs and ashlar interiors. The tower is at the south west of the building and has four stages and angled buttresses which are topped with pinnacles and finials. On each wall of the tower are two tall Belfry louvres. St John's has a nave with low aisles, tall transepts and an apsidal chancel. The nave has cylindrical columns with circular caps. The chancel has a Gothic style screen and wooden panelling.

St John's was designated a Grade II listed building on 20 October 1983. The Grade II listing—the lowest of the three grades—is for buildings that are "nationally important and of special interest". After 100 years of use, the church was in need of repair and restoration work was carried out in 1986. Further renovation took place between 2000 and 2006 at a cost of £1.6 million. A community and conference centre were built, as well as a dedicated area for the homelessness charity Streetlife. The inside of the church now features a modern, comfortable worship space with several other rooms created around it.

== Present day ==
Blackpool Church – St John's launched as an HTB resource church on 17 April 2022 after being added to the HTB Network.

There is a weekly Sunday gathering starting at 11am, with doors open at 10.30am for hot drinks and pastries. The Sunday gathering has worship, prayer and a talk from the Bible and there are groups for children and young people.

There is a public Communion service held at Beacon Church – in partnership with Blackpool Church – on Wednesdays at 11am.

An Alpha course is held three times per year, once per term and is an opportunity to explore questions about faith.

There is also a weekly toddler group at the church for children aged 0–4 on Wednesdays at 9:30am. There are stories, crafts and singing and refreshments for children and parents/carers.

== See also ==
- Listed buildings in Blackpool
