= Gerry Richardson =

Murdered British police officer

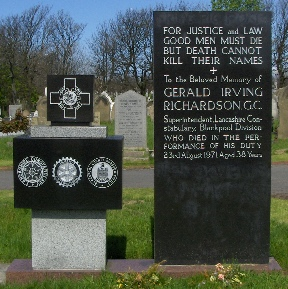
- Richardson's grave in Layton Cemetery, Blackpool
- Born: 2 November 1932; Norbreck, Blackpool, Lancashire, England
- Died: 23 August 1971 (aged 38); Victoria Hospital, Blackpool, Lancashire, England
- Other name: Gerry
- Police career
- Department: Lancashire Constabulary
- Rank: Superintendent
- Awards: George Cross

Superintendent Gerald Irving Richardson GC (2 November 1932 – 23 August 1971) was a British police officer in the Lancashire Constabulary and is one of the highest-ranking officers to be murdered in the line of duty in Great Britain. In 1972 he was posthumously awarded the George Cross.

== Early years ==
Gerry Richardson was born in Blackpool, Lancashire, in 1932 to Irving Richardson and Lilian Pugh and had always aspired to join the police force.

== Murder ==
On 23 August 1971, Richardson assisted in a car chase of a gang of five armed robbers who had attacked a jeweller's shop in Blackpool. As the gang split up and attempted to escape on foot, he and PC Carl Walker, who also later won the George Cross, chased one of the raiders, Frederick Joseph Sewell (known as "Fat" Fred), down a dead-end alleyway. Sewell shot Walker in the thigh before Richardson tackled the gunman and attempted to persuade him to surrender his weapon. However, Richardson was shot twice in the stomach at point-blank range and died of his injuries later that day at Blackpool's Victoria Hospital.

== Funeral ==
His funeral was attended by around 100,000 members of the public; Richardson was buried in Layton Cemetery.

== Conviction of murderers ==
The five armed robbers were all convicted and sentenced to a combined total of 93 years in prison, including Sewell who escaped after the shooting but was tracked down to a north London flat and jailed for 30 years for murder. Sewell said of Richardson at his trial: "I shall see him every day of my life. He just kept coming. He was too brave." Sewell was released in 2001, when aged 68, after completing his sentence and reportedly having amassed a wealth of around £1 million through property deals made in prison.

== Honours and trusts ==
A plaque in the Memorial Room at Collegiate High School where Richardson was educated

His posthumous award of the George Cross was cited in the London Gazette of 13 November 1972. The Superintendent Gerald Richardson Memorial Youth Trust was created in 1974 in his honour and helps people under the age of 25, particularly those physically or mentally disabled, who live in Blackpool.

== See also ==
- List of British police officers killed in the line of duty
