= 2023 Blackpool Council election =

2023 local election in Blackpool

- 4 May 2023

All 42 seats to Blackpool Council 22 seats needed for a majority
- Turnout: 27.05%
	First party	Second party	Third party
Leader	Lynn Williams	Don Clapham (Note: Interim Leader)
Party	Labour	Conservative	Independents
Leader's seat	Claremont Ward	Bispham Ward
Last election	23 seats, 43.9%	15 seats, 44.4%	4 seats, 6.9%
Seats before	20	13	9 (Note: Of the nine independent councillors prior to the election, three formed the "Blackpool Independents" group led by Gary Coleman, and the remaining six independents were not aligned to any group)
Seats won	28	14	0
Seat change	▲8	▲1	▼9
Popular vote	25,380	22,263	2,880
Percentage	48.3%	42.4%	5.5%
Swing	▲4.4%	▼2.0%	▼1.4%
- Winner of each seat at the 2023 Blackpool Council election
Leader before election
Lynn Williams
Labour
No overall control
Leader after election
Lynn Williams
Labour

The 2023 Blackpool Council election was held on 4 May 2023 to elect members of Blackpool Council in Lancashire, England. All 42 councillors were up for election. This was at the same time as other local elections across England.

Prior to the election the council was under no overall control, being led by a Labour minority administration. Labour won a majority of the seats on the council at this election.

== Background ==
Elections were held for Blackpool Council on 4 May 2023 along with councils across England as part of the 2023 local elections. The members were elected in all-out elections, with all 42 councillors up for election across 21 wards every four years.

At the previous election in 2019, 23 Labour councillors and 15 Conservative councillors were elected, alongside 4 independent councillors. Due to a number of changes of allegiance, Labour lost its majority in April 2021. The council then remained under no overall control until the 2023 election with Labour running a minority administration.

In June 2020 former Council Leader Simon Blackburn was suspended by the Labour Party after allegations of inappropriate behaviour. The investigation was dropped a year later after he left the party. Lynn Williams, as Deputy Leader at the time, subsequently became the first female Leader of Blackpool Council. Councillor Blackburn remained an independent Councillor for Brunswick Ward but confirmed he was not seeking re-election in 2023.

In May 2021 Martin Mitchell, Labour Councillor, was removed from his position as Chairman of the Tourism, Economy and Communities Scrutiny Committee after refusing to back the party's proposals to redevelop Stanley Park Golf Course.

6 May 2021 also saw two by-elections following the deaths of two members, Lily Henderson and former Council Leader Peter Callow. Highfield Ward saw the election of Conservative Bradley Mitchell, while in Norbreck Ward Conservative Julie Sloman was also elected.

In April 2022 Martin Mitchell resigned from the Labour Party and remained an independent Councillor for Layton Ward as part of the 'Blackpool Independents' group alongside Debbie and Gary Coleman. He stood for re-election in 2023 as an independent candidate but was defeated.

Following the death of Conservative Councillor John Wing in August 2022, a by-election was held in Greenlands Ward in November which saw the election of Peter Wright for the Labour Party. Wright won the election by a small margin of 32 votes, against the Conservative candidate Jane Warne.

In November 2022 Councillor Derek Robertson was deselected by the Blackpool South Conservative Association as a candidate for the local elections. He had been councillor for Waterloo Ward since 2014 and resigned from the Conservative Party. He served the remainder of his term as an independent. He stood for re-election as a candidate for Reform UK, but was defeated.

In February 2023 Councillor Tony Williams, along with other Tory councillors, signed a letter of no confidence in the Blackpool South MP Scott Benton and was then suspended from the Conservative Party. He subsequently resigned as Leader of the Council's Conservative Group. He served the remainder of his term as an independent councillor. He stood for re-election as an independent in Norbreck Ward but was defeated.

Notice of candidates nominated was given on 5 April.

Labour and the Conservatives fielded 42 candidates across all wards. There were a total of 10 independent candidates, the highest in recent decades, followed by Reform UK with 5 candidates, the Green Party also with 5 candidates and lastly the Liberal Democrats with 4 candidates, their lowest number of candidates in Blackpool in recent times.

== Incumbents not seeking re-election ==
Conservative

- Christian Cox - Squires Gate
- Don Clapham - Bispham (Retiring)

Labour

- David Collect - Tyldesley Ward
- Amy Cross - Ingthorpe Ward
- Adrian Hutton - Clifton Ward
- Maria Kirkland - Park Ward
- Allan Matthews - Tyldesley Ward
- Peter Wright - Greenlands Ward
- David O'Hara - Standing in Norbreck Ward, formerly Waterloo Cllr

Non-Aligned Independent

- Simon Blackburn - Brunswick Ward (Not seeking re-election)
- David Owen - Victoria Ward
- Tony Williams - Standing in Norbreck Ward, formerly Anchorsholme Cllr

Blackpool Independents

- Debbie Coleman - Marton Ward (Not seeking re-election)
- Gary Coleman - Brunswick Ward (Not seeking re-election)

== Summary ==
=== Election result ===
Blackpool Council after the 2023 local elections

The results of the election were announced on 5 May. Net gains and losses are presented against the most recent standings prior to this election.

2023 Blackpool Council election
Party	Candidates	Seats	Gains	Losses	Net gain/loss	Seats %	Votes %	Votes	+/−
Labour	42	28	8	0	▲8	66.7	48.3	25,380	+4.4
Conservative	42	14	1	0	▲1	33.3	42.4	22,263	-2.0
Independent	10	0	0	9	▼9	0.0	5.5	2,880	-1.4
Green	5	0	0	0	0	0.0	1.5	796	-1.1
Reform	5	0	0	0	0	0.0	1.2	647	N/A
Liberal Democrats	4	0	0	0	0	0.0	1.1	601	-1.0

=== Council composition ===
After the previous election, the composition of the council was:

↓
23	4	15
Labour	Independent	Conservative

Immediately ahead of this election, the composition of the council was:

↓
20	9	13
Labour	Independent	Conservative

Following this election, the composition of the council was:

↓
28	14
Labour	Conservative

The next election is due in 2027.

== Ward results ==
Incumbent councillors seeking re-election are marked with an asterisk (*).

=== Anchorsholme ===
Anchorsholme (2 Seats)
Party	Candidate	Votes	%	±%
Conservative	Paul Galley*	1,106	65.3	−0.6
Conservative	Anita Cooper	963	56.9	−6.3
Labour	Jacqueline Boughton	584	34.5	+7.2
Labour	Therese Clark	568	33.5	+14.1
Majority				
Turnout		1,704	33.99	
Rejected ballots		11	0.6	
Conservative hold		Swing		
Conservative hold		Swing		

=== Bispham ===
Bispham (2 Seats)
Party	Candidate	Votes	%	±%
Conservative	Paul Wilshaw*	671	50.6	+5.2
Conservative	Tony Warne	666	50.2	−0.4
Labour	Jim Elmes	621	46.8	+16.6
Labour	Julia Walshaw	616	46.4	+17.7
Majority				
Turnout		1,349	30.93	
Rejected ballots		22	1.6	
Conservative hold		Swing		
Conservative hold		Swing		

=== Bloomfield ===
Bloomfield (2 seats)
Party	Candidate	Votes	%	±%
Labour	Mel Fenlon	374	45.2	−20.5
Labour	Jim Hobson*	371	44.8	−16.6
Independent	Mark Butcher	261	31.5	N/A
Independent	Graham Cain*	237	28.6	−37.1
Conservative	Cody Milnes	195	23.6	−6.0
Conservative	Malaya Nayak	129	15.6	−10.5
Majority				
Turnout		829	18.21	
Rejected ballots		1	0.1	
Labour hold		Swing		
Labour hold		Swing		

=== Brunswick ===
Brunswick (2 seats)
Party	Candidate	Votes	%	±%
Labour	Matthew Charles Thomas	761	67.2	+28.4
Labour	Laura Marshall	717	63.3	+27.4
Conservative	Paul Clark	368	32.5	+14.9
Conservative	John Thomson	343	30.3	+14.0
Majority				
Turnout		1,146	23.41	
Rejected ballots		14	1.2	
Labour hold		Swing		
Labour gain from Independent		Swing		

=== Claremont ===
Claremont (2 seats)
Party	Candidate	Votes	%	±%
Labour	Ivan Taylor*	538	58.7	+0.5
Labour	Lynn Williams*	504	55.0	+1.0
Conservative	Harry Gordon	222	24.2	+0.1
Conservative	Lawrence Sloman	179	19.5	−0.3
Independent	Garry Richardson	144	15.7	−0.8
Liberal Democrats	Sue Close	124	13.5	−0.1
Majority				
Turnout		922	19.19	
Rejected ballots		5	0.5	
Labour hold		Swing		
Labour hold		Swing		

=== Clifton ===
Clifton (2 seats)
Party	Candidate	Votes	%	±%
Labour	Paula Burdess*	713	61.6	+8.6
Labour	Alistair Humphreys	694	59.9	+7.8
Conservative	Robert Wilson	424	36.6	−2.6
Conservative	Oliver Potts	346	29.9	−8.4
Majority				
Turnout		1,175	24.09	
Rejected ballots		17	1.4	
Labour hold		Swing		
Labour hold		Swing		

=== Greenlands ===
Greenlands (2 seats)
Party	Candidate	Votes	%	±%
Labour	Julie Jones	785	46.6	+0.6
Labour	Dave Flanagan	771	45.7	+1.4
Conservative	Jane Warne	701	41.6	−5.5
Conservative	Rick Scott*	680	40.3	−9.3
Green	Benjamin Thomas	167	9.9	N/A
Reform	Lance Fogg	107	6.3	N/A
Majority				
Turnout		1,689	31.66	
Labour gain from Conservative		Swing		
Labour gain from Conservative		Swing		

|- ! scope=row colspan="3" style="text-align: right; margin-right: 0.5em" | Rejected ballots | style="text-align: right; margin-right: 0.5em" | 3 | style="text-align: right; margin-right: 0.5em" | 0.2 | style="text-align: right; margin-right: 0.5em" | |-

=== Hawes Side ===
Hawes Side (2 seats)
Party	Candidate	Votes	%	±%
Labour	Kim Critchley*	672	55.7	+10.5
Labour	Neal Brookes*	657	54.5	+9.4
Conservative	Karen Higgitt	485	40.2	+3.2
Conservative	Frank Downing	478	39.6	+4.7
Majority				
Turnout		1,216	23.89	
Rejected ballots		10	0.8	
Labour hold		Swing		
Labour hold		Swing		

=== Highfield ===
Highfield (2 seats)
Party	Candidate	Votes	%	±%
Labour	Peter Hunter*	880	49.2	−1.1
Conservative	Bradley Mitchell*	831	46.5	−1.7
Conservative	Jack Robinson	763	42.6	−2.6
Labour	Sharon Hoyle	734	41.0	+1.2
Liberal Democrats	Bill Greene	172	9.6	N/A
Majority				
Turnout		1,801	33.69	
Rejected ballots		12	0.7	
Labour hold		Swing		
Conservative hold		Swing		

=== Ingthorpe ===
Ingthorpe (2 seats)
Party	Candidate	Votes	%	±%
Labour	Jon Bamborough	743	55.7	+1.6
Labour	Jo Farrell*	697	52.2	+2.5
Conservative	Alexander Higgs	575	43.1	+0.2
Conservative	James Murphy	538	40.3	+1.4
Majority				
Turnout		1,339	26.60	
Rejected ballots		5	0.4	
Labour hold		Swing		
Labour hold		Swing		

=== Layton ===
Layton (2 seats)
Party	Candidate	Votes	%	±%
Labour	Kath Benson*	733	50.9	−2.6
Labour	John Boughton	678	47.1	+1.4
Conservative	Chris Bates	381	26.5	−6.9
Independent	Martin Mitchell*	378	26.3	−19.8
Conservative	Roy Haskett	352	24.5	−9.3
Independent	Lee Taylor-Jack	187	13.0	+0.9
Majority				
Turnout		1,442	28.72	
Rejected ballots		3	0.2	
Labour hold		Swing		
Labour hold		Swing		

=== Marton ===
Marton (2 seats)
Party	Candidate	Votes	%	±%
Labour	Sarah Smith	814	51.7	+16.5
Labour	Shaun Brookes	799	50.7	+17.7
Conservative	Andrew Stansfield*	630	40.0	+2.0
Conservative	Glenn Priestley	595	37.8	+6.9
Reform	Kerry Anderson-Riley	150	9.5	N/A
Majority				
Turnout		1580	31.31	
Rejected ballots		5	0.3	
Labour gain from Conservative		Swing		
Labour gain from Independent		Swing		

=== Norbreck ===
Norbreck (2 seats)
Party	Candidate	Votes	%	±%
Conservative	Emma Ellison	714	41.7	+9.2
Conservative	Julie Sloman*	652	38.1	+7.2
Independent	Maxine Callow*	562	32.8	−6.4
Independent	Tony Williams	501	29.2	−8.7
Labour	Robert Harrison	440	25.7	+5.7
Labour	David O'Hara	418	24.4	+5.9
Majority				
Turnout		1,714	34.29	
Rejected ballots		1	0.1	
Conservative gain from Independent		Swing		
Conservative gain from Independent		Swing		

=== Park ===
Park (2 seats)
Party	Candidate	Votes	%	±%
Labour	Gillian Campbell*	616	61.5	+5.8
Labour	Adrian Hoyle	551	55.0	+2.6
Conservative	Frazer Rogers	365	36.4	+2.6
Conservative	Paul Carter	358	35.7	−3.6
Majority				
Turnout		1,016	20.81	
Rejected ballots		14	1.4	
Labour hold		Swing		
Labour hold		Swing		

=== Squires Gate ===
Squires Gate (2 seats)
Party	Candidate	Votes	%	±%
Conservative	Carl Mitchell	854	54.0	−2.8
Conservative	Gerard Walsh*	782	49.4	+2.9
Labour	Melanie Kelly	527	33.3	+0.2
Labour	Danny Rossie	454	28.7	−2.1
Green	Julie Daniels	178	11.3	−4.1
Reform	Kim Knight	136	8.6	N/A
Majority				
Turnout		1,583	31.32	
Rejected ballots		1	0.1	
Conservative hold		Swing		
Conservative hold		Swing		

=== Stanley ===
Stanley (2 seats)
Party	Candidate	Votes	%	±%
Conservative	Graham Baker*	796	64.1	+3.0
Conservative	Jason Roberts*	772	62.2	+3.9
Labour	Laura White	418	33.7	+6.9
Labour	Daniel Lovatt-Staines	412	33.2	+9.5
Majority				
Turnout		1,246	29.52	
Rejected ballots		5	0.4	
Conservative hold		Swing		
Conservative hold		Swing		

=== Talbot ===
Talbot (2 seats)
Party	Candidate	Votes	%	±%
Labour	Mark Smith*	595	56.3	+11.0
Labour	Jane Hugo*	572	54.2	+9.5
Conservative	Will Banks	321	30.4	−8.6
Conservative	Ian White	312	29.5	−7.4
Independent	Danny Gee	182	17.2	N/A
Majority				
Turnout		1,061	22.74	
Rejected ballots		5	0.5	
Labour hold		Swing		
Labour hold		Swing		

=== Tyldesley ===
Tyldesley (2 seats)
Party	Candidate	Votes	%	±%
Labour	Lisette Roe	640	49.3	+0.8
Labour	Portia Webb	599	46.1	−1.9
Conservative	Andrew Binns	473	36.4	+3.7
Conservative	John Ormston	421	32.4	+3.0
Green	Georgina Eastwood	148	11.4	−9.0
Reform	Paul Nield	88	6.8	N/A
Independent	William Gee	83	6.4	N/A
Majority				
Turnout		1,305	26.12	
Rejected ballots		6	0.5	
Labour hold		Swing		
Labour hold		Swing		

=== Victoria ===
Victoria (2 seats)
Party	Candidate	Votes	%	±%
Labour	Pam Brookes	490	51.9	−2.4
Labour	Fred Jackson*	468	49.6	−11.3
Conservative	Neil Harvey	337	35.7	+1.4
Conservative	Jacqui Frost	329	34.9	+3.4
Green	Tracey Booker	133	14.1	N/A
Majority				
Turnout		952	20.85	
Rejected ballots		8	0.8	
Labour hold		Swing		
Labour hold		Swing		

=== Warbreck ===
Warbreck (2 seats)
Party	Candidate	Votes	%	±%
Conservative	Danny Scott*	600	44.9	−8.6
Conservative	Michele Scott*	589	44.1	−7.9
Labour	Matthew Haynes	574	42.9	+12.2
Labour	Tommy Edwin Kirkwood	525	39.3	+10.9
Liberal Democrats	Kevan Benfold	158	11.8	−6.6
Liberal Democrats	Paul Hindley	147	11.0	N/A
Majority				
Turnout		1,343	26.54	
Rejected ballots		6	0.4	
Conservative hold		Swing		
Conservative hold		Swing		

=== Waterloo ===
Waterloo (2 seats)
Party	Candidate	Votes	%	±%
Labour	Simon Cartmell	564	39.2	+5.6
Conservative	Diane Marie Mitchell	509	35.3	−1.9
Labour	Luke Bodenham	493	34.2	+1.7
Conservative	Chris Higgitt	458	31.8	−1.5
Independent	Jim O'Neill	345	24.0	N/A
Green	Tina Rothery	170	11.8	−1.7
Reform	Derek Robertson*	166	11.5	−25.7
Majority				
Turnout		1,444	28.01	
Rejected ballots		4	0.3	
Labour hold		Swing		
Conservative hold		Swing		

== Changes 2023–2027 ==
- Following the 2023 election, the composition of the council was 28 Labour and 14 Conservative.
- On 17 May 2023, Bloomfield councillor Jim Hobson was administratively suspended by Labour. His suspension was lifted in late June 2023, and he was reinstated into the Labour group.
- In March 2025, Norbreck councillor Emma Ellison defected from the Conservatives to Reform UK.
- In May 2026, Squires Gate councillor Gerard Walsh defected from the Conservatives to Reform UK.
- Following Walsh's defection and the intervening by-elections, the council comprised 27 Labour, 11 Conservative and four Reform UK councillors.
- On 10 July 2026, Claremont councillor Ivan Taylor died.

=== By-elections ===
==== Marton ====
The Marton by-election was triggered by the resignation of Labour councillor Sarah Smith following her election as the Member of Parliament for Hyndburn at the 2024 United Kingdom general election.

Marton: 3 October 2024
Party	Candidate	Votes	%	±%
Reform	Jim O'Neill	462	38.8	+29.2
Labour	Sam Benson	334	28.0	–23.4
Conservative	Neil Harvey	254	21.3	–17.7
Independent	Andrew Stansfield	84	7.0	N/A
Liberal Democrats	Bill Greene	33	2.8	N/A
Green	Ben Thomas	25	2.1	N/A
Majority		128	10.8	N/A
Turnout		1,195	23.1	–8.2
Registered electors		5,169		
Reform gain from Labour		Swing	▲26.3	

==== Bispham ====
The Bispham by-election was triggered by the resignation of Conservative councillor Tony Warne following a change in his employment circumstances after becoming chair of an NHS trust.

Bispham: 7 November 2024
Party	Candidate	Votes	%	±%
Labour	Joel McKevitt	436	31.5	–16.6
Reform	William Banks	424	30.7	N/A
Conservative	Lynda Watson	314	22.7	–29.2
Independent	Rick Scott	148	10.7	N/A
Green	Ben Thomas	36	2.6	N/A
Liberal Democrats	Kevan Benfold	24	1.7	N/A
Majority		12	0.8	N/A
Turnout		1,384	31.4	+0.5
Registered electors		4,408		
Labour gain from Conservative				

==== Greenlands ====
The Greenlands by-election was triggered by the resignation of Labour councillor Julie Jones for family and health reasons.

Greenlands by-election: 18 December 2025
Party	Candidate	Votes	%	±%
Reform	Jonathan Morgan	587	44.4	+38.3
Conservative	Rick Scott	299	22.6	–17.0
Labour	Hattie Tollerson	289	21.9	–22.8
Green	Brenden John Wilkinson	79	6.0	–3.6
Liberal Democrats	Kevan Benfold	45	3.4	N/A
Independent	Jayden James Gaskin	22	1.7	N/A
Majority		288	21.8	N/A
Turnout		1,325	24.7	–6.9
Registered electors		5,356		
Reform gain from Labour				

==== Claremont ====
Claremont by-election: 1 October 2026
Party	Candidate	Votes	%	±%
Labour	Katie Donnelli-Hunn	458	41.8	−10.5
Reform	Mark Butcher	419	38.2	New
Restore	Paula Brooksbank	79	7.2	New
Conservative	John Thomson	62	5.7	−15.9
Green	Rob Jones	44	4.0	New
Liberal Democrats	Kevan Benfold	18	1.6	−10.4
Independent	Kim Knight	16	1.5	New
Majority		39	3.6	
Rejected ballots		3	0.3	
Turnout		1,099	22.0	+2.8
Registered electors		4,991		
Labour hold		Swing	-24.4	
