= Edwin Hughes (soldier) =

British soldier

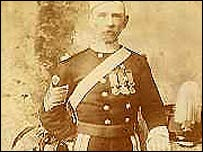
- Edwin Hughes in about 1873
- Born: 12 December 1830; Wrexham, Wales
- Died: 18 May 1927 (aged 96); Blackpool, England
- Burial place: Layton Cemetery, Blackpool
- Military career
- Allegiance: United Kingdom
- Branch: British Army
- Service years: 1852–1873
- Rank: Troop Sergeant Major
- Nickname: Balaclava Ned
- Unit: 13th Light Dragoons
- Conflicts: Crimean War: Battle of Balaclava; Battle of Inkerman; Siege of Sevastopol

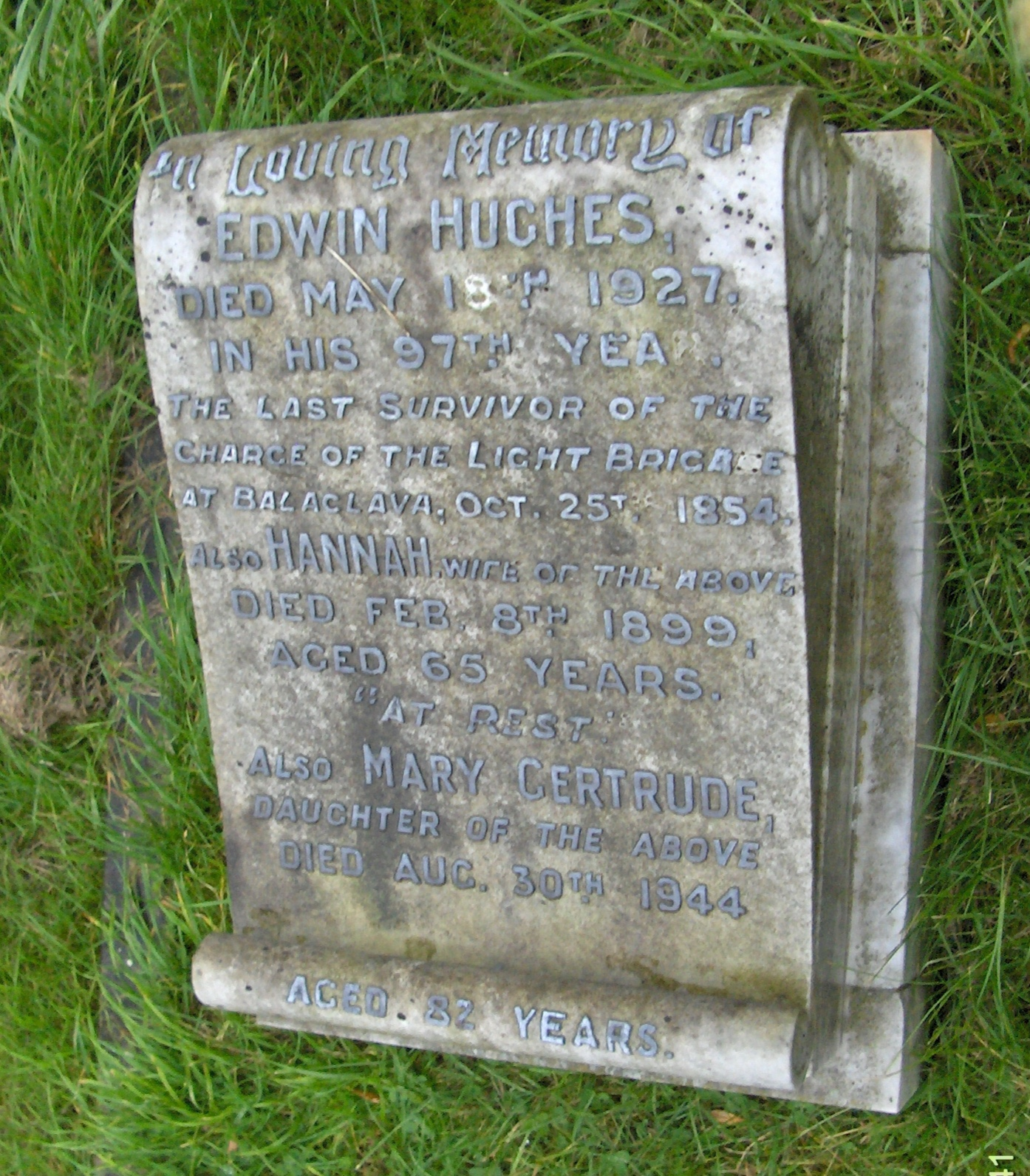
Edwin Hughes's grave, 2008

Edwin Hughes (12 December 1830 – 18 May 1927), nicknamed "Balaclava Ned", was a British Army soldier and the last survivor of the famous Charge of the Light Brigade during the Crimean War of 1854–56.

== Early life ==
Hughes was born in Wrexham, Wales, on 12 December 1830, one of nine children to William (a tin-plate worker) and Mary (née Jones) Hughes. He was baptised at St Giles' Church, Wrexham, on 5 January 1831. Hughes became a shoemaker until he joined the 13th Light Dragoons, part of the Light Brigade, at Liverpool on 1 November 1852. He joined his regiment at Hounslow as 1506 Private Hughes, and in 1854 he sailed with them from Portsmouth to the Crimea.

== Crimean War ==
On 25 October 1854 Hughes rode in the charge of the Light Brigade during the Battle of Balaclava, where his horse was killed under him, trapping his leg. Of the charge, he later said:

I was on duty that day from four o'clock in the morning until after the charge in the afternoon. We rode out at the command straight for the Russian lines. Before we reached them, my horse was shot, and in falling on its side I got partially pinned underneath injuring my leg. I was assisted away.

Returning to British lines after the charge, Hughes was put in charge of the Russian prisoners. He was also present at the Battle of Inkerman on 5 November 1854 and throughout the siege and eventual capture of Sevastopol. At the end of the war he was awarded the Crimea Medal with clasps for Alma, Balaclava, Inkerman and Sevastopol, and the Turkish Crimea Medal.

== Later career ==
In 1858 Hughes was promoted to corporal, in 1863 to sergeant, and in 1871 to troop sergeant major. On 24 November 1873 he was discharged from the army at Colchester Garrison at his own request, having completed 21 years and 24 days service. He was presented with a marble clock by the non-commissioned officers of the 13th Hussars, as the 13th Light Dragoons had become. He was also awarded the Army Long Service and Good Conduct Medal. His discharge papers describe him as being 42 11/12ths years of age, 5 feet nine inches tall, of fresh complexion with sandy hair and hazel eyes.

The day after leaving the army Hughes enlisted in the Worcestershire Yeomanry (a mounted volunteer unit), staying as sergeant-instructor until 5 January 1886. He was discharged on account of having reached retirement age. At this time Hughes was living in Birmingham.

== Later life ==
Hughes married a woman called Hannah, who died in 1899; they had two sons and two daughters. One of his daughters never married, and in 1910 he went to live with her in Blackpool. Hughes was a member of the Balaclava Commemoration Society, and attended the reunions for survivors of the Charge of the Light Brigade in 1895, 1910, 1912 and 1913. He received a pension from the T. H. Roberts Fund, which had been set up for the soldiers in the Charge who had fallen on hard times, and was also granted a pension from the Royal Patriotic Fund. With the death of William Henry Pennington of the 11th Hussars in May 1923, Hughes was the last survivor of the Charge, and in 1925 the various relief funds ran out. The War Office made a special grant to him, which he continued to receive until his death on 18 May 1927.

Hughes was buried with full military honours in Layton Cemetery in Blackpool. A memorial plaque was unveiled in tribute to his memory on his former home in Mount Street, Wrexham, in October 1993.

His three medals were sold at auction in 2005, realising £16,000.
