= Fylde Coast =

- Proposed unitary authority area
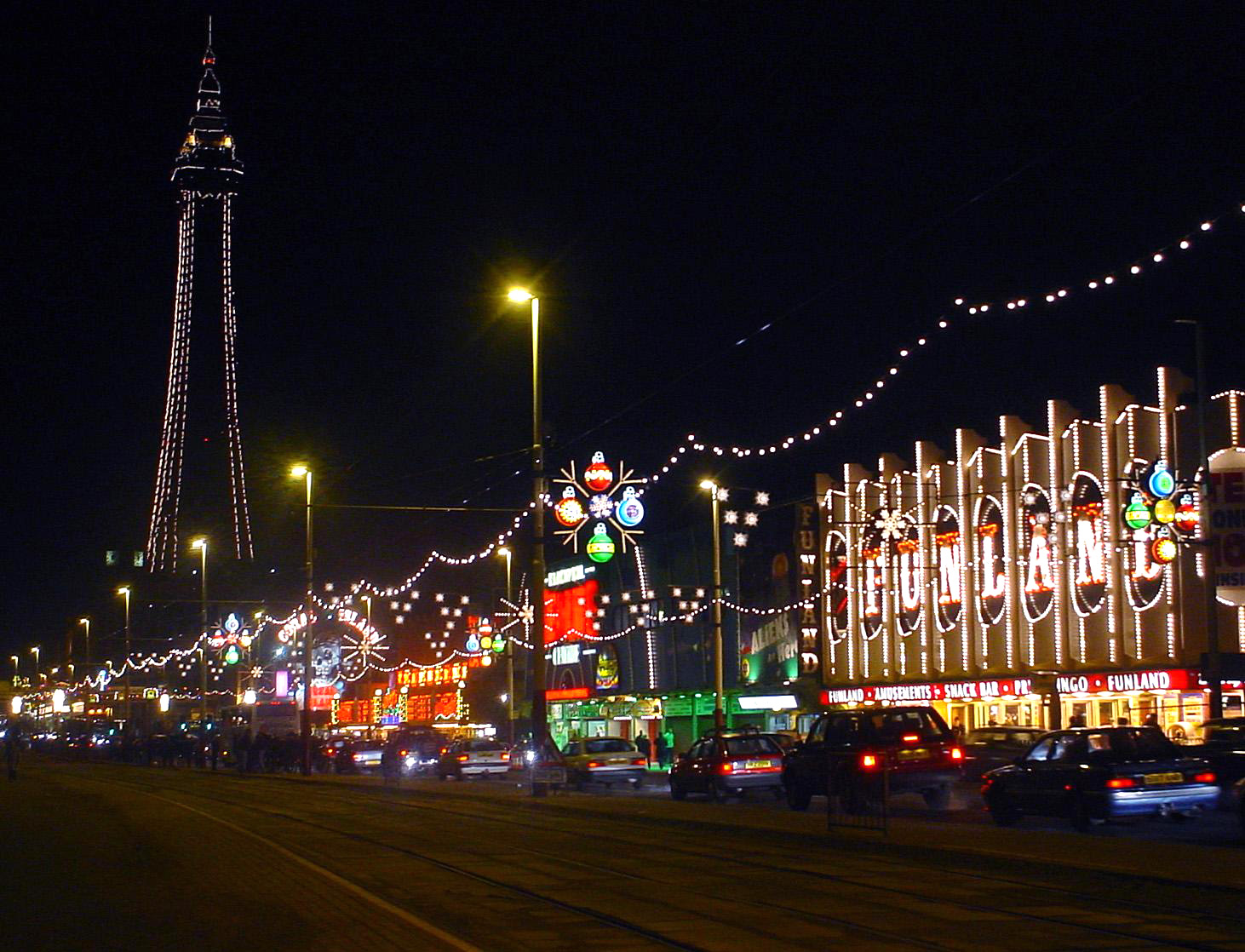
- Blackpool Illuminations

- Coordinates: 53.8184°N 3.0546°W
- Sovereign state: United Kingdom
- Country: England
- Region: North West
- Ceremonial county: Lancashire

Government
  - Type: Unitary authority
  - Body: Fylde Coast Council

Area
  - Total: 186.56 sq mi (483.18 km^{2})

Population (2024 estimate)
  - Total: 348,381
- Time zone: UTC+0 (GMT)
  - Summer (DST): UTC+1 (BST)

Fylde Coast was a proposed unitary authority area. It was intended to be established on 1 April 2028 and to occupy the west of the ceremonial county of Lancashire, England. It would have replaced the current non-metropolitan districts of Fylde and Wyre and the unitary authority area of Blackpool, and its unitary council would provide all of the local government services currently provided by Lancashire County Council, Blackpool Council, and the two district councils. Elections to the council were expected to take place in May 2027. During discussions about the reorganisation, the area was sometimes referred to as West Lancashire. The new area would have bordered two of the other three proposed Lancashire unitary authority areas: North Lancashire to the east and South Lancashire to the south; the third new unitary authority area is Pennine Lancashire. The settlements in Fylde Coast would have included Blackpool, Lytham St Annes, and Fleetwood, all of which are on the west coast, and Kirkham and Garstang inland. The population of the new area is approximately 348,381. Plans to create it were halted in September 2026 and the 2027 election was cancelled. In October 2026, the plans to create it were withdrawn.

== Background ==
Fylde Coast is being created as part of a wider reorganisation of local government in England that is intended to introduce single-tier local government in fourteen areas.

For local government purposes, Lancashire before this reorganisation comprises a non-metropolitan county, itself divided into twelve non-metropolitan districts, and the two unitary authority areas of Blackpool and Blackburn with Darwen. In Blackpool and Blackburn with Darwen all local government services are provided by their respective councils, whereas in the rest of the county the provision of services is divided between Lancashire County Council and the twelve district councils.

Local government in Lancashire will be reorganised by abolishing all of the areas and councils mentioned above and replacing them with four new unitary authority areas, the councils of which will provide all local government services.

In September 2026, the Lancashire proposals were halted by the government and placed under review. The 2027 election was cancelled. In October 2026, plans to create it were withdrawn. The decision was threatened with judicial review by Lancashire County Council.

== Governance ==
It would have been run by Fylde Coast Council, which would have comprised 74 councillors.

== Parishes ==
Blackpool, Poulton-le-Fylde and Thornton-Cleveleys are currently unparished, the rest of the area is parished.
