= Layton cemetery =

Cemetery in Lancashire, England

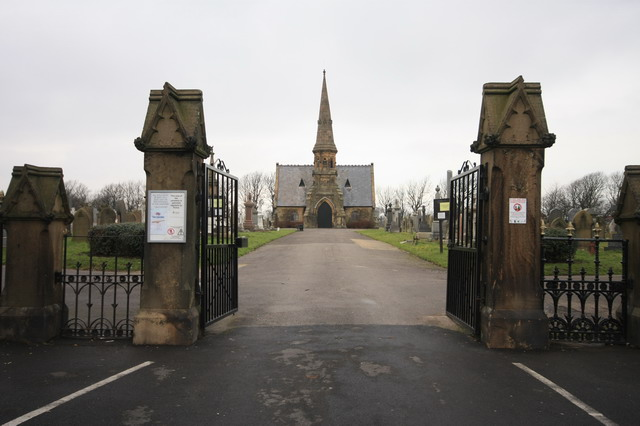
- The entrance to Layton Cemetery, with the mortuary chapel
- Interactive map of Layton cemetery

Details
- Established: 1873
- Location: Blackpool, Lancashire
- Country: England
- Coordinates: 53.8295°N 3.0343°W
- Type: Public
- Owned by: Blackpool Council
- Size: 30 acres (12 ha)
- Find a Grave: Layton cemetery

Layton cemetery is a graveyard located at Talbot Road in Blackpool, Lancashire in England. It was opened in 1873 when Blackpool parish church was replete with burying. The site encompasses 30 acres (120,000 m^{2}), having been regularly expanded during its history. It is administered by Blackpool Council. A number of memorials in the cemetery are executed in Portland stone.

The cemetery was designed and laid out by Garlick, Park and Sykes, architects of Preston. Originally there were three mortuary chapels, Anglican, Catholic and Non-Conformist, but only the Anglican remains. The lodge at the entrance is now used as the cemetery office, situated to the right of the main gates on Talbot Road, it is currently occupied by the friends group, although originally it is where John Wray, the Superintendent & registrar, resided with his wife and their brood of children. Records show that by 1891 eleven people dwelled within the bijou cottage! He recorded burials, exhumations and unusual incidents in copper-plate handwriting from within his office which was also situated inside the lodge. The original part of the cemetery was surrounded a stone wall, topped with iron railings with a double iron gate at the entrance. These structures are extant. A World War I memorial is centrally situated.

In the 1930s, the cemetery was rapidly nearing capacity and therefore a new cemetery and crematorium were opened, known as Carleton Crematorium and Cemetery. Layton Cemetery is now replete but interments are permitted in existing graves.

== Notable interments ==
- Dick Barlow, England test cricketer
- John Bickerstaffe, philanthropist and mayor of Blackpool
- Gerald Irving Richardson, Superintendent of Lancashire Constabulary. Posthumously awarded the George Cross.
- George Washington Williams, Afro-American historian
- Samuel Laycock, dialect poet
- Edwin Hughes, last survivor of the Charge of the Light Brigade
- Alfred Tysoe, British athlete, winner of two gold medals at the 1900 Olympic Games
- Spencer Timothy Hall, writer and mesmerist
- Ada Boswell, Queen of the Gypsies
- Joe Longthorne, entertainer
- Jesse Pye. Footballer. Scored 2 goals for Wolves v Leicester in the 1949 FA Cup final and played for England

== War graves ==
Layton Cemetery contains the graves of 139 Commonwealth service personnel of World War I and 39 of World War II, besides, from the latter war, 26 airmen of the Polish Air Force (whose headquarters in exile were in Talbot Square in the town), and one airman of the Royal Yugoslav Air Force.

== Gallery ==
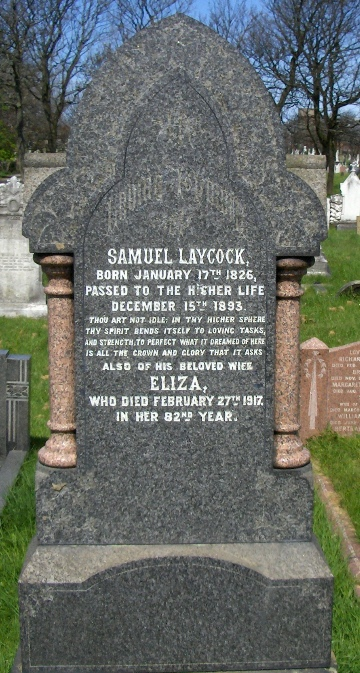
Samuel Laycock's grave

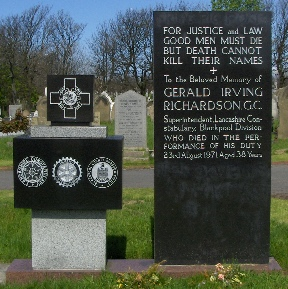
Gerald Richardson's grave

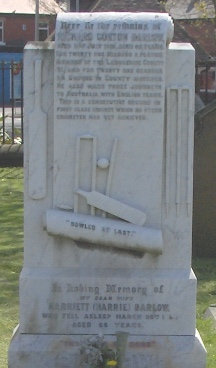
Dick Barlow's grave

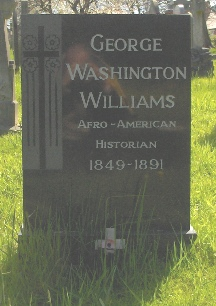
George Washington Williams' grave

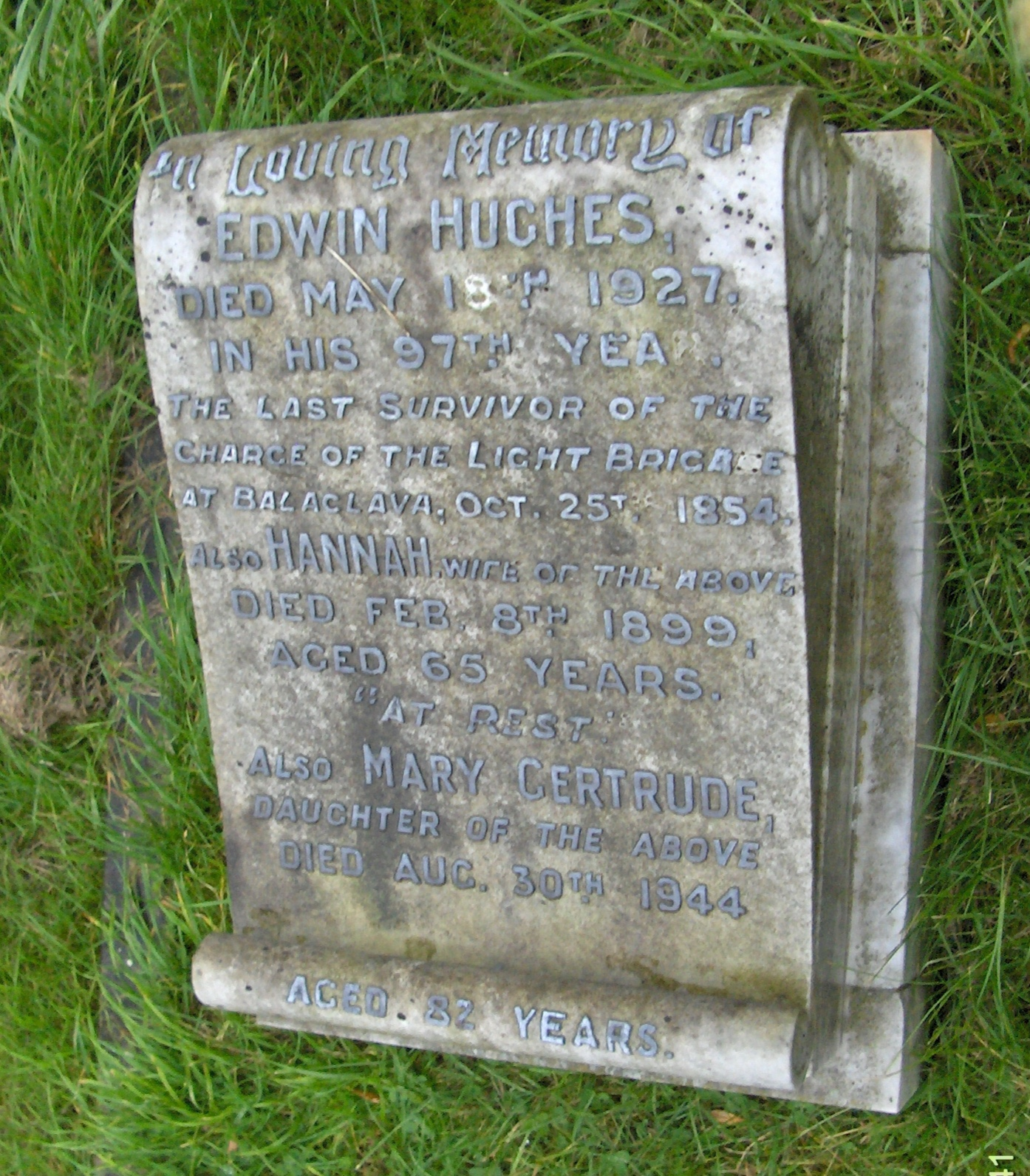
Edwin Hughes' grave

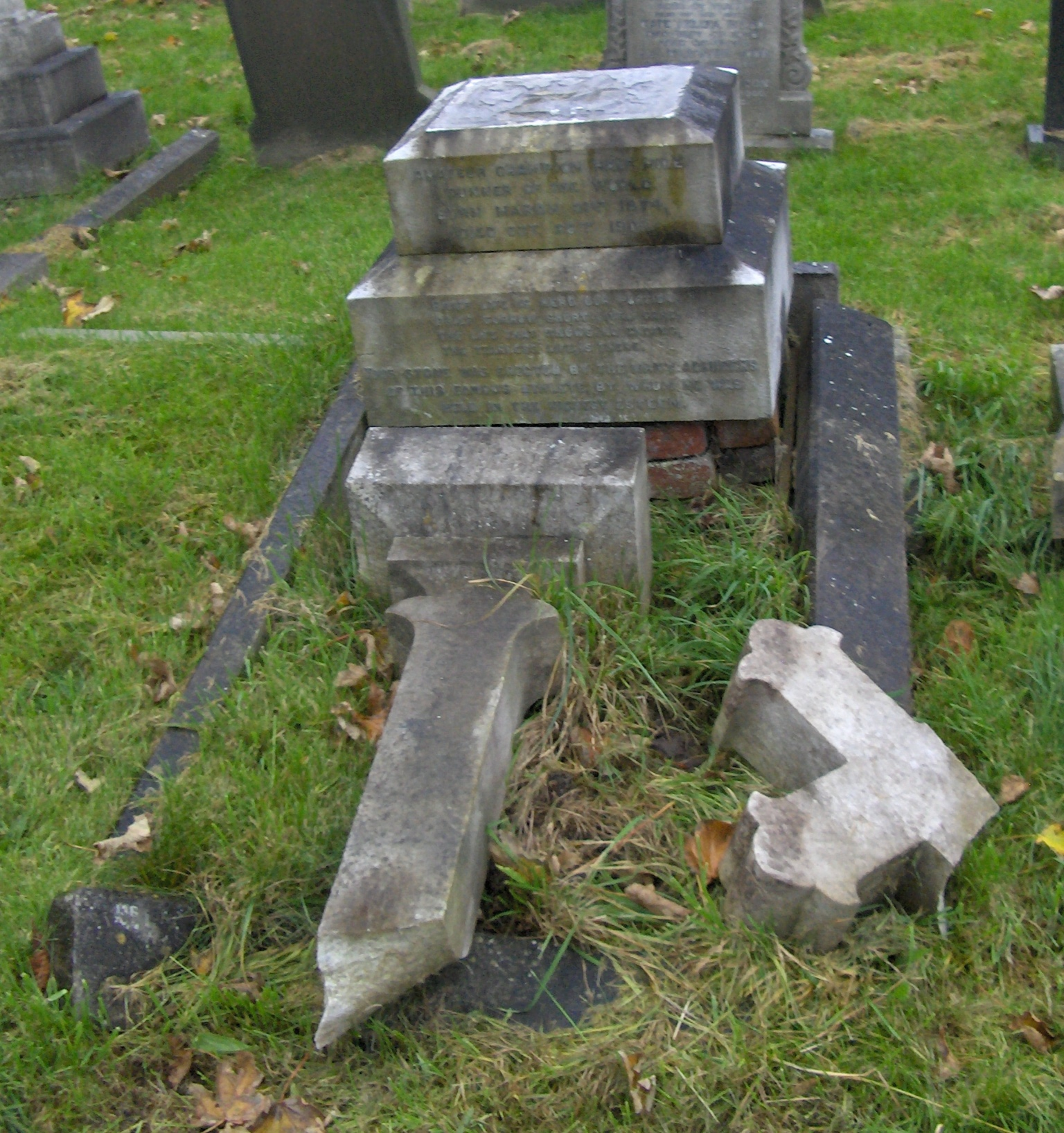
Alfred Tysoe's grave

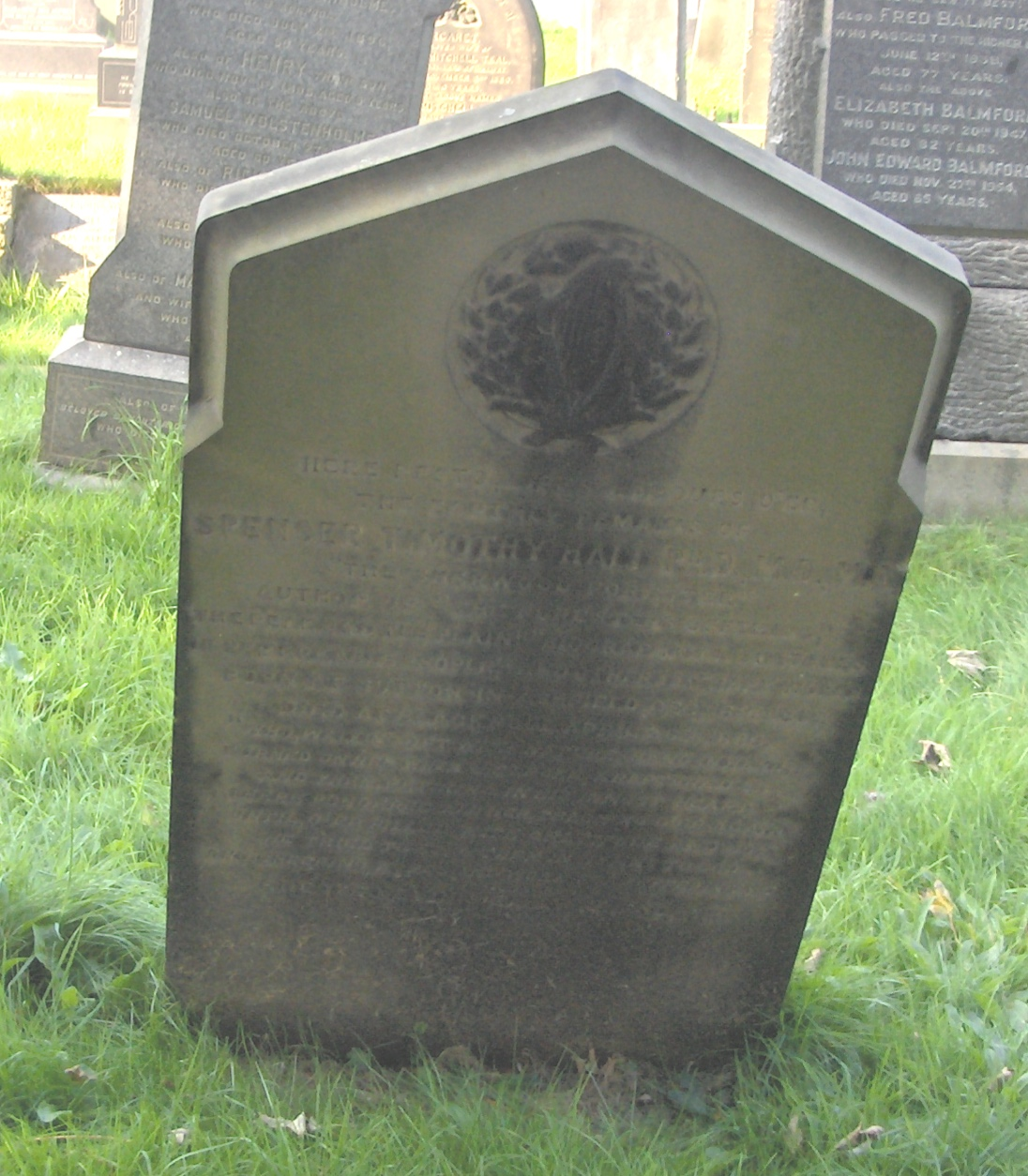
Spencer Timothy Hall's grave

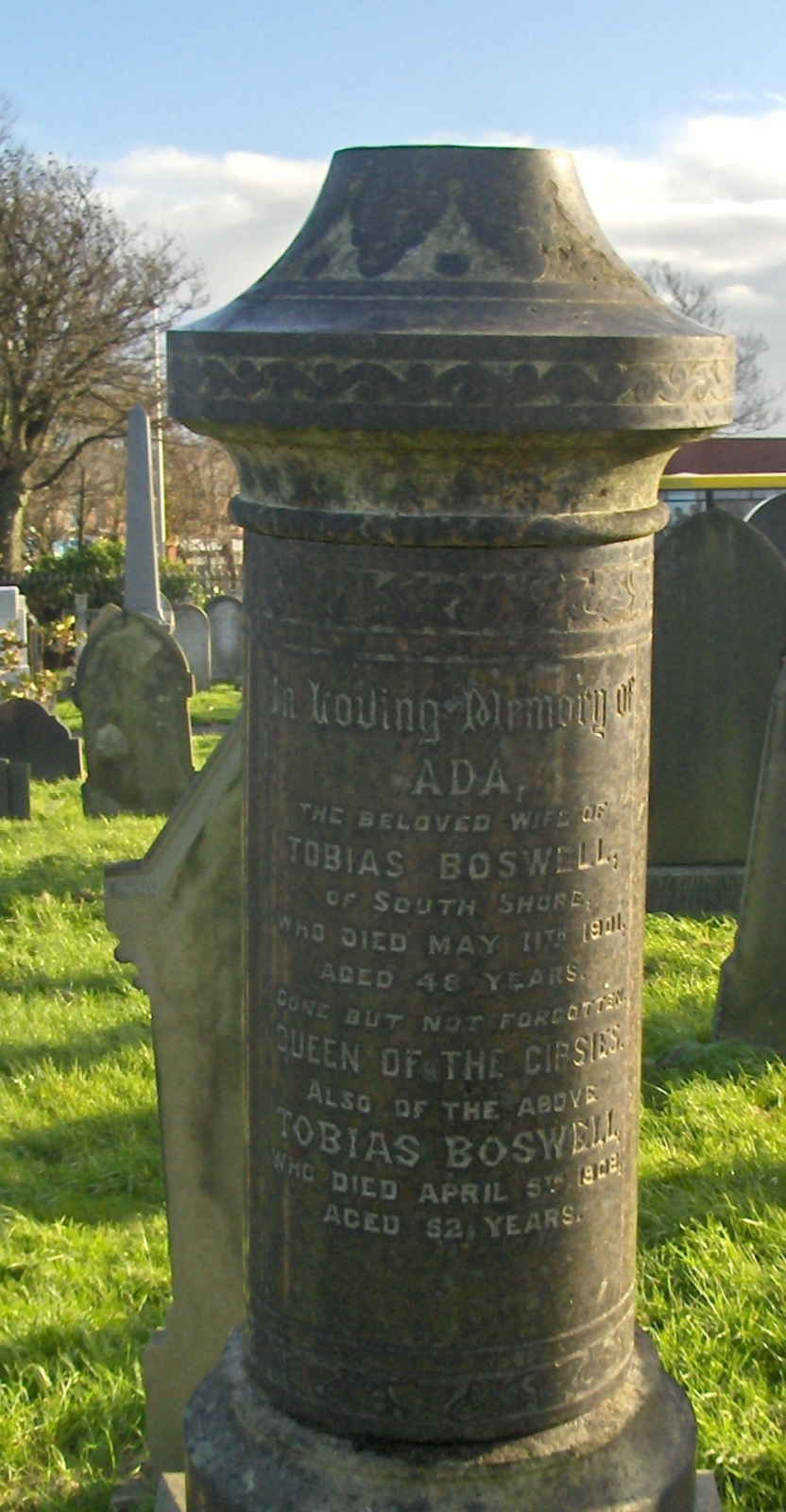
Ada Boswell's grave
