= North Lancashire (unitary authority area) =

- Proposed unitary authority area
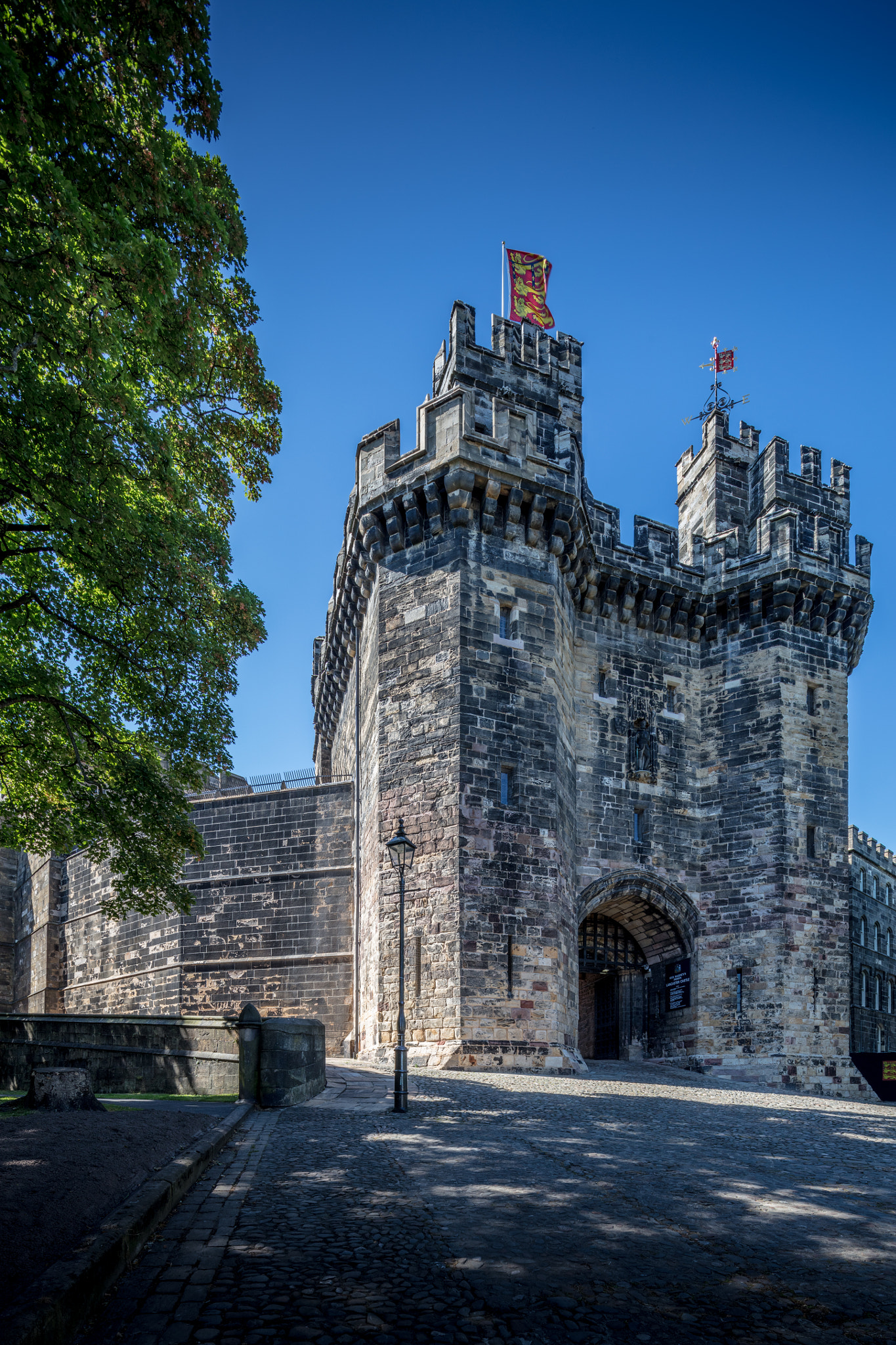
- Lancaster Castle

- Coordinates: 53.7598°N 2.6988°W
- Sovereign state: United Kingdom
- Country: England
- Region: North West
- Ceremonial county & combined county authority: Lancashire

Government
  - Type: Unitary authority
  - Body: North Lancashire Council

Area
  - Total: 502.5 sq mi (1,301.4 km^{2})

Population (2024 estimate)
  - Total: 373,664
- Time zone: UTC+0 (GMT)
  - Summer (DST): UTC+1 (BST)

North Lancashire was a proposed unitary authority area in north and east Lancashire, England. It was intended to be established on 1 April 2028. Elections to the new council were expected to take place in May 2027.

It was to replace the current districts of Lancaster, Preston, and Ribble Valley. The new area would have bordered the other three new Lancashire unitary authority areas: Pennine Lancashire to the south-east, South Lancashire to the south, and Fylde Coast to the west. It was to have bordered the unitary authority areas of Westmorland and Furness to the north and North Yorkshire to the east.

The north-west part of the area is on Morecambe Bay. Larger populated places in the area, from north to south, are to be; Morecambe and Lancaster in the north, Clitheroe in the south-east, and Longridge and Preston in the south. The population of the new area is approximately 373,664. It would have included the majority of the Forest of Bowland and part of Arnside and Silverdale, both of which have been designated national landscapes, while a small area in the north-east, including Leck and the summit of Gragareth, will be within the Yorkshire Dales National Park.

Plans to create it were halted in September 2026 and the 2027 election was cancelled. In October 2026, the plans to create it were withdrawn.

== Background ==
North Lancashire is being created as part of a wider reorganisation of local government in England that is intended to introduce single-tier local government in fourteen areas.

For local government purposes, Lancashire currently comprises a non-metropolitan county, itself divided into twelve non-metropolitan districts, and the two unitary authority areas of Blackpool and Blackburn with Darwen. In Blackpool and Blackburn with Darwen all local government services are provided by their respective councils, whereas in the rest of the county the provision of services is divided between Lancashire County Council and the twelve district councils.

Local government in Lancashire was to have been reorganised by abolishing all of the areas and councils mentioned above and replacing them with four new unitary authority areas, the councils of which would have provided all local government services.

In September 2026, the Lancashire proposals were halted by the government and placed under review. The 2027 election was cancelled. In October 2026, plans to create it were withdrawn. The decision was threatened with judicial review by Lancashire County Council.

== Naming ==
The name of the proposed authority remained unsettled following the government's announcement. On 17 August 2026, officials coordinating local government reorganisation in Lancashire stated that the existing councils had been unable to reach unanimous agreement on the names of the four new authorities. The names specified by the government, including North Lancashire, would therefore continue to be used for official purposes pending their inclusion in the Structural Changes Order.

On 19 August 2026 the leaders of Lancaster City Council, Preston City Council and Ribble Valley Borough Council wrote a joint letter to the Ministry of Housing, Communities and Local Government, proposing that the new authority should instead be named Lancaster, Preston & Ribble Valley Council. The council leaders argued that the alternative would better preserve the identities and national recognition of the three existing areas. Ribble Valley council leader Simon Hore described "North Lancashire" as a "holding title" and said it was less accurate and descriptive than the proposed alternative.

The proposal was opposed by Cat Smith, MP for Lancaster and Wyre, and Lizzi Collinge, MP for Morecambe and Lunesdale, both of whom supported retaining the name "North Lancashire". Collinge argued that naming only Lancaster, Preston and Ribble Valley risked excluding other communities within the authority, while Smith described "North Lancashire" as a straightforward geographical description.

Sir Mark Hendrick, MP for Preston, also opposed the three-place-name proposal but suggested Central and North Lancashire as an alternative. Hendrick argued that Preston is traditionally associated with Central Lancashire and that retaining "Central Lancashire" within the new authority's name would preserve an established regional identity.

The provisional names for the new unitary authorities have also been controversial in other areas, including the proposed South Lancashire unitary authority, which broadly sits in an area historically referred to as being part of Central Lancashire.

== Governance ==
North Lancashire was to be governed by North Lancashire Council, which would have comprised 72 councillors.

== Parishes ==
Most of the district is part of a civil parish. Lancaster and Heysham in the north and Preston and Fulwood in the south are unparished areas. Lancaster City Council is considering the possibility of parishing Lancaster and Heysham, which would allow them to have town councils and maintain municipal continuity after 2028. Another option for maintaining mayoralties in these areas would be charter trustees.
