= Pennine Lancashire =

- Proposed unitary authority area
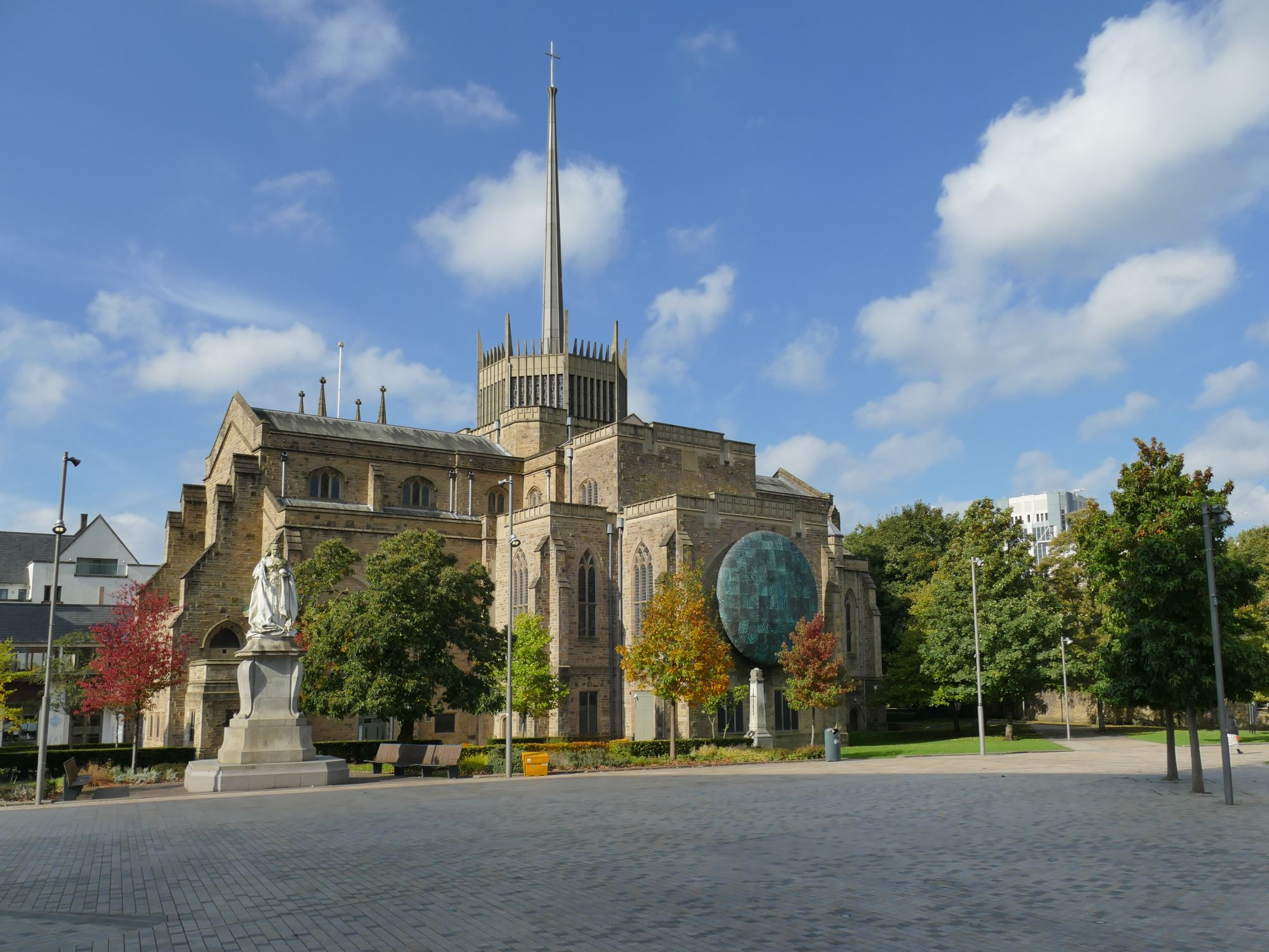
- Blackburn Cathedral

- Coordinates: 53.75°N 2.484°W
- Sovereign state: United Kingdom
- Country: England
- Region: North West
- Ceremonial county: Lancashire

Government
  - Type: Future Unitary authority
  - Body: Pennine Lancashire Council

Area
  - Total: 242.51 sq mi (628.09 km^{2})

Population (2024 estimate)
  - Total: 520,653
- Time zone: UTC+0 (GMT)
  - Summer (DST): UTC+1 (BST)

Pennine Lancashire or East Lancashire (Note: During the reorganisation the area was sometimes referred to as East Lancashire.) was a proposed unitary authority area in south-east Lancashire, England. It was intended to be established on 1 April 2028. The area would have covered the current districts of Burnley, Hyndburn, Pendle and Rossendale and the unitary authority area of Blackburn with Darwen, The area's unitary council would have provided all of the local government services currently provided by Lancashire County Council, the four district councils, and Blackburn with Darwen Borough Council. Elections to the new council were planned to take place in May 2027.

The new area would have bordered two of the other three new Lancashire unitary authority areas: North Lancashire to the east and South Lancashire to the west; the third new unitary authority area is Fylde Coast.

Pennine Lancashire would also have bordered the counties of North Yorkshire and West Yorkshire to the east and Greater Manchester to the south. The settlements in Pennine Lancashire would have included Blackburn (the most populated), Burnley, Accrington, Nelson, and Rawtenstall. The area's population is estimated to be 520,653.

Plans to create it were halted in September 2026 and the 2027 election was cancelled. In October 2026, the plans to create it were withdrawn.

== Background ==
Pennine Lancashire is being created as part of a wider reorganisation of local government in England that is intended to introduce single-tier local government in fourteen areas.

For local government purposes, Lancashire before this reorganisation comprises a non-metropolitan county, itself divided into twelve non-metropolitan districts, and the two unitary authority areas of Blackpool and Blackburn with Darwen. In Blackpool and Blackburn with Darwen all local government services are provided by their respective councils, whereas in the rest of the county the provision of services is divided between Lancashire County Council and the twelve district councils.

Local government in Lancashire would have been reorganised by abolishing all of the areas and councils mentioned above and replacing them with four new unitary authority areas, the councils of which would have provided all local government services.

In September 2026, the Lancashire proposals were halted by the government and placed under review. The 2027 election was cancelled. In October 2026, plans to create it were withdrawn. The decision was threatened with judicial review by Lancashire County Council.

== Governance ==
It would have been run by Pennine Lancashire Council, which would have comprised 95 councillors.

== Parishes ==
Accrington, Bacup, Blackburn, Burnley, Church, Clayton-le-Moors, Great Harwood, Haslingden, Oswaldtwistle, Rawtenstall, Rishton and the Edenfield and Hoddlesden areas are currently unparished. These towns will likely become parishes or establish equivalent town councils providing lower tier community services such as allotments, parks, cleansing, managing community venues and becoming statutory consultees on planning applications or will become Charter Trustees if they hold a mayoralty such as Blackburn and Burnley. The rest of the area is parished.
