= Blackpool Council =

Local government in Lancashire, England

Type
- Type: Unitary authority of the Borough of Blackpool

Leadership
- Mayor: Danny Scott, Conservative since 13 May 2026
- Leader: Lynn Williams, Labour since 20 July 2020
- Chief Executive: Neil Jack since 21 July 2011

Structure
- Seats: 42 councillors
- Graph of the party split among 42 seats.
- Political groups: Administration (27) Labour (27) Other parties (15) Conservative (11) Reform (4)
- Length of term: 4 years

Elections
- Voting system: Plurality-at-large (Note: First-past-the-post used in by-elections.)
- Last election: 4 May 2023
- Next election: 6 May 2027

Motto
- Progress

Meeting place
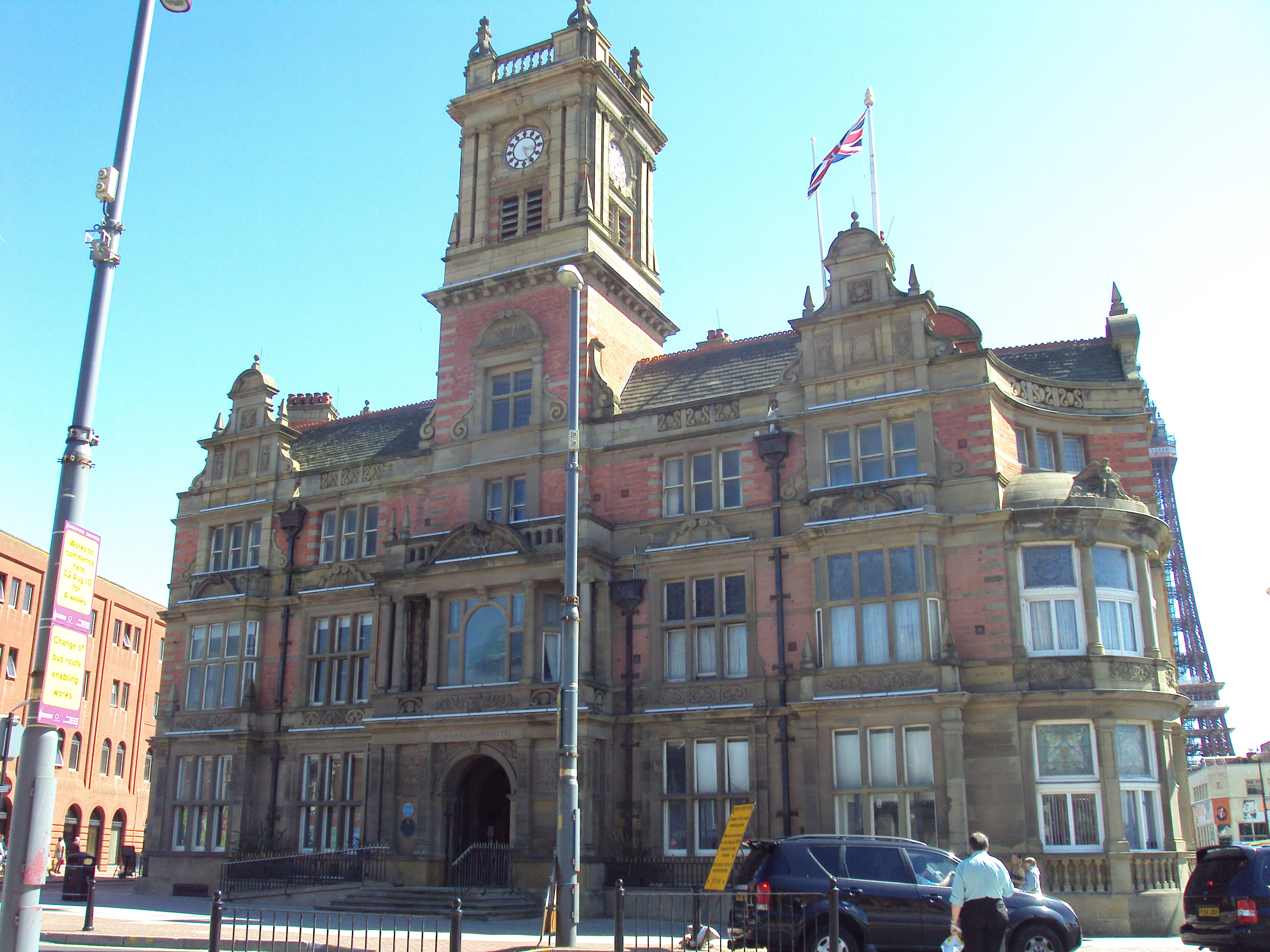
- Town Hall, Talbot Square, Blackpool, FY1 1GB

Website
- blackpool.gov.uk

Blackpool Council is the local authority of the Borough of Blackpool, in the ceremonial county of Lancashire, England. Since 1998 it has been a unitary authority, being a district council which also performs the functions of a county council; it is independent from Lancashire County Council. The borough council has been a member of the Lancashire Combined County Authority since its formation in 2025.

The council has been under Labour majority control since 1991. It meets at Blackpool Town Hall and has its offices in the adjoining Municipal Buildings and at Bickerstaffe Square.

== History ==
Blackpool's first elected local authority was the Layton with Warbreck Local Board, established in 1851 and named after the historic township that included the nascent town of Blackpool. The board was renamed the Blackpool Local Board in 1868. In 1876 the district was elevated to become a municipal borough, governed by a body formally called the "mayor, aldermen and burgesses of the borough of Blackpool", but generally known as the corporation, town council or borough council.

From 1904 to 1974, Blackpool was a county borough, independent from Lancashire County Council, whilst remaining part of the geographical county of Lancashire. In 1974 Blackpool was reconstituted as a non-metropolitan district under the Local Government Act 1972. It kept the same boundaries, but became a lower tier district authority with the county council providing county-level services to the town again.

The council became a unitary authority on 1 April 1998. The way the change was implemented was to create a new non-metropolitan county of Blackpool covering the same area as the borough, but with no separate county council; instead, the existing borough council took on county council functions. Blackpool remains part of the ceremonial county of Lancashire for the purposes of lieutenancy.

In 2025, the council became a member of the new Lancashire Combined County Authority.

In July 2026, the UK Government announced that Blackpool Council will be abolished as part of a local government reorganisation in Lancashire. Subject to Parliamentary approval, the council will cease to exist on 1 April 2028, when it will be replaced by the new Fylde Coast unitary authority (covering Fylde, Wyre, and Blackpool). Shadow elections for the new unitary councils are scheduled for May 2027.

== Governance ==
As a unitary authority, Blackpool Council provides both district-level and county-level functions. There are no civil parishes in the borough.

=== Political control ===
The council has been under Labour majority control since 1991, which therefore includes the whole period since the council became a unitary authority in 1998.

Political control of the council since the 1974 reforms took effect has been as follows:

Lower tier non-metropolitan district

Party in control	Years
Conservative	1974–1987
No overall control	1987–1991
Labour	1991–1998

Unitary authority

Party in control	Years
Labour	1998–2007
Conservative	2007–2011
Labour	2011–present

=== Leadership ===
The role of mayor is largely ceremonial in Blackpool. Political leadership is instead provided by the leader of the council. The leaders since 1991 have been:

Councillor	Party	From	To
Ivan Taylor	Labour	1991	5 Jun 2000
George Bancroft	Labour	Jul 2000	11 Jul 2001
Roy Fisher	Labour	Aug 2001	May 2007
Peter Callow	Conservative	21 May 2007	May 2011
Simon Blackburn	Labour	23 May 2011	Jun 2020
Lynn Williams	Labour	20 Jul 2020	

=== Current Composition ===
Following the 2023 election, and subsequent by-elections and changes of allegiance up to July 2026, the composition of the council was as follows:

Party	Seats
Labour	27
Conservative	11
Reform	4
Total	42

== Elections ==
Since the last boundary changes in 2023 the council has comprised 42 councillors representing 21 wards, with each ward electing two councillors. The whole council is elected together every four years.

== Premises ==
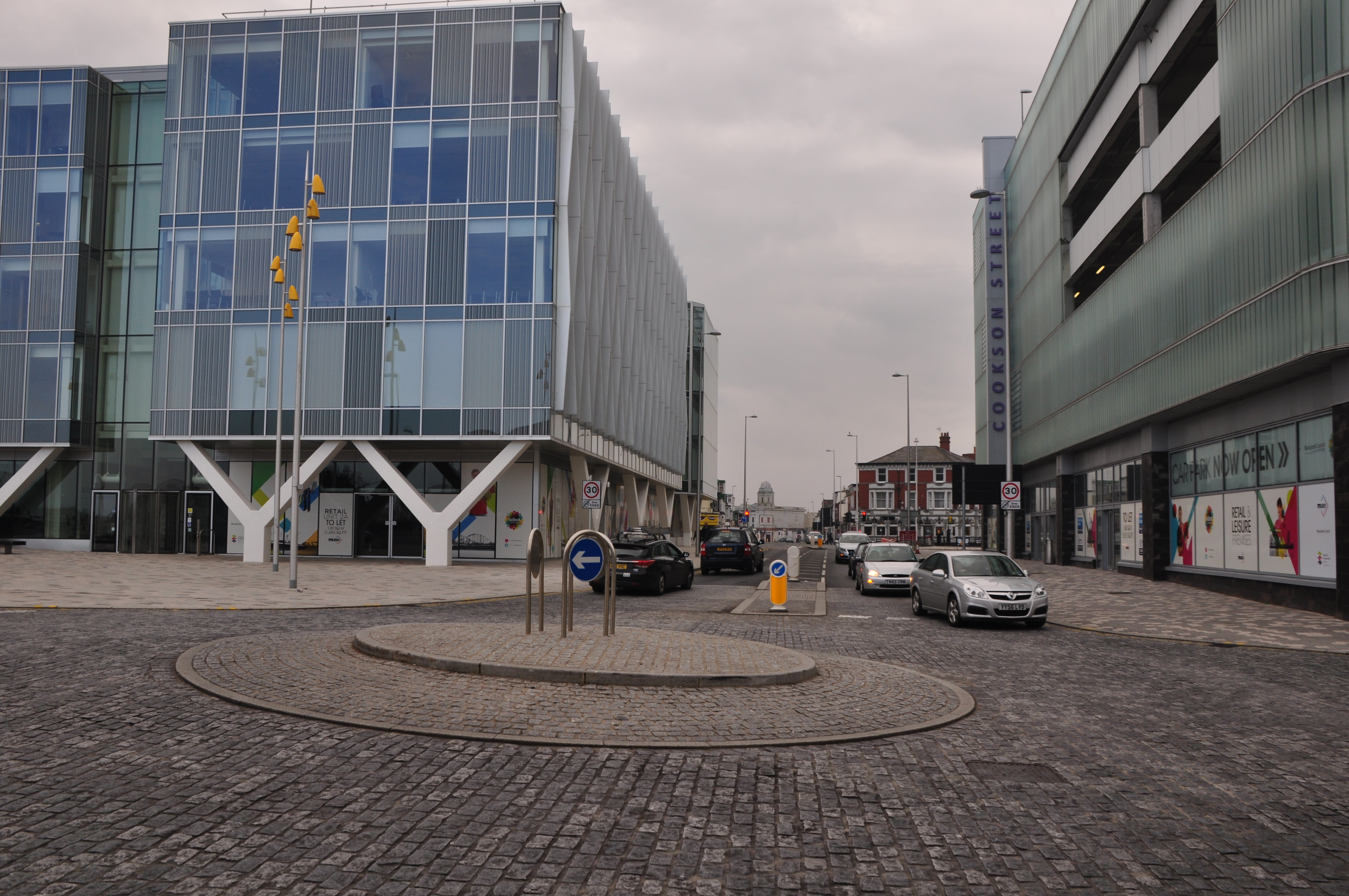
One Bickerstaffe Square (left)

The council meets at Blackpool Town Hall on Talbot Square. The building was completed in 1900.

The council's offices are split between the Municipal Buildings on Corporation Street, immediately adjoining the rear of the Town Hall, and One Bickerstaffe Square, a modern building near Blackpool North railway station, completed in 2014.
