= South Lancashire (unitary authority area) =

- Proposed unitary authority area
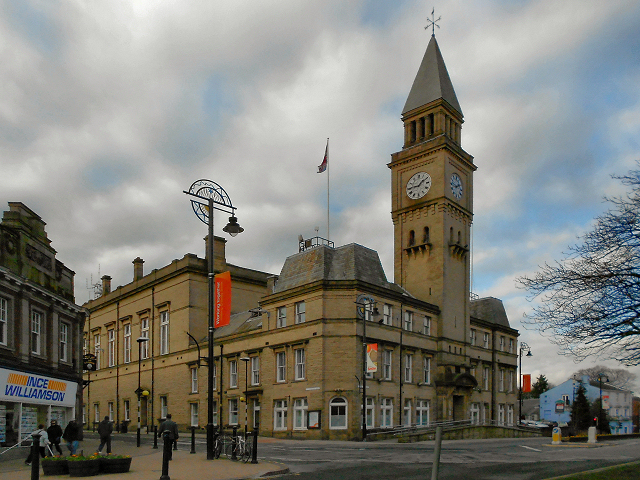
- Chorley Town Hall

- Coordinates: 53.6539°N 2.6332°W
- Sovereign state: United Kingdom
- Country: England
- Region: North West
- Ceremonial county: Lancashire

Government
  - Type: Unitary authority
  - Body: South Lancashire Council

Area
  - Total: 255.8 sq mi (662.6 km^{2})

Population (2024 estimate)
  - Total: 358,947
- Time zone: UTC+0 (GMT)
  - Summer (DST): UTC+1 (BST)

South Lancashire was a proposed unitary authority area that was planned to be established on 1 April 2028 and to occupy the central part of the historic county and south-west parts of the ceremonial county of Lancashire, England. It would have replaced the current non-metropolitan districts of Chorley, South Ribble, and West Lancashire, and its unitary council would have provided all of the local government services currently provided by Lancashire County Council and the district councils. Elections to a shadow South Lancashire Council were expected to take place in May 2027.

The new area would have bordered the other three new Lancashire unitary authority areas; Fylde Coast and North Lancashire to the north, and Pennine Lancashire to the east. It would have bordered the county of Greater Manchester to the south-west, and Merseyside to the south and west. Settlements within the district include Bamber Bridge, Chorley, Leyland, Ormskirk and Skelmersdale. The population of the new area is approximately 358,947.

Plans to create it were halted in September 2026 and the 2027 election was cancelled. In October 2026, the plans to create it were withdrawn.

== Background ==
South Lancashire is being created as part of a wider reorganisation of local government in England that is intended to introduce single-tier local government in fourteen areas.

For local government purposes, Lancashire currently comprises a non-metropolitan county, itself divided into twelve non-metropolitan districts, and the two unitary authority areas of Blackpool and Blackburn with Darwen. In Blackpool and Blackburn with Darwen all local government services are provided by their respective councils, whereas in the rest of the county the provision of services is divided between Lancashire County Council and the twelve district councils.

Local government in Lancashire would have been reorganised by abolishing all of the areas and councils mentioned above and replacing them with four new unitary authority areas, the councils of which would provide all local government services.

The proposed name "South Lancashire" was criticised by the Association of British Counties, which argued that it should be named "Central Lancashire" because the county historically encompassed areas further south of the proposed authority.

In September 2026, the Lancashire proposals were halted by the government and placed under review. The 2027 election was cancelled. In October 2026, plans to create it were withdrawn. The decision was threatened with judicial review by Lancashire County Council.

== Governance ==
It would have been run by the provisionally named South Lancashire Council, which would have comprised 72 councillors.

== Parishes ==
Chorley, Leyland, Ormskirk, Bamber Bridge/Walton-le-Dale and the Skelmersdale area are currently unparished, the rest of the area is parished. South Ribble council has suggested creating parishes in the unparished area of the borough.
