= Blackpool Town Hall =

Municipal building in Blackpool, Lancashire, England

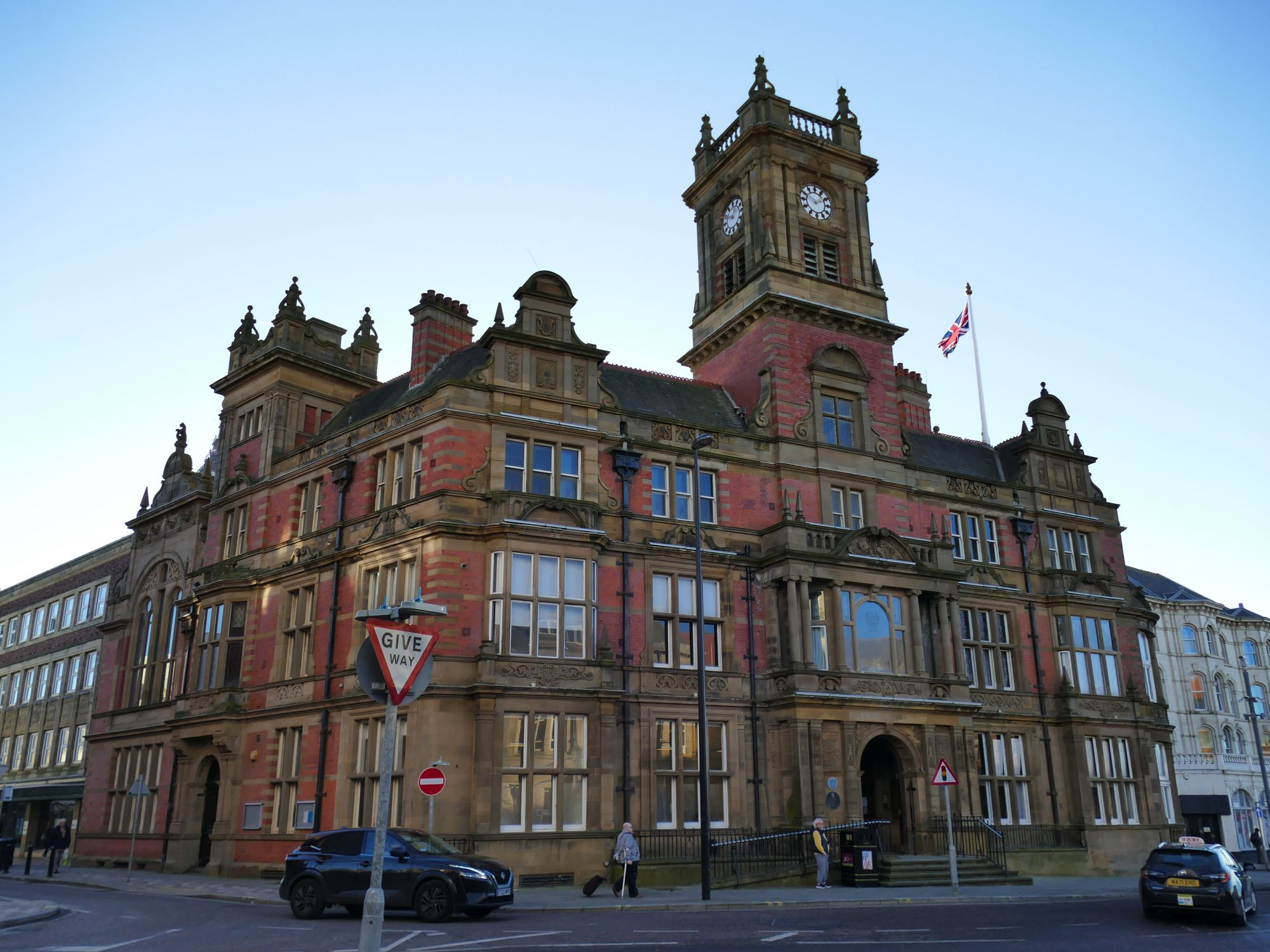
- Pictured in 2023

- Shown in Lancashire Location in Blackpool
- 53.8185°N 3.0546°W
- Location: Talbot Square, Blackpool

History
- Built: 1900

Site notes
- Area: Borough of Blackpool
- Architect: Potts, Son and Hennings
- Architectural style: Jacobean style

Listed Building – Grade II
- Designated: 11 January 1974
- Reference no.: 1205893

Blackpool Town Hall is a municipal building in Talbot Square, Blackpool, England. The town hall is the headquarters of Blackpool Council, which is the main governing body for the wider Borough of Blackpool. It is a Grade II listed building.

== History ==
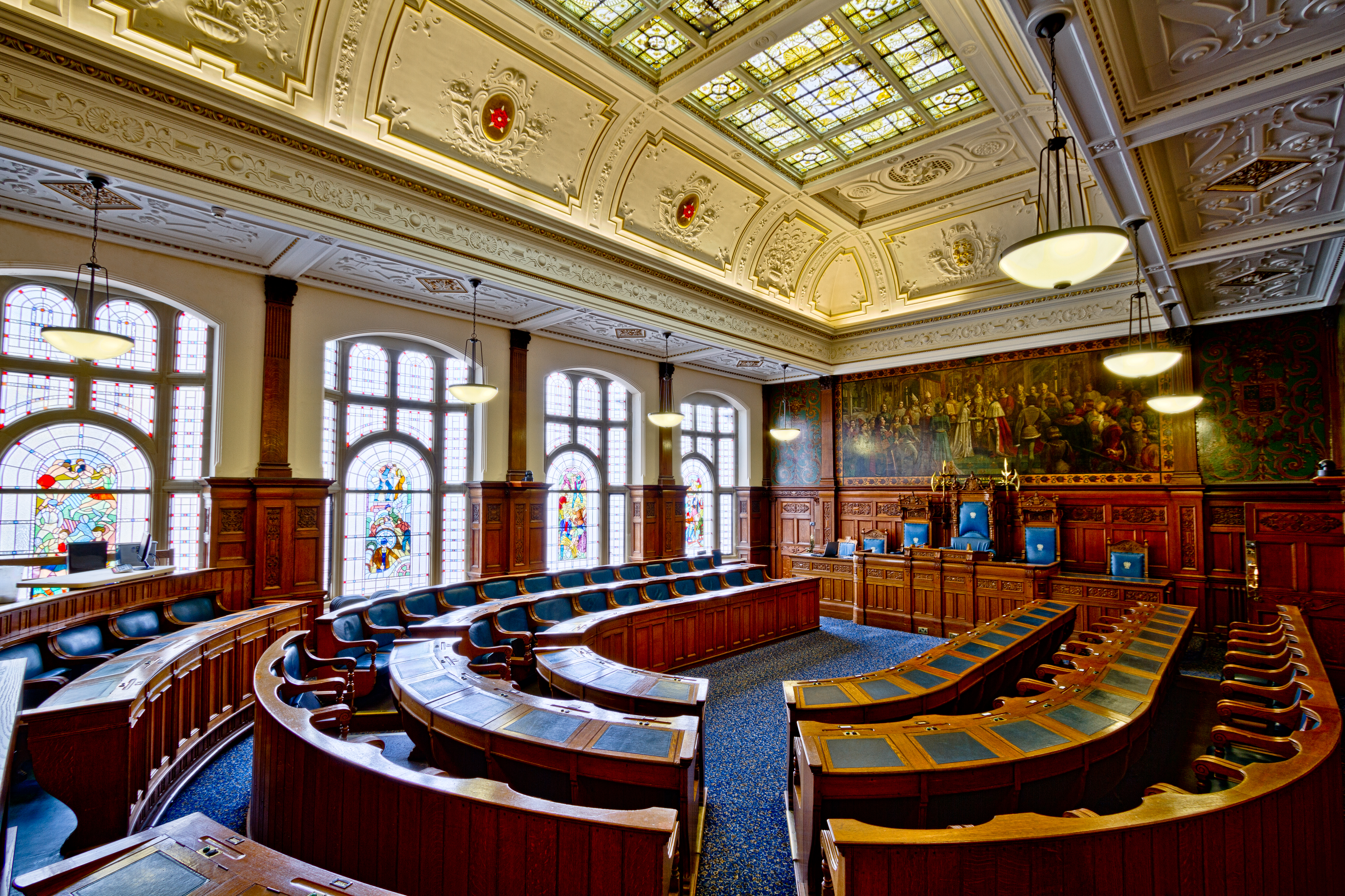
The Council Chamber.

The building was commissioned to replace an 18th-century town hall located just to the south of the current structure close to the old St John's Market. The new building, which was designed by Potts, Son and Hennings in the Jacobean style, was built on Talbot Square and completed in 1900. The design involved a symmetrical main frontage with seven bays facing onto the Talbot Square with the outer bays curving round to the sides; the central bay featured a five-stage square clock tower with the ground floor forming a portico with Tuscan order pilasters and first floor forming a portico with Ionic order columns with a segmental pediment and a balustrade above. The ship's bell from HMS Foudroyant, which was wrecked on Blackpool Sands in 1897, was recovered and placed in the town hall, when it opened. The murals in the council chamber, which were painted by J. R. Brown in 1901, were intended to portray, firstly, the marriage of King Henry VII (of Lancaster) to Princess Elizabeth (of York) in 1486, secondly, the surrender of the Jacobite rebels at Battle of Preston in 1715, and thirdly, the last charge of King Richard III at Bosworth Field in 1485.

The town hall became the headquarters of Blackpool County Borough in 1904 and, after a major fire in the 1930s, it was rebuilt and extended to the south to create a new building, designed by John Charles Robinson. Following the completion of the works, King George VI and Queen Elizabeth visited the building in May 1938. The main frontage of the town hall was damaged by a bomb, planted by the Irish Republican Army, in August 1939. Four stained glass windows in the council chamber, representing education, light industry, agriculture & sport, and recreation, which had suffered damage in the fire, were replaced in the 1940s.

The Princess Royal made a visit to the town hall in 1958 and a weather vane in the shape of the galleon Golden Hind, which had been deemed unsafe, was removed from the roof of the building in February 1965.

The building became the headquarters of Lancashire borough of Blackpool in 1974 before becoming the headquarters of the new unitary authority, Blackpool Council, in 1998. A stained-glass window, which had been set into the ceiling in the council chamber, was restored in August 2019.
