= List of schools in Blackpool =

This is a list of schools in Blackpool, in the English county of Lancashire.

== State-funded schools ==
=== Primary schools ===
- Anchorsholme Primary Academy
- Armfield Academy
- Baines' Endowed CE Primary Academy
- Bispham Endowed CE Primary School
- Blackpool Gateway Academy
- Blackpool St John's CE Primary School
- Blackpool St Nicholas CE Primary School
- Boundary Primary School
- Christ the King RC Academy
- Devonshire Primary Academy
- Hawes Side Academy
- Holy Family RC Primary School
- Kincraig Primary School
- Layton Primary School
- Marton Primary Academy and Nursery
- Mereside Primary Academy
- Moor Park Primary School
- Norbreck Primary Academy
- Our Lady of the Assumption RC Primary School
- Revoe Learning Academy
- Roseacre Primary Academy
- St Bernadette's RC Primary School
- St Cuthbert's RC Academy
- St John Vianney's RC Primary School
- St Kentigern's RC Primary School
- St Teresa's RC Primary School
- Stanley Primary School
- Thames Primary Academy
- Unity Academy
- Waterloo Primary Academy
- Westcliff Primary Academy
- Westminster Primary Academy

=== Secondary schools ===
- Armfield Academy
- Blackpool Aspire Academy
- Highfield Leadership Academy
- Millfield Science and Performing Arts College
- Montgomery Academy
- St George's School
- St Mary's Catholic Academy
- South Shore Academy
- Unity Academy Blackpool

=== Special and alternative schools ===
- Educational Diversity
- Highfurlong School
- Lotus School
- Park Community Academy
- Woodlands School

=== Further education ===
- Blackpool and The Fylde College
- Blackpool Sixth Form College

== Independent schools ==
=== Special and alternative schools ===
- BFC School
- Lancashire Alternative Provision
- Spen Brook School
- Tower Learning Centre
