= Blackpool urban area =

Built-up area in Lancashire, England

Coordinates: 53.830°N 2.941°W

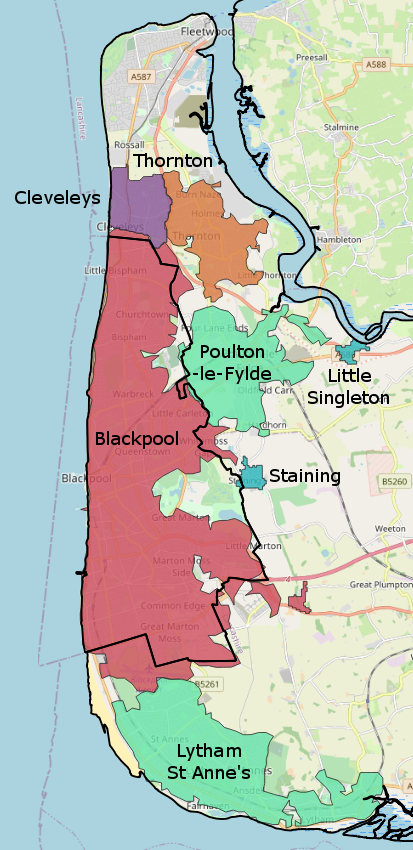
Map of the Blackpool Urban Area including subdivisions and local authority boundaries

The Blackpool Built-up Area or Blackpool Urban Area is an urban area in Lancashire, England, consisting of the town of Blackpool along with several surrounding towns and villages including Bispham, Cleveleys, Lytham St Annes, Poulton-le-Fylde and Thornton. Defined by the ONS it had a population of 239,409 in 2011 this is considerably down on the 2001 population of 261,088 mainly due to Fleetwood no longer being considered as part of the built-up area. The population of the Blackpool Urban Area has been declining for some time with the 2001 population down 0.1% from the 1991 figure of 261,355.

The Blackpool subdivision itself has a population of 147,633, although during the summer months the population of the town can rise to three times this figure. According to Lancashire Tourist Board there were 360,000 people living in the town during April and August 2003, the majority of these people working in Blackpool for the summer season.

The entirety of the Blackpool Urban Area lies within the FY postcode area. The code refers to the Fylde, making it one of only five postcode areas in the UK that does not reference one of its settlements (although its official name is the Blackpool postcode area).

The built up area is split over three local government districts: the Blackpool unitary authority area, the Borough of Fylde and the Borough of Wyre. The area has nine railway stations, and parts of it are served by the Blackpool Tramway. It is made up of the following subdivisions:

Urban subdivision	Population (2001 census)	Population (2011 census)	District
Blackpool	142,283	147,633	Blackpool
Fleetwood	26,841		Wyre
Lytham St Annes	41,327	42,953	Fylde
Thornton-Cleveleys	31,157		Wyre
Thornton		18,941	Wyre
Cleveleys		10,754	Wyre
Poulton-le-Fylde		17,430	Wyre
Staining		1,368	Fylde
Little Singleton		300	Fylde
Total Blackpool built-up area population	261,088	239,409	

Notes:

- Thornton-Cleveleys is split into the Thornton and Cleveleys subdivisions for the 2011 census.
- Fleetwood forms a separate built up area for the 2011 census.
- While almost all of the Blackpool subdivision falls within its own unitary authority area, some small regions, accounting for a population of around 8,000, do fall within the boroughs of Fylde (Blackpool Airport, Newton, Peel Hill) and Wyre (Norcross, Normoss). Similarly, the Mains area of the Poulton subdivision lies east of Main Dyke, and thus falls outside the Borough of Wyre (instead being in the Fylde district).
