= List of windmills in Lancashire =

A list of windmills in Lancashire, including those now within Greater Manchester and Merseyside.

== Locations ==
=== A – C ===
Location	Name of mill and grid reference	Type	Maps	First mention or built	Last mention or demise	Photograph
Ainsdale	Ainsdale Mill	Tower		c.1800	Closure in 1965 and demolition in late 1970s	
Aughton	Aughton Mill	Sunk Post				
Barton-upon-Irwell				1600	1600	
Bickerstaffe	Bickerstaffe Mill; SD 442 048	Tower		1756	Windmill World	
Billinge	Billinge Mill			1641	1691	
Birkdale	Birkdale Mill	Sunk Post		c.16th century	Mentioned 1845	
Boothstown				Mid-18th century	Demolished 1874	
Bretherton	Bank Mill; SD 462 208	Tower		1741	Windmill World	
Burscough	Mere Mill; SD 426 157	Tower			Windmill World	
Carleton	Dick's Mill	Tower			Demolished 1886	
Clifton	Clifton Mill; SD 464 313	Tower			Windmill World	
Cockerham					Burnt down 5 February 1802.	
Culcheth				1516	1593	

=== F – K ===
Location	Name of mill and grid reference	Type	Maps	First mention or built	Last mention or demise	Photograph
Freckleton		Smock Saw Mill				
Golborne				1352	1367	
Great Crosby	Moor Lane Mill; SD 329 003	Tower		1813	Windmill World	
Haigh	Brewery Mill; SD 605 089	Tower		1845	Windmill World	
Hambleton		Post		1870s	Demolished by 1934	
Ince				1558	1558	
Kirkham	Carr Hill Mill; SD 431 320	Tower			Windmill World	
Kirkham	Treales Mill; SD 447 328	Tower		Late 18th century	Windmill World	

=== L ===
Location	Name of mill and grid reference	Type	Maps	First mention or built	Last mention or demise	Photograph
Little Marton	Little Marton Mill; SD 349 342	Tower		1838	Windmill World	
Liverpool	Wavertree Mill	Midlands Post		1452	Demolished 1916	
Liverpool	Edge Hill Mill	Post		1642	1642	
Liverpool	Eastham Mill			1250	Destroyed May 1644	
Liverpool	Cathedral Mount					
Liverpool	Hale Mill	Post			Moved to Hale Bank, 1790	
Liverpool	Hale Bank Mill	Post		1790		
Liverpool	Townsend Mill			1348		
Liverpool	Townsend Mill	Midlands Post		1644	1772	
Liverpool	Gallows Mill	Tower		1825		
Liverpool	Gallows Mill (2nd mill)	Tower		1825		
Liverpool	Chisenhale Street	Tower		1814		
Liverpool	Chisenhale Street (2nd mill)	Tower		1814		
Liverpool	Preston Road Mill	Tower			Standing in 1936	
Liverpool	St James's Park	Tower		1773	Gone by 1889	
Liverpool	Stanley Park			1823		
Liverpool	Springfield Mill	Tower		1823	1907	
Liverpool	Parliament St (two)				Gone by 1889	
Liverpool	Bootle Lane				Burnt down 1834	
Longton					Standing 1916	
Lydiate	Forest's Mill; SD 380 039	Tower		1768	Windmill World	
Lytham St Annes	Lytham Mill; SD 371 271	Tower		1803	Windmill World	

=== M – P ===
Location	Name of mill and grid reference	Type	Maps	First mention or built	Last mention or demise	Photograph
Maghull					Standing in 1916	
Manchester	Deansgate			1771		
Manchester	Windmill Street			1766	1811	
Much Hoole					Standing in 1916	
Ormskirk	Wimbrick Mill				Standing in 1916	Photo
Parbold	Parbold Mill; SD 491 106	Tower		1810	Windmill World	
Pilling	Damside Windmill; SD 406 487	Tower		1808	Windmill World	
Preesall	Preesall Mill; SD 367 467	Tower		1839	Windmill World	
Prescot	Peck's Hill Mill				Burnt down 14 January 1839.	
Prescot	Acres Mill	Tower			Burnt down 9 August 1908	
Preston	Craggs Row Mill; SD 537 300	Tower		Early 19th century	Windmill World	
Preston	Park Lane Mill				Standing 1916	

=== R – W ===
Location	Name of mill and grid reference	Type	Maps	First mention or built	Last mention or demise	Photograph
Rimington	Stopper Lane Mill	Smock				
Rufford	Causeway End Mill	Tower			Standing in 1947	
Rufford		Midlands Post			Moved to Warton 1771	
Salford				1380	1380	
Singleton	Singleton Mill	Tower			Standing in 1947	
Southport		Titt iron wind engine		1894		
Staining	Staining Mill; SD 347 366	Tower		Late 18th century	Windmill World	
St Helens	Ravenhead Mill; SJ 502 942	Tower		Late 18th century	Windmill World	
Southport		Tower				Photo
Southport		Titt wind engine		1894		
Tarleton					Standing in 1916	
Thornton Cleveleys	Marsh Mill; SD 335 426	Tower		1794	Windmill World	
Toxteth	Scott's Mill; Wilson's Mill	Tower			Demolished c. 1960	
Treales	Treales	Tower			Windmill World	
Upholland	Holland Mill; SD 513 057	Tower		1768	Windmill World	
Warton	Warton Post Mill; SD 420 288	Sunk post (Midlands type)		1771	Windmill World	
West Derby				1229	1256	
West Derby	Acker's Mill			1717	1717	
Wrea Green	Wrea Green Mill; SD 395 313	Tower			Windmill World	
Wrightington	Harrock Hill Mill; SD 511 133	Tower			Windmill World	
Weeton	Weeton Mill; SD 393 346	Tower		1812	Demolished 1950s? Windmill World	

== Notes ==
Mills in bold text are still standing. Known building dates are also indicated in bold. Text in italics indicates that the information is not confirmed, but is likely to be the case.

== Sources ==
These sources will be useful to expand the article:-

- Clarke, Allen (1916). Windmill Land. London: J M Dent & Sons. ISBN 9780946571086.
- Clarke, Allen (1918). More Windmill Land. London: J M Dent & Sons.
- Clarke, Allen (1924). Windmill Land Stories. London: J M Dent & Sons.
