= Borough of Blackpool =

Unitary authority area in Lancashire, England

- Borough and unitary authority
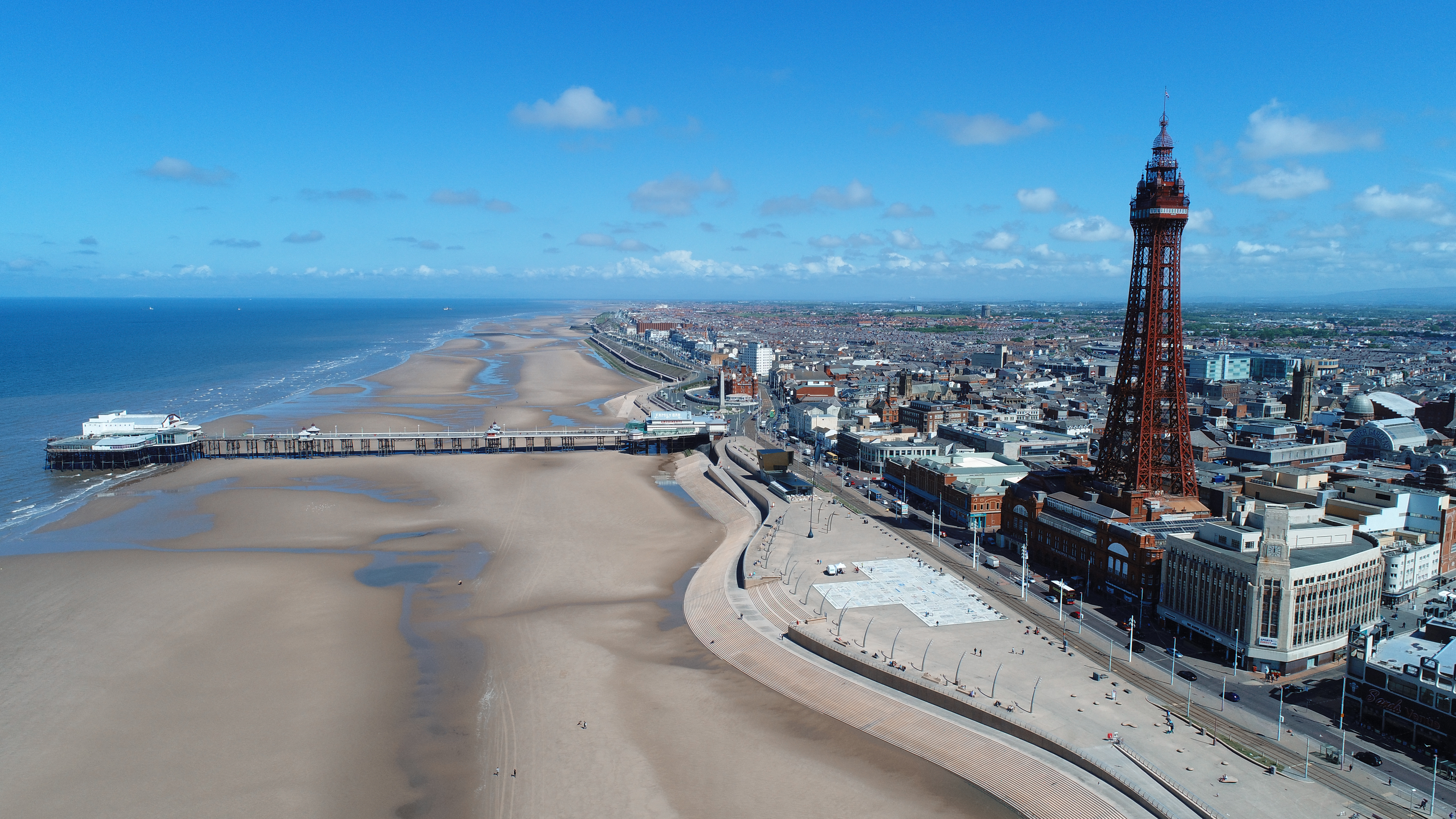
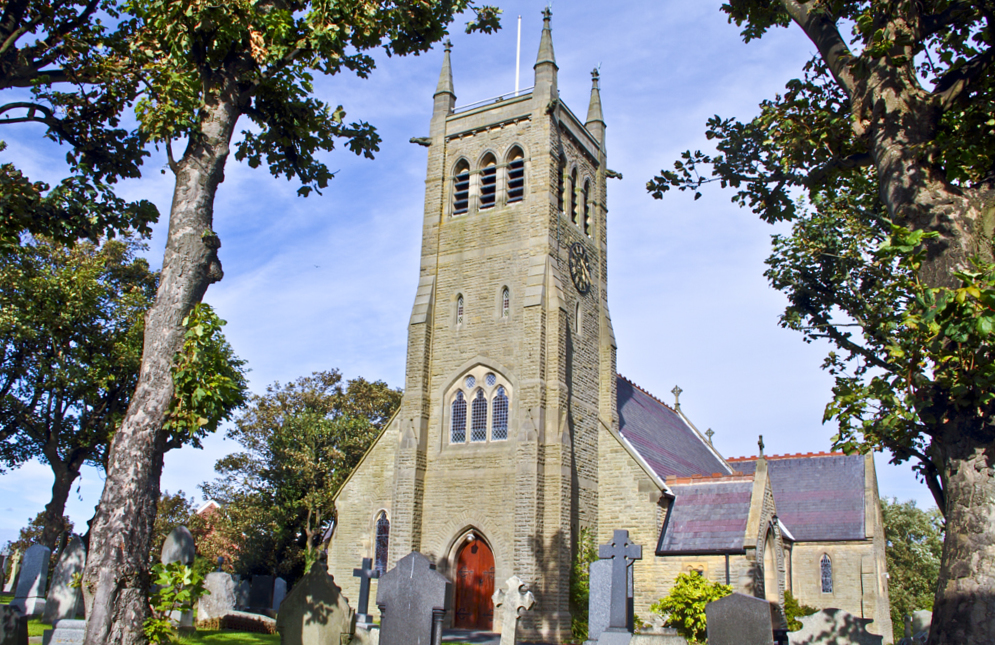
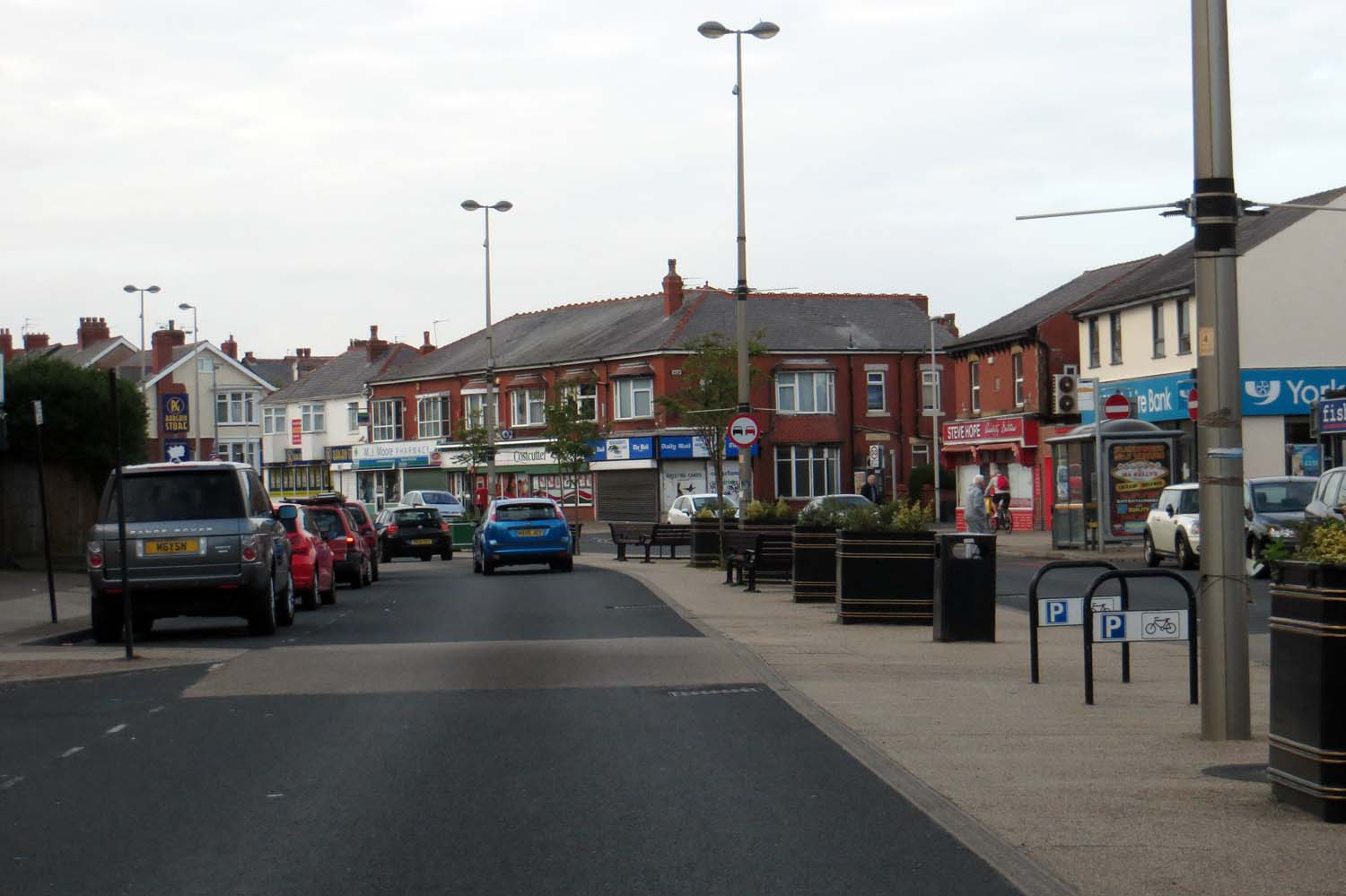
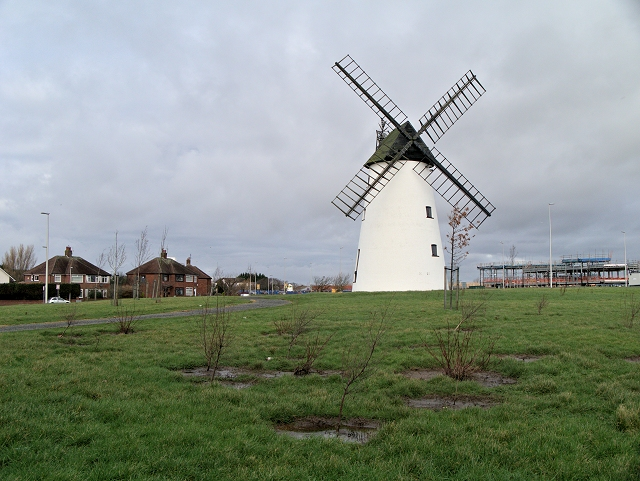
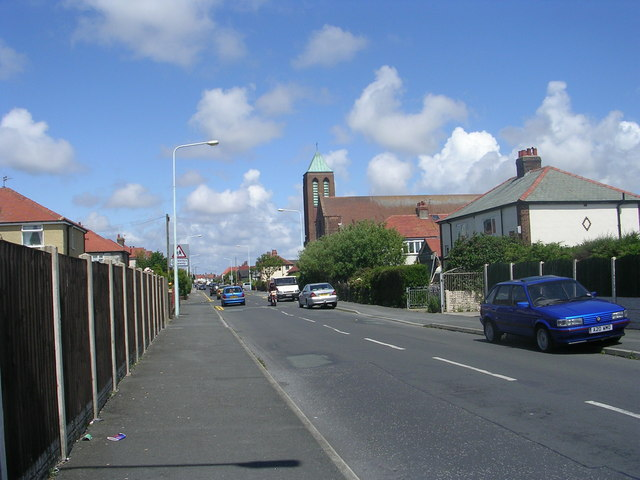
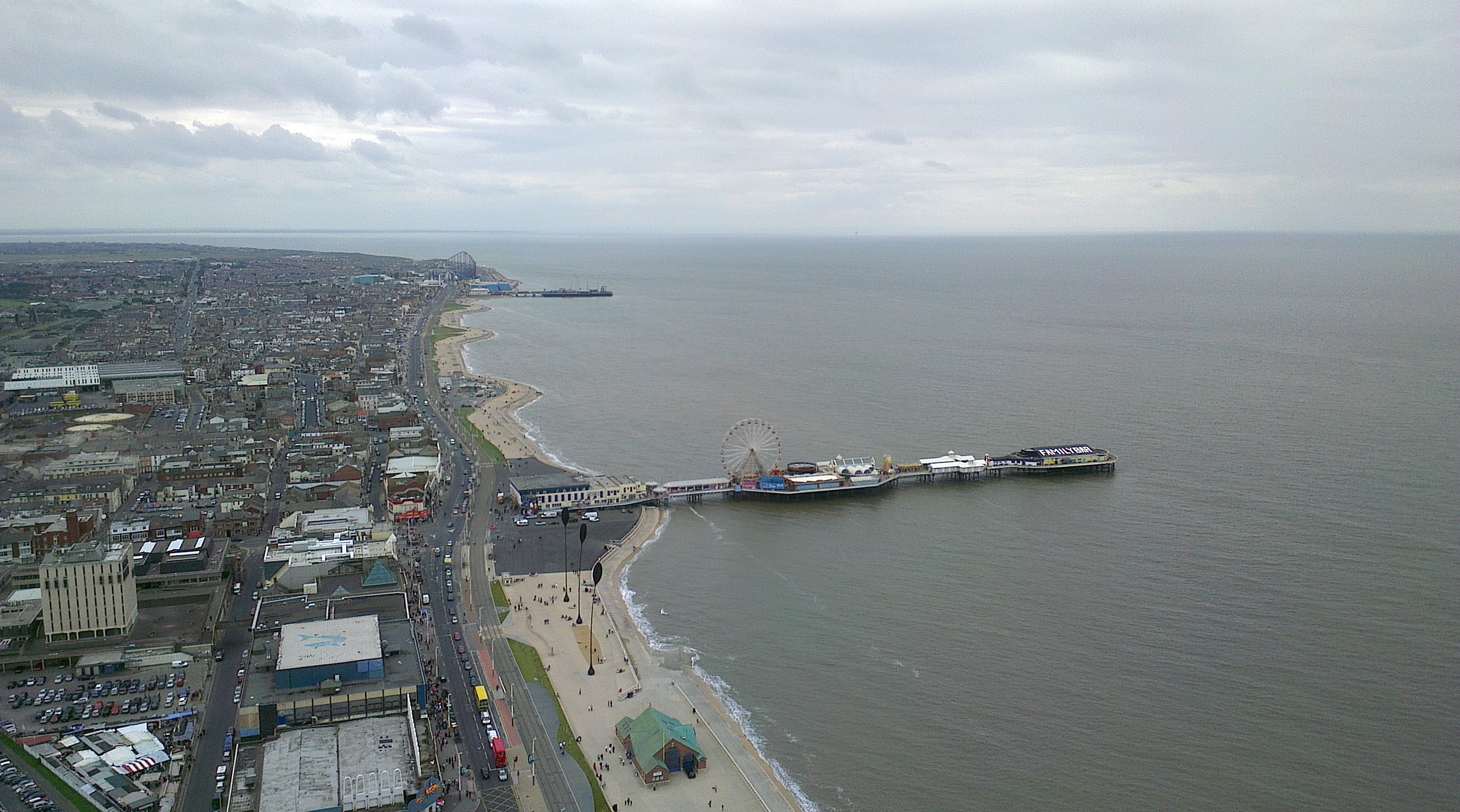
- From left to right: Top: Blackpool Tower and skyline; Middle 1st: Bispham Parish Church & Layton; Middle 2nd: Little Marton Mill & Anchorsholme; Lower: Aerial of Central Pier and surrounding suburbs

- Coat of arms
- Motto: Progress
- Blackpool shown within Lancashire
- Coordinates: 53.8208°N 3.0515°W
- Sovereign state: United Kingdom
- Country: England
- Region: North West
- Ceremonial county: Lancashire
- Incorporated: 1 April 1974
- Unitary authority: 1 April 1998
- Named after: Blackpool
- Administrative HQ: Blackpool Town Hall

Government
  - Type: Unitary authority
  - Body: Blackpool Council
  - Executive: Leader and cabinet
  - Control: Labour
  - Leader: Lynn Williams (L)
  - Mayor: Peter Hunter
  - MPs: Lorraine Beavers (L); Chris Webb (L)

Area
  - Total: 17 sq mi (43 km^{2})
  - Land: 14 sq mi (35 km^{2})
  - Rank: 272nd

Population (2024)
  - Total: 144,191
  - Rank: 162nd
  - Density: 10,710/sq mi (4,135/km^{2})

Ethnicity (2021)
  - Ethnic groups: List: 94.7% White; 2.6% Asian; 1.6% Mixed; 0.5% Black; 0.6% other

Religion (2021)
  - Religion: List: 50.8% Christianity; 41.0% no religion; 1.4% Islam; 0.4% Hinduism; 0.4% Buddhism; 0.2% Judaism; 0.1% Sikhism; 0.5% other; 5.3% not stated
- Time zone: UTC+0 (GMT)
  - Summer (DST): UTC+1 (BST)
- Postcode areas: FY
- Dialling codes: 01253
- ISO 3166 code: GB-BPL
- GSS code: E06000009
- Website: blackpool.gov.uk

The Borough of Blackpool is a unitary authority area with borough status in the ceremonial county of Lancashire, North West England. It is named after the seaside town of Blackpool but covers a wider area which includes Anchorsholme, Bispham, Layton, Marton and Squires Gate, as well as the suburbs of Grange Park, North Shore, South Shore and Starr Gate. The borough also forms the core of the wider Blackpool conurbation.

The borough is bordered to the north and north-east by the Borough of Wyre (including Fleetwood, Cleveleys, Thornton and Poulton-le-Fylde), and to the south and south-east by Borough of Fylde (including Lytham St Annes), both of which are non-metropolitan districts in Lancashire. The western boundary is the Irish Sea coast. Surrounding districts form part of the Blackpool Urban Area which covers all the unitary authority area.

== History ==
Blackpool was a municipal borough from 1876 until 1904 when it became a county borough; on 1 April 1974, under the Local Government Act 1972, the county borough of Blackpool was reconstituted as a non-metropolitan district with the same boundaries as the county borough. Until 1998, Blackpool was administered as part of Lancashire County Council which was based in Preston. After the creation of unitary authorities by the government, Blackpool and Blackburn were successful in gaining their own right to govern independent from the county council. Blackpool gained unitary authority status, as did Blackburn and it was renamed "Blackburn with Darwen". As of 2021 these are the only two unitary authorities in Lancashire although they remain part of Lancashire for ceremonial purposes.

== Localities in the borough ==
Places in Blackpool
- Anchorsholme
- Bispham
- Blackpool
- Bloomfield
- Brunswick
- Churchtown
- Claremont
- Common Edge
- Devonshire
- Grange Park
- Great Marton
- Great Marton Moss
- Great Marton Moss Side
- Greenhill
- Greenlands
- Hawes Side
- Highfurlong
- Hoohill
- Ingthorpe
- Layton
- Little Bispham
- Little Carleton
- Little Layton
- Little Marton Moss Side
- Little Norbreck
- Marton
- Marton Fold
- Mereside
- Moor Park
- Norbreck
- North Shore
- Queenstown
- Revoe
- South Shore
- Squires Gate
- Stanley Park
- Starr Gate
- Walker's Hill
- Warbreck
- Waterloo
- Whiteholme

== Government ==
Blackpool borough is administered by Blackpool Council currently under Labour control.
