= FY postcode area =

Postcode area within the United Kingdom

Blackpool
- Postcode area
- Location within the United Kingdom
- Coordinates: 53.827°N 3.021°W
- Sovereign state: United Kingdom
- Postcode area: FY
- Postcode area name: Blackpool
- Post towns: 5
- Postcode districts: 9
- Postcode sectors: 42
- Postcodes (live): 7,274
- Postcodes (total): 10,043
- Statistics as at May 2020

The FY postcode area, also known as the Blackpool postcode area, is a group of eight postcode districts in Lancashire, North West England. The districts cover the entire borough of Blackpool and the western parts of the boroughs of Wyre and Fylde. The letters in the postcode area name refer to the Fylde coastal plain. Its five post towns are Blackpool, Thornton-Cleveleys, Poulton-le-Fylde, Fleetwood and Lytham St Annes.

The FY1 district covers Blackpool town centre and areas immediately to the north and south. FY2 covers most of the town's northern areas, primarily Bispham. FY3 covers various suburbs east of the town centre, along with some rural areas east of the town including the village of Staining. FY4 covers the southern suburbs of Blackpool along with a small rural area to the south-east of the town. FY5 covers Thornton-Cleveleys and some of the northernmost Blackpool suburbs. FY6 covers the town of Poulton-le-Fylde and some rural areas to the east, as well as much of the Over Wyre region. FY7 covers the town of Fleetwood, and FY8 covers Lytham St Annes along with some small rural areas to the north and east.

Mail for the FY postcode area is processed at Preston Mail Centre, along with mail for the PR, BB and LA postcode areas.

== Coverage ==
The approximate coverage of the postcode districts:

Postcode district	Post town	Coverage	Local authority area(s)
FY0	BLACKPOOL		non-geographic
FY1	BLACKPOOL	Blackpool Town Centre, North Shore, South Shore	Blackpool
FY2	BLACKPOOL	Bispham, Moor Park	Blackpool
FY3	BLACKPOOL	Grange Park, Layton, Marton, Staining, Stanley Park	Blackpool, Fylde, Wyre
FY4	BLACKPOOL	Marton, Peel, South Shore, Squires Gate, Starr Gate	Blackpool, Fylde
FY5	THORNTON-CLEVELEYS	Anchorsholme, Little Bispham, Skippool, Thornton-Cleveleys	Wyre, Blackpool
FY6	POULTON-LE-FYLDE	Carleton, Hambleton, Knott End-on-Sea, Poulton-le-Fylde, Preesall, Singleton, Stalmine	Wyre, Fylde, Blackpool
FY7	FLEETWOOD	Fleetwood, Rossall	Wyre
FY8	LYTHAM ST. ANNES	Lytham St. Annes, Moss Side	Fylde

Some regions of the FY5 postcode area such as Little Bispham and Anchorsholme are generally considered to be suburbs of Blackpool due to being in that town's unitary authority area, despite having the Thornton-Cleveleys post town.

The same applies to a small section of the FY8 area adjacent to Blackpool Airport, which has the Lytham St Annes post town but is generally considered to be in Blackpool, including for the 2011 census.

== Map ==
FY postcode area map, showing postcode districts in red and post towns in grey text, with link to nearby PR postcode area.

== See also ==
- Postcode Address File
- List of postcode areas in the United Kingdom
