= Layton, Blackpool =

Coordinates: 53°49′16″N 3°01′40″W

Layton
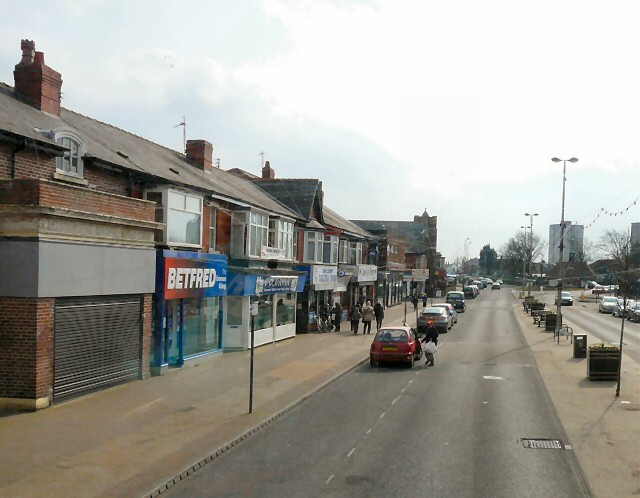
- Westcliffe Drive, Layton

- Location in Blackpool Location within Lancashire
- Population: 6,845 (2011 census)
- Unitary authority: Blackpool
- Ceremonial county: Lancashire
- Region: North West
- Country: England
- Sovereign state: United Kingdom
- Post town: BLACKPOOL
- Postcode district: FY3
- Dialling code: 01253
- Police: Lancashire
- Fire: Lancashire
- Ambulance: North West
- UK Parliament: Blackpool South

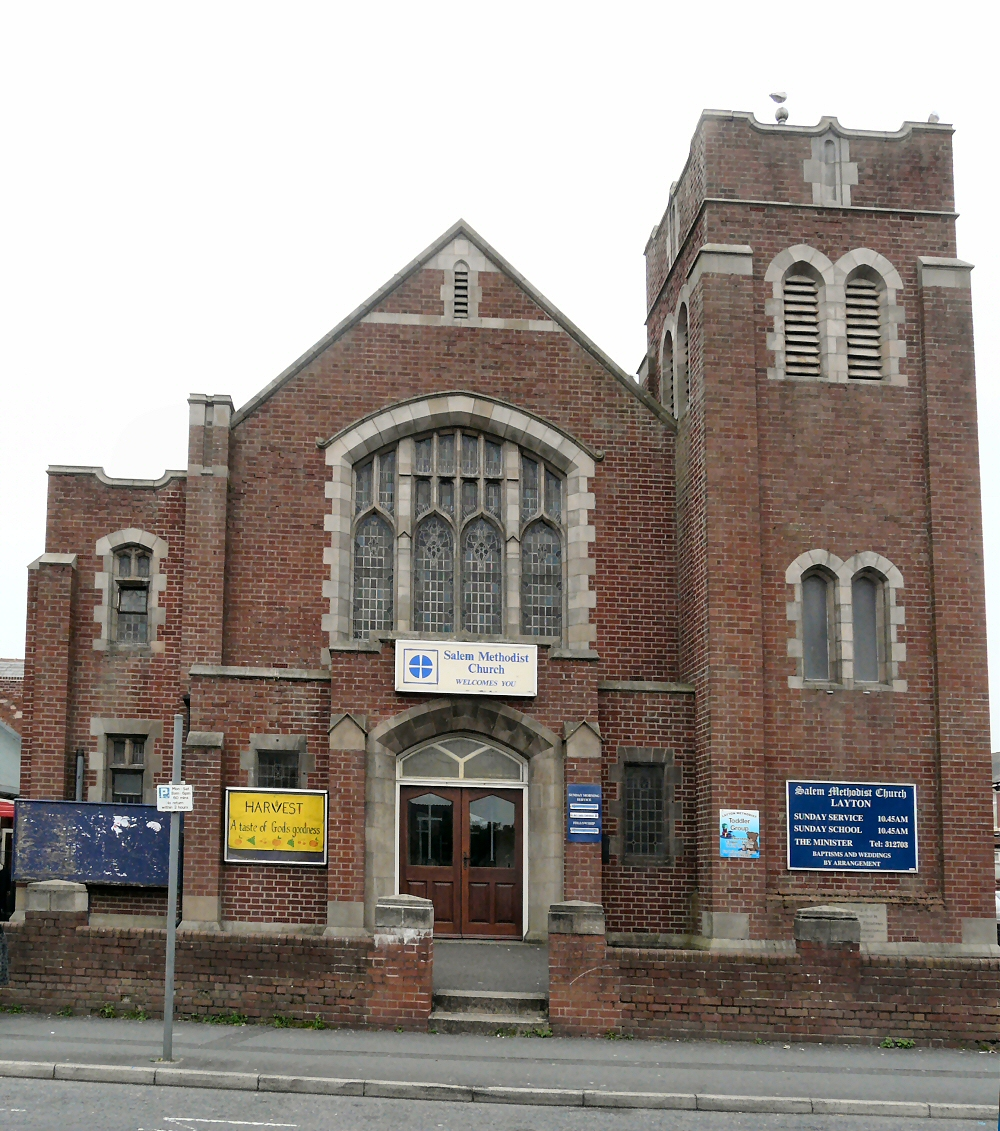
Salem Methodist Church, Layton

Layton is a suburb of Blackpool in the Borough of Blackpool in Lancashire, England. The ward population at the 2011 census was 6,845.

== Geography ==
Located roughly in Blackpool's geographical centre (although some distance from the coastal business district), Layton accounts for a relatively large part of the town's total area. Layton is bounded by the districts of Bispham (to the north), Whitegate (to the west), Grange Park (to the east) and Marton (to the south). Most of the land in this area is flat, apart from a single hill in the northeast corner.

== History ==
Layton with Warbreck was historically one of two townships in the parish of Bispham. The township included the nascent town of Blackpool within its boundaries, and in 1851 the township was made a Local Board of Health District. From 1866 the township also became a civil parish. The local board was renamed Blackpool in 1868 and the district was made a municipal borough in 1876. The name of the civil parish remained Layton with Warbreck until 1894 when it was renamed Blackpool.

== Facilities ==
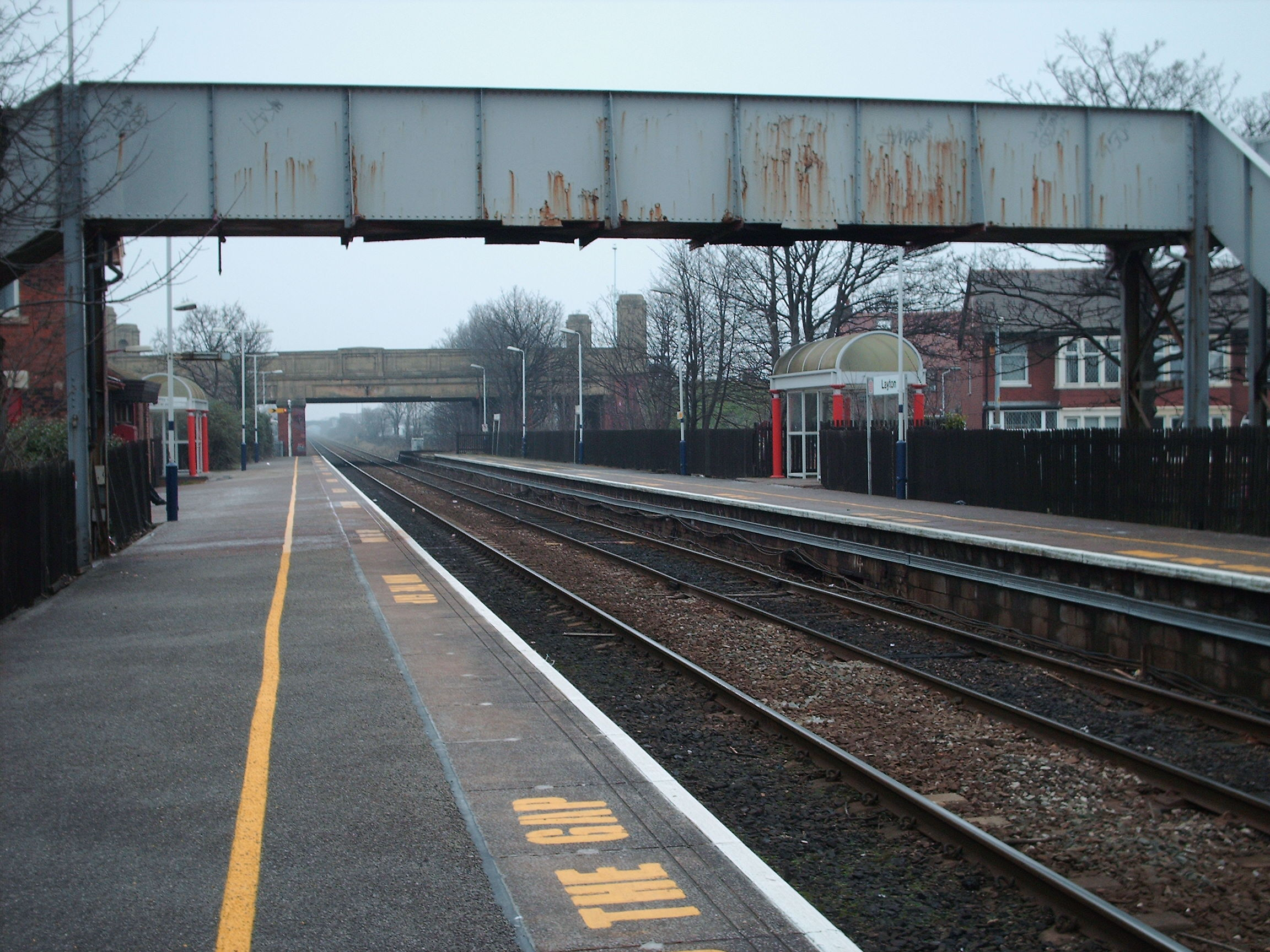
Layton railway station

The north of Layton has one of Blackpool's main concentrations of shops and other businesses outside the town centre. In this area, there is also a library and several churches and public houses. Layton also has several small parks and a number of bowling greens. The main fire station for Blackpool is at the south of the district. Kingscote Park is the second largest park in Blackpool, and the largest park within Layton itself. Layton Cemetery is the largest in the area. Established during the town's Victorian expansion, it has a small Judaic burial area.

Layton railway station (formerly Bispham railway station) in Bispham Road is on the line to Blackpool North.

== Education ==
Five schools are located within the district:

- St Mary's Catholic Academy
- Blackpool Aspire Academy
- Layton Primary School
- Devonshire Primary Academy, which has been rebuilt after the original building was destroyed by a fire.
- Christ the King RC primary school

== Transport ==
The area has 1 railway station with services run by Northern to Manchester Airport & Blackpool North.

The buses are run by Blackpool transport and Transpora on the following routes:

Number	Route	Operator	Via
5	Halfway house or Poulton	Blackpool Transport	Town Centre
5a	Halfway House or Staining	Blackpool Transport	Town Centre
5b	Halfway House or Zoo	Blackpool Transport	Town Centre
5c	Blackpool or Knott-end	Blackpool Transport	Poulton
6	Mereside or Grange Park	Blackpool Transport	Town Centre
7a	Cleveleys or Blackpool	Blackpool Transport	Bispham
11	Lytham or Blackpool	Blackpool Transport	St Annes
14	Fleetwood or Blackpool	Blackpool Transport	
24	Fleetwood or Blackpool	Transpora	Beechwood Drive, Arundel Drive
42	Blackpool or Lancaster	Stagecoach	Garstang
76	Blackpool or St Annes	Archway Travel	
x2	Poulton or Blackpool	Blackpool Transport	
