= Carleton elk =

The Carleton elk is the name given to a 12,000-year-old animal skeleton found in Carleton, Lancashire, England, in 1970. It provided the first evidence of humans living on The Fylde as far back as the Palaeolithic era. It is the earliest evidence of human habitation in Lancashire.

John Devine discovered the skeleton during demolition work on his bungalow, along with barbed arrowheads used by hunters. His neighbour, Tony Scholey, went to view the find and helped assemble the bones. Archaeologists excavated the bones, and the skeleton is now on display in the Harris Museum in Preston. It was nicknamed "Horace" by Scholey.

A Wetherspoons pub in nearby Poulton-le-Fylde is named the "Poulton Elk", referencing the find, despite the skeleton not being found in that town.

== See also ==
- Thornton Wolf
