= Wavertree Windmill =

Windmill in Liverpool, England

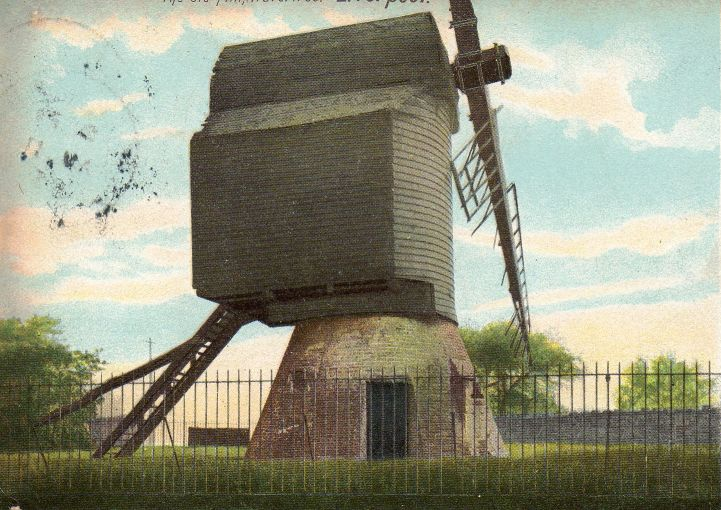
- The mill in 1905

Origin
- Mill location: Wavertree
- Coordinates: 53.3935°N 2.9125°W

Information
- Purpose: Corn mill
- Type: Post mill
- Roundhouse storeys: One
- No. of sails: Four
- Type of sails: Common sails
- Winding: Tailpole
- Year lost: 1916

Wavertree Mill was a fifteenth-century windmill which stood in Wavertree, Liverpool, England. As a post mill, the wooden superstructure could be rotated on its base to catch the wind, by means of a projecting pole attached to a cartwheel.

First recorded in 1452, the mill was the property of the crown until 1639, when Charles I granted it to James Stanley, then known as Lord Strange. By 1676, the mill was in the possession of James Stanley's grandson, William. The new owners retained the right of soke, meaning that their tenants were forbidden to have their corn ground at any other mill. In 1768, the ownership of the mill passed to Bamber Gascoyne of Childwall Hall. It was subsequently owned by the Marquess of Salisbury, and was finally leased by Colonel James Bourne.

One of the mill's sails was torn off during a gale in 1895, and subsequent damage had left it a wreck by the following year. The mill was demolished in 1916, despite local opposition.

In 1986, preparatory to the building of two new houses on the site, an archaeological dig was carried out, which unearthed the brick and stone foundations of the mill. These remains were dated to the eighteenth century, and are still visible in the front garden of one of the new houses, having been transplanted 15 yards (14 m) from their original location.

== See also ==
- List of windmills in Lancashire
