= Listed buildings in Staining, Lancashire =

Staining is a civil parish in the Borough of Fylde, Lancashire, England. It contains two buildings that are recorded in the National Heritage List for England as designated listed buildings, both of which are listed at Grade II. This grade is the lowest of the three gradings given to listed buildings and is applied to "buildings of national importance and special interest". The parish contains the village of Staining, and is otherwise mainly rural. The listed buildings consist of a farmhouse and a converted windmill.

== Buildings ==
Name and location	Photograph	Date	Notes
Stanley Cottage; 53.82276°N 2.99766°W	—	Late 17th century	A farmhouse in painted brick with a corrugated iron roof, it has 1 1/2 storeys and a three-bay front. At the left corner is a buttress and adjacent to it is a doorway. The windows on the front are sliding sashes, and there are blocked mullioned windows elsewhere.
Windmill; 53.82137°N 2.99265°W		18th century (probable)	The windmill has been converted for domestic use. It is in rendered brick and consists of a three-stage tapering circular tower, with a doorway and segmental-headed windows. At the top is a wooden boat-shaped cap, and an iron balcony.
