= Little Marton Mill =

Windmill in Marton in Lancashire, England

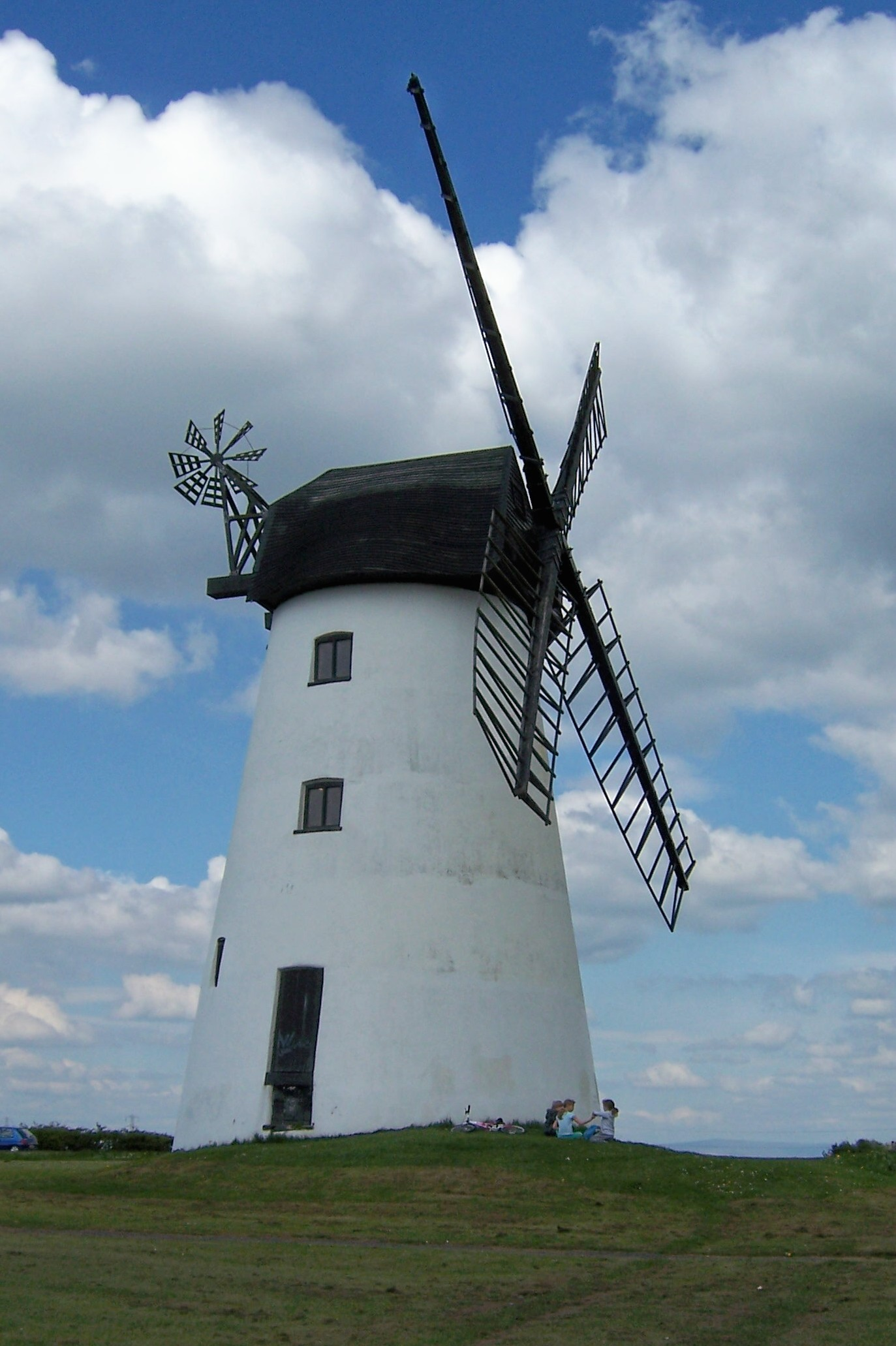

Origin
- Mill location: Blackpool, Lancashire, England
- Grid reference: SD 349,341
- Coordinates: 53°47′57″N 2°59′23″W
- Year built: 1838

Information
- Purpose: Corn mill
- Type: Tower mill
- Storeys: Four
- No. of sails: Four
- Fantail blades: Fifty
Listed Building – Grade II
Designated	20 October 1983
Reference no.	1205764

Little Marton Mill is a 19th-century English tower windmill in Marton, Blackpool, Lancashire, England. It was built in 1838 by John Hays for grinding corn, and worked until 1928. It has been designated a Grade II listed building by Historic England.

== History and assessment ==
Little Marton Mill was built in 1838 by millwright John Hays for John Whalley, on the site of a previous mill. It was once one of several gristmills in the area, and is the last remaining of perhaps four mills that once stood within the current boundaries of Blackpool. The hamlet of Little Marton was part of the township of Marton which, by the end of the 19th century, was incorporated into Blackpool and St Anne's-on-the-Sea. Marton had a watermill until the mid-18th century, and another wind-powered gristmill up to the late 19th century, both at Great Marton. Little Marton Mill was later worked by a miller named Cornelius Bagot. It stopped working in September 1928. Bagot restored the mill and in 1937 gave it to the Allen Clarke Memorial Fund as a memorial to local teacher, writer and windmill enthusiast C. Allen Clarke (1863–1935). The mill was extensively renovated in 1987 at a cost of £88,000. The mill is now open on Sundays to members of the public to visit and features demonstrations and information from volunteers about the milling process and its history.

Little Marton Mill is situated on a green, close to the M55 motorway and is a familiar landmark on this major route into the seaside resort. Historic England designated the windmill a Grade II listed building on 20 October 1983. The Grade II designation—the lowest of the three grades—is for buildings that are "nationally important and of special interest".

In April 2023, one of the mill's sails fell off and a second was loosened during high winds. Blackpool Council stated that a survey would be undertaken to assess the damage.

== Structure ==
Little Marton Mill is of a typical style for windmills built in the Fylde. On four storeys (including a basement), it has a circular plan and a broad base in proportion to its height. It is constructed of stuccoed, whitewashed brick. On the exterior wall there is a commemorative plaque to local writer Allen Clarke. The mill is entered through double doors (at basement level) to the east, and a single door to the west. There are square windows at the first, second and third storeys.

Typically for Fylde windmills, the cap (replaced in 1987) is boat-shaped. There are four sails and a fantail with eight blades. The machinery is incomplete, as some of it is now at Lytham Windmill.

== See also ==
- List of windmills in Lancashire
- Listed buildings in Blackpool
