= Unity Academy Blackpool =

Location
- Warbreck Hill Road; Blackpool, Lancashire, FY2 0TS; England; 53.8351°N 3.0367°W

Information
- Type: Academy
- Trust: Fylde Coast Academy Trust
- Department for Education URN: 139675 Tables
- Ofsted: Reports
- Principal: Chris Dew
- Gender: Mixed
- Age: 3 to 16
- Enrolment: 828
- Website: http://www.unity.blackpool.org.uk/

Unity Academy Blackpool is a mixed all-through school with academy status, located in the Warbreck area of Blackpool, Lancashire, England. It is situated on Warbreck Hill Road and is near Layton railway station. It educates pupils aged 3 to 16.

== History ==
The school was originally a single-sex boys institution named Warbreck High School. In 2000 it became co-educational and was renamed Beacon Hill School. Under the Building Schools for the Future programme in 2010 it was planned to merge with nearby Bispham High School, however this was cancelled and in March 2010 the school was renamed Unity College. The school converted to academy status on 1 September 2013, sponsored by the Fylde Coast Academy Trust.

=== Headteachers ===
- Chris Dew (current)
- John Connolly (acting)
- Stephen Cooke
- Christopher Lickiss
