= Westby-with-Plumptons =

Civil parish in Lancashire, England

Coordinates: 53.779°N 2.936°W

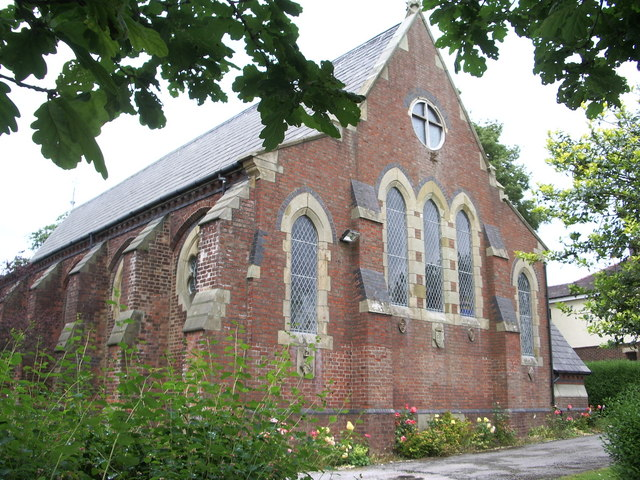
- St Anne's Church

- Shown within Fylde Borough Shown on the Fylde Location within Lancashire
- Population: 1,205 (2011 UK census)
- OS grid reference: SD384318
  - London: 196 miles (315 km)
- Civil parish: Westby-with-Plumptons
- District: Fylde
- Shire county: Lancashire
- Region: North West
- Country: England
- Sovereign state: United Kingdom
- Post town: PRESTON
- Postcode district: PR4
- Post town: BLACKPOOL
- Postcode district: FY4
- Post town: LYTHAM ST ANNES
- Postcode district: FY8
- Dialling code: 01772; 01253
- Police: Lancashire
- Fire: Lancashire
- Ambulance: North West
- UK Parliament: Fylde

Westby-with-Plumptons is a civil parish in Lancashire, England. The parish is in Fylde district and contains the hamlets of Great Plumpton, Little Plumpton, Lower Ballam, Higher Ballam, Moss Side, Peel, and Westby. At the 2011 census, the parish had a population of 1,205. Westby and Plumpton are mentioned in the Domesday Book, as "Westbi" and "Pluntun".

Westby-with-Plumptons is part of the Warton and Westby ward, represented by three councillors on Fylde Borough Council. On Lancashire County Council it is part of Fylde West ward, which elects one councillor.

The parish is generally low-lying, with arable land in the south and pasture in the north, which rises to 100 feet (30 m) above sea level at Great Plumpton in the north-east of the parish.

The parish is now the home of the steel farm-building construction company J. Wareing & Son (Wrea Green) Ltd. which was for many years based in the neighbouring village of Wrea Green.

== Moss Side ==
Moss Side (Grid Reference SD379302) is located in the south of the parish in between Wrea Green and Lytham with the B5259 road (Lytham Road) being the main road running through the hamlet.

The hamlet has several farms, smallholdings and a lodge park most of which are on Lytham Road.

The railway from Preston to Blackpool South runs through the hamlet with Moss Side railway station being located where the railway crosses Lytham Road at a level crossing. The station first opened in 1846, closed in 1961 and was re-opened in 1983. The station in the past had a stationmaster's house and signal box, both of which have been demolished. It is also close to where the Moss Side rail crash occurred in 1924 which claimed the lives of 14 people.

Moss Side used to have a hospital which opened in 1902 as the Fylde Isolation Hospital (later known as Moss Side Hospital) for people with infectious diseases. The hospital closed in 1988 due to being surplus to requirements as well as changes in medical practice and was demolished to make way for new houses.

There was also a small Wesleyan chapel on Lytham Road during the early 20th Century.

== Peel ==
Peel is a small settlement on the outskirts of Blackpool, featuring Whitehills Business Park which includes several car dealerships, a B&Q store and a Premier Inn. A business park has increased in size over the years to include a variety of small businesses from lawnmower repairs, a print and design company and BMW servicing to larger concerns such as a renewable energy company and building merchants. Local theatrical group Junction 4 Productions has its home here and Penny Farm run by World Horse Welfare is also nearby. Further afield, there are several caravan parks (Pipers Height and Clifton Fields Caravan Park) situated on Peel Road.

Junction 4 of the M55 motorway is located at Peel and on the boundary between Blackpool and Fylde Borough.

== Ballam ==
Ballam is a small hamlet in between Moss Side, Peel and Lytham, consisting of a small number of dwellings, a few farms and a small church which was previously the village school.

Coppice Business Park was recently built at the back of Ballam and is now home to several local businesses.

== Westby ==
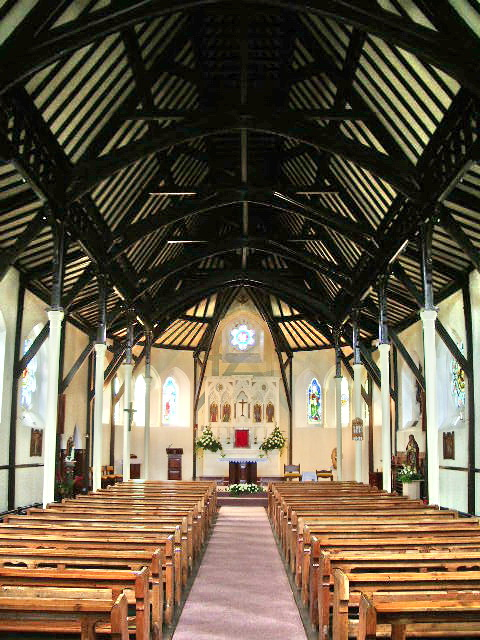
Interior of St. Anne's Church

Westby is another small hamlet, towards the north of the parish, located in between Wrea Green and Ballam, just south of Preston New Road. The hamlet is notable for the Catholic church of St. Anne's, designed by E. W. Pugin and built in 1860. The exterior is plain, in contrast to the highly-decorated interior which has an elaborate timber roof. There are two important stained glass windows, a "St Cecilia" and the "Millennium" window.

== Fracking at Little Plumpton ==
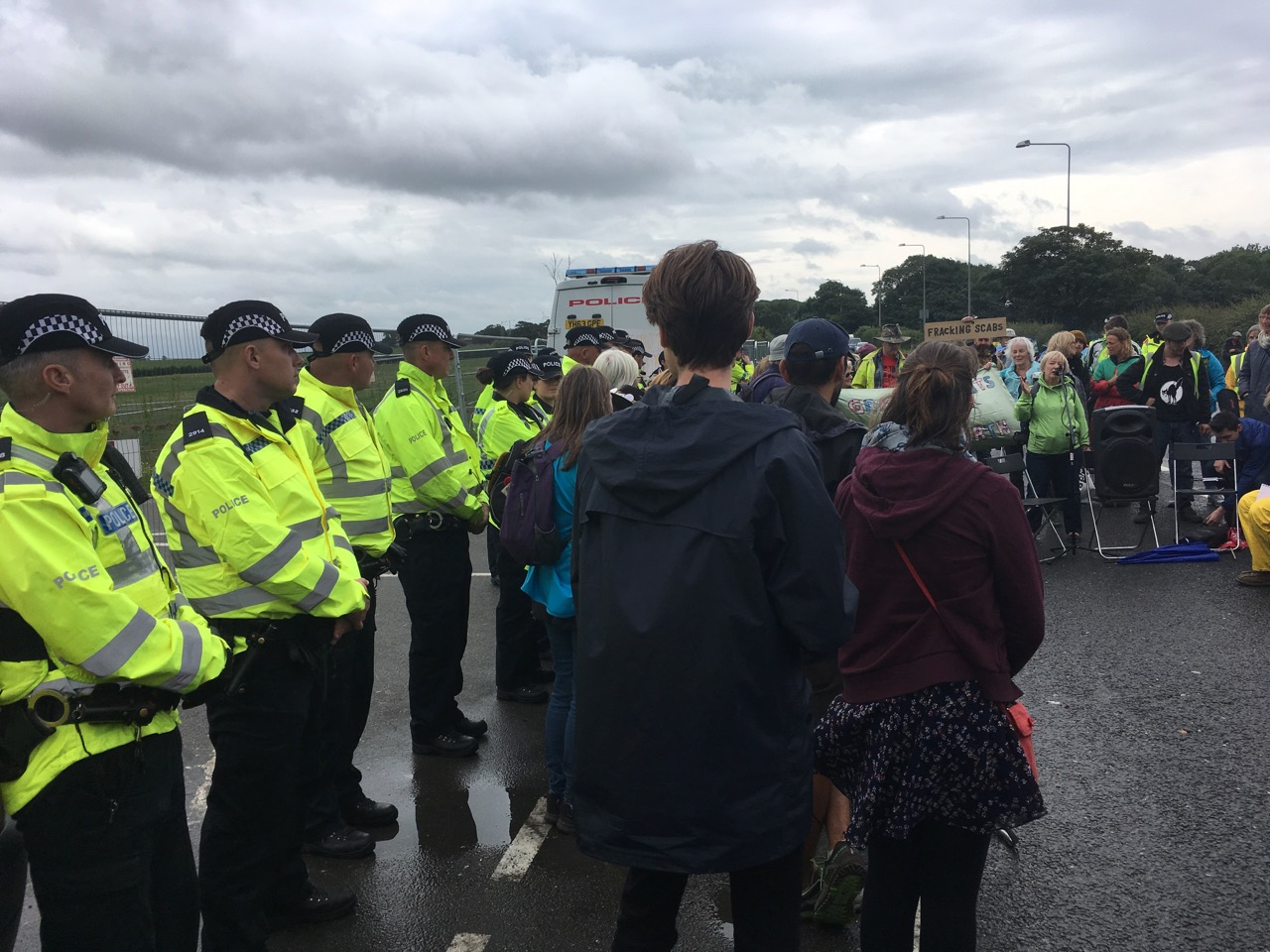
Protestors in July 2017

Cuadrilla Resources undertook its first, and to date, only, high-volume hydraulic fracturing job near Westby in 2011. Cuadrilla halted operations in May 2011 at the site due to seismic activity damaging the casing in the production zone.

In June 2015, Lancashire County Council turned down an application by Cuadrilla to extract shale gas by means of fracking at a site at Little Plumpton. This was overturned on appeal in 2016 and the council's own appeal to the Court of Appeal was lost in January 2018.

In November 2017 Cuadrilla, in agreement with the government, financially compensated the local community for the disruption. A community fund of £100,000 was created, and additionally households within 1 km will receive about £2,070 and others within 1.5 kilometres will receive about £150. The cost of Lancashire Constabulary policing the site, since January 2017, was estimated to have been between £6m and £8m.

== See also ==
- Listed buildings in Westby-with-Plumptons
