= Starr Gate =

Coordinates: 53.777222°N 3.055°W

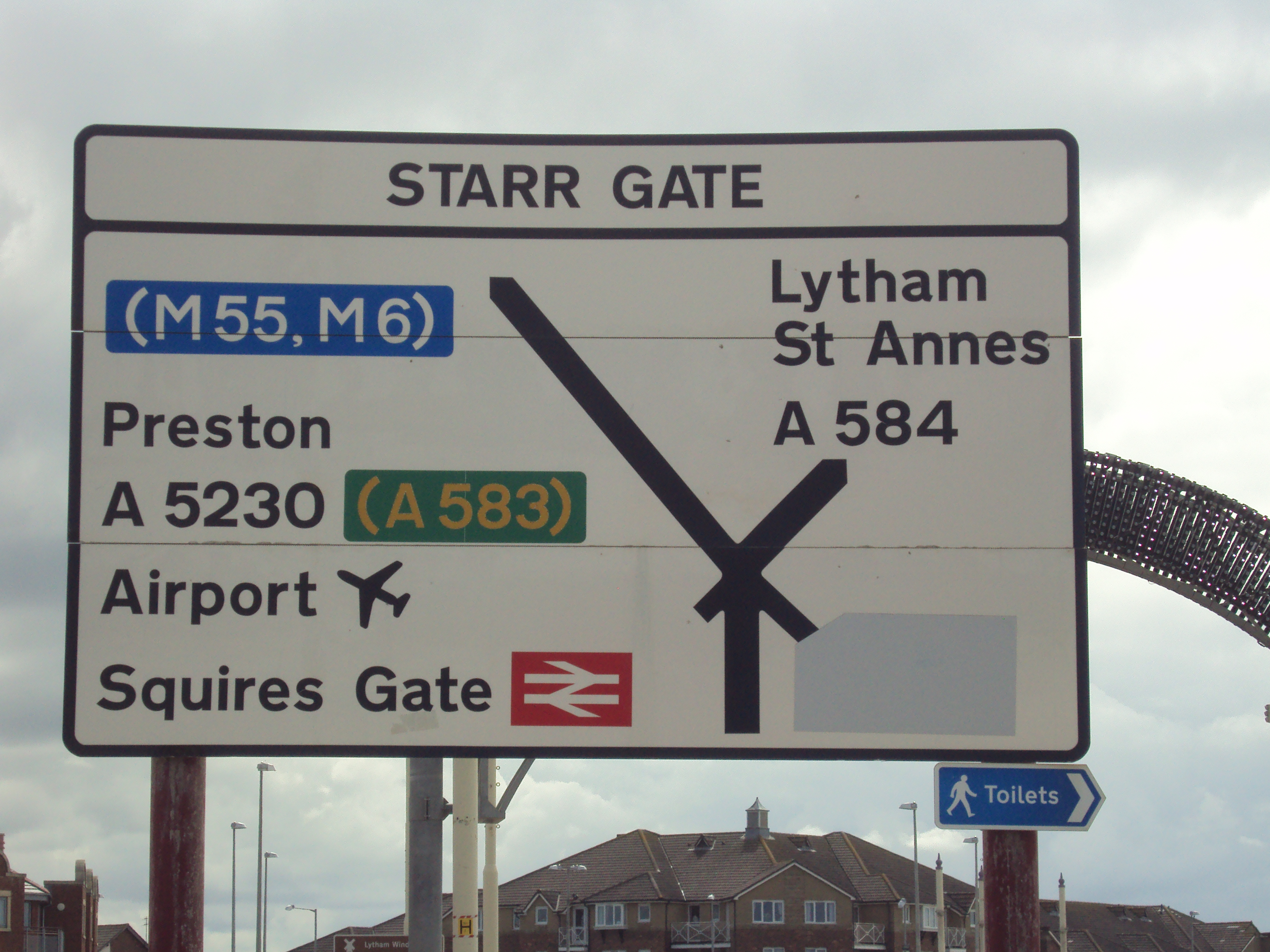
- Road sign for Starr Gate on the A584

- Location in Blackpool Location within Lancashire
- Unitary authority: Blackpool
- Ceremonial county: Lancashire
- Region: North West
- Country: England
- Sovereign state: United Kingdom
- Post town: BLACKPOOL
- Postcode district: FY4
- Police: Lancashire
- Fire: Lancashire
- Ambulance: North West
- UK Parliament: Blackpool South

Starr Gate is a suburb in the South Shore district of Blackpool in the county of Lancashire, England. It is located at the southwest end of Blackpool on the Fylde coast, adjacent to the Squires Gate district of Blackpool.

The place is named after the spiky "Starr" grass which grows on the local sand hills to the south of Starr Gate. "Gate" (Geat in Old English) means "Way", taken from the Old Norse Gat - an opening or passage.

== Transport ==
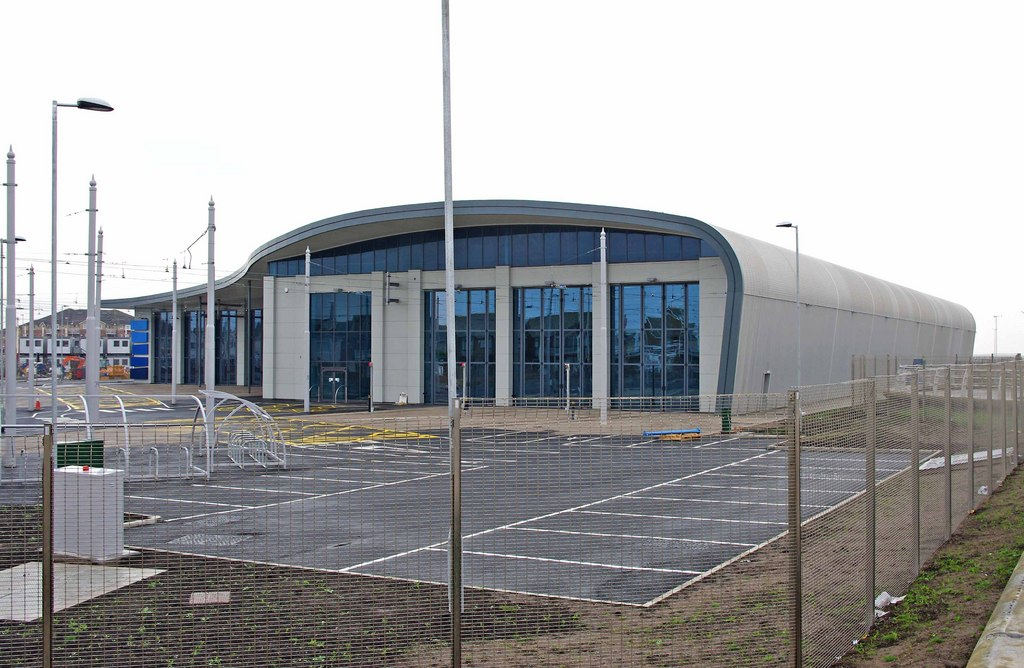
Starr Gate tram depot (2011)

Starr Gate is served by Squires Gate railway station on the Blackpool to Preston line. The southern terminal loop of the Blackpool Tramway is located at Starr Gate, along with the Starr Gate tram depot from which trams run up the coast into central Blackpool and to Fleetwood.

Starr Gate is also immediately adjacent to Blackpool International Airport.

From May to September 1973, a hovercraft provided a transport service from the tram terminus to Southport. In 2005 there were hopes of reviving the service.
