= North Shore, Blackpool =

Coordinates: 53°50′07″N 3°03′08″W

North Shore
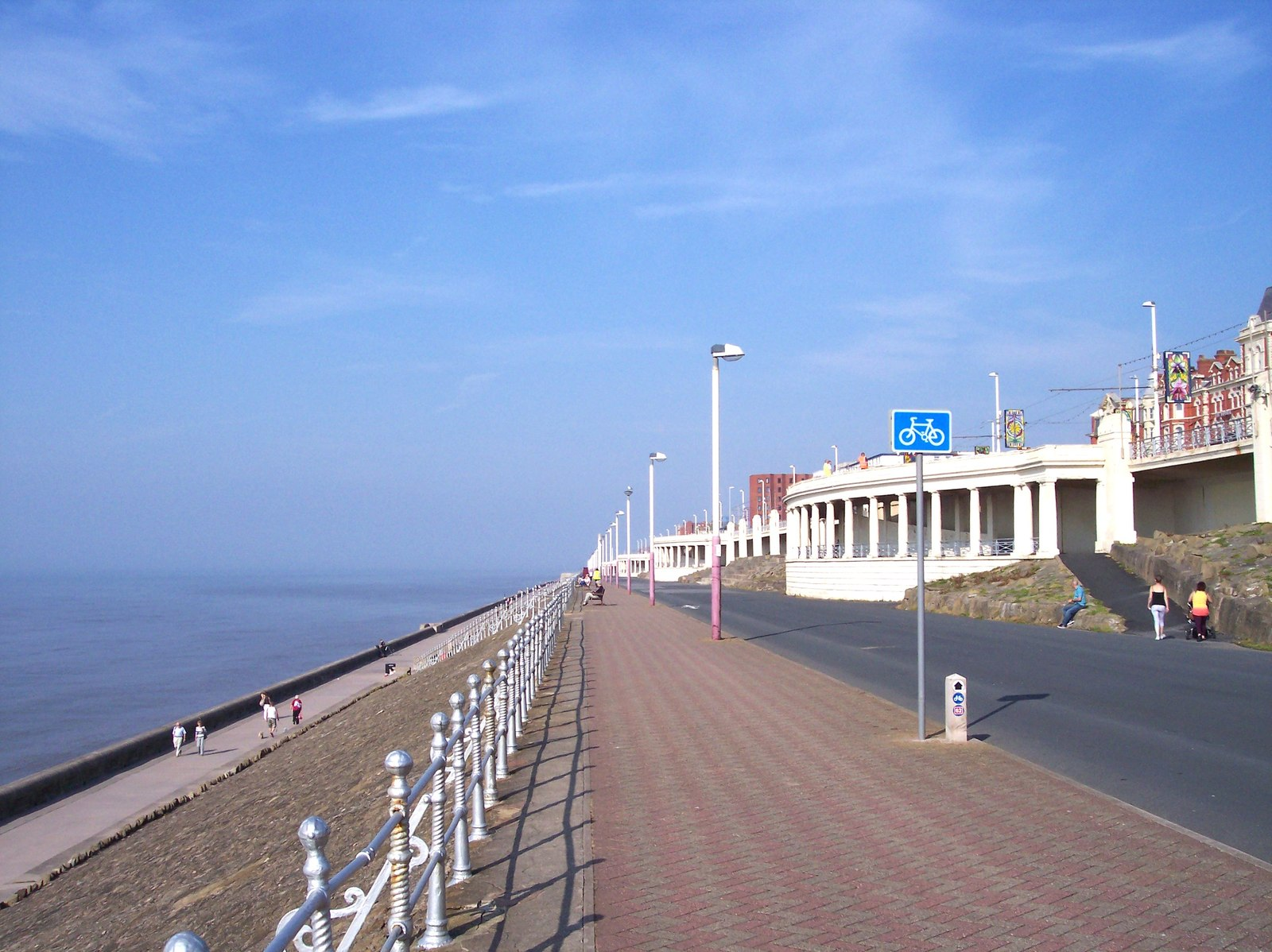
- North Shore Promenade, Blackpool

- Location in Blackpool Location within Lancashire
- Unitary authority: Blackpool
- Ceremonial county: Lancashire
- Region: North West
- Country: England
- Sovereign state: United Kingdom
- Post town: BLACKPOOL
- Postcode district: FY2
- Dialling code: 01253
- Police: Lancashire
- Fire: Lancashire
- Ambulance: North West
- UK Parliament: Blackpool South

North Shore is an inner-suburb of Blackpool in the Borough of Blackpool, Lancashire, England. It forms the northern part of both the town and is situated along Queen's Promenade between Blackpool and Bispham.

== History ==
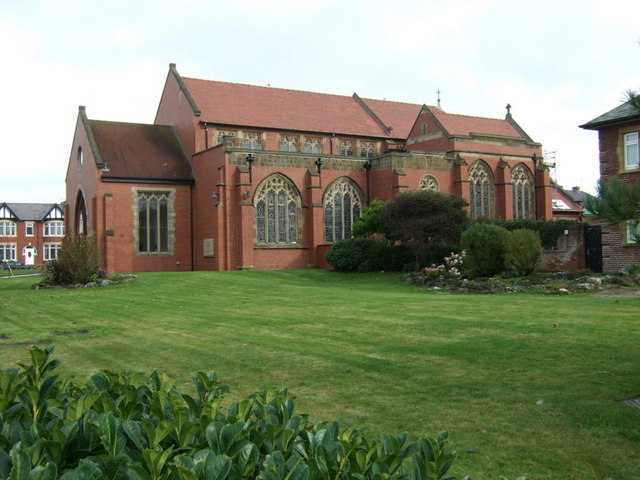
St Stephen's Church, North Shore

North Shore was the location of Blackpool's first amusement arcade known as Uncle Tom's Cabin. From there, Blackpool's Claremont Park estate was constructed with three seafront promenades being erected with several hotels, including the Imperial Hotel, Blackpool being constructed to serve it. The north promenade was constructed specifically so that the gentry could view the seafront separated from the working classes. The popular Blackpool Illuminations start at North Shore along with the majority of Blackpool's tourist attractions such as the North Pier. The Civil Service had a placement in North Shore at Mexford House, which was constructed in the 1970s and housed regional units from the Department for Work and Pensions and the Inland Revenue. It closed in 2009 and was redeveloped into housing in 2019.

In 1907, North Shore Methodist Church was constructed specifically to serve the Christian worship needs of holiday makers in Blackpool with a Sunday school being opened a year later. The church was granted grade II listed status in 1998 however in 2018, it closed to public worship due to a lack of attendance as none of the congregation who attended regularly lived within the local parish. The only church serving the area is now St Stephen-on-the-Cliffs Church which is located on Holmfield Road and is an active place of worship and community hub.

== See also ==
- Gynn Square
