= Anchorsholme =

Coordinates: 53.87°N 03.03°W

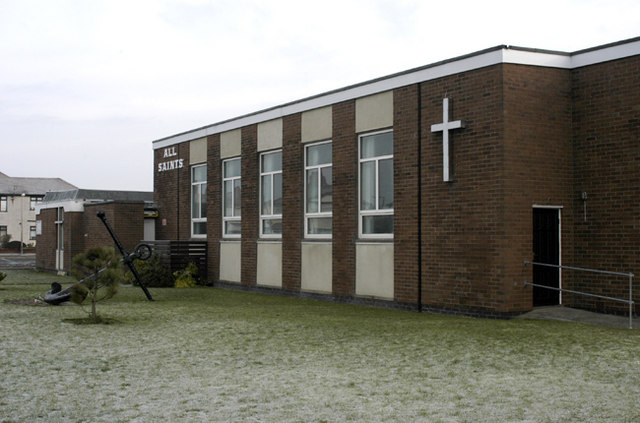
- All Saints parish church

- Location in Blackpool Location within Lancashire
- Population: 6,195 (2021 censusWard)
- OS grid reference: SD3242
- Unitary authority: Blackpool
- Ceremonial county: Lancashire
- Region: North West
- Country: England
- Sovereign state: United Kingdom
- Post town: THORNTON-CLEVELEYS
- Postcode district: FY5
- Dialling code: 01253
- Police: Lancashire
- Fire: Lancashire
- Ambulance: North West
- UK Parliament: Blackpool North and Fleetwood

Anchorsholme is a suburban area of Blackpool and the name of a ward in the Borough of Blackpool in Lancashire, England. It lies close to the town of Cleveleys.

== Toponymy ==
The name Anchorsholme is thought to derive from the Old Scandinavian word 'holmr' meaning a piece of dry ground in a marsh forming an island, with the 'Anchors' meaning a location where one would fasten up a boat.

== Promenade and coastal defences ==
The promenade and sea wall at Anchorsholme were rebuilt in 2017 as part of the Anchorsholme Coast Protection Scheme. In addition, the level of the coast road, Princes Way, was raised to help lessen flooding.The promenade is on two levels and replaced damaged flood defences and a single-level promenade constructed in the 1930s. In 2025, further work to strengthen the sea defences is scheduled. Rocks are to be laid against the existing concrete sea wall slope and rock groynes built to trap sand, raise the level of the beach and reduce the strength of the waves reaching the revetment.

== Parks and open spaces ==
Anchorsholme Park lies near the seafront. It was reopened on 20 July 2020 after being closed for five years due to the construction of a below ground water storage tank and pump for United Utilities. The project is designed to lessen stormwater discharges into the sea and improve water bathing quality to comply with a tougher European Bathing Water Directive. The reinstated park includes a café, entertainment area, tennis courts and children's play area.

East Pines Park off Luton Road has a children's play area and gardens.

== School ==
Anchorsholme Primary School on East Pines Drive, since renamed Anchorsholme Academy, was opened in 1967.

== Council ==
It has two Conservative councillors, Councillor Tony Williams and Councillor Michael Jebson who were elected in 2007 local elections. Councillor Tony Williams is the first representative from Anchorsholme to be appointed to a cabinet position on Blackpool Council. In the 2011 local elections, Councillor Michael Jebson was replaced by Conservative Councillor Paul Galley in 2011. Both Councillors retained their seats in 2015. Cllr. Tony Williams became Leader of the Conservative Group on Blackpool Council in 2014.

== Sports ==
Anchorsholme has two sports team. Anchorsholme Football Club compete in the Mid Lancashire Football League Premier Division and Anchorsholme Cricket Club compete in the Fylde Cricket League.

== Notable people ==
John Robb, pop music journalist, author and rock musician, grew up in Anchorsholme.
