= Listed buildings in Westby-with-Plumptons =

Westby-with-Plumptons is a civil parish in the Borough of Fylde, Lancashire, England. It contains five buildings that are recorded in the National Heritage List for England as designated listed buildings, all of which are listed at Grade II. This grade is the lowest of the three gradings given to listed buildings and is applied to "buildings of national importance and special interest". Apart from small villages, the parish is rural. The listed buildings consist of a former farmhouse, a former barn, a cottage, a church, and the base of a wayside cross.

== Buildings ==
Name and location	Photograph	Date	Notes
Barn, Westby House; 53.77919°N 2.93638°W	—	17th century	Originally a barn or workshop, and later used as a garage, it is brick with a thatched roof. It has a rectangular plan with three small bays, there is a dormer in the eaves, and modern garage doors in the centre.
White House; 53.77204°N 2.96326°W	—	1701	A former farmhouse in painted brick with a slate roof. It has two storeys and four bays. On the front is a gabled porch. All the windows have been replaced with modern casements. Inside is an inglenook and a bressumer.
Willow Cottage; 53.78030°N 2.92525°W	—	18th century	The cottage is in rendered brick with a thatched roof. It has two storeys and two bays with a single-storey extension to the left. On the front is a porch, and the windows are casements.
St Anne's Church; 53.78773°N 2.92457°W		1861	The Roman Catholic church was designed by E. W. Pugin in Gothic style. It is built in red brick with dressings in sandstone and blue brick, and with a slate roof. The church consists of a nave and aisles in one vessel, an apsidal sanctuary, and an east porch.
Fox Lane Ends Cross; 53.78097°N 2.92078°W		Undated	The original part is the base of a wayside cross, which consists of a square shaped boulder. A modern stone cross was erected on it in 1922.
