= Sheila Quinn =

British nurse

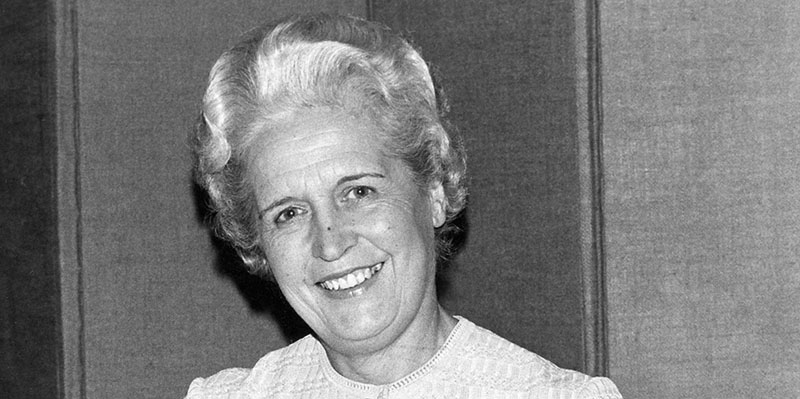

Dame Sheila Margaret Imelda Quinn, DBE, FRCN, RGN, RM, RNT (16 September 1920–8 December 2016), was a British nurse and fellow of the Royal College of Nursing. She was president of the Royal College of Nursing (RCN) from 1982 to 1986. She was awarded an RCN Fellowship (FRCN) in 1978.

== Early life and education ==
Born in Blackpool, England, on 16 September 1920, she was educated at the Convent of the Holy Child, Jesus (Layton Hill Convent, Blackpool), now known as St Mary's Catholic High School (Blackpool). Quinn trained as a State Registered Nurse at the Royal Lancaster Infirmary between 1943 and 1946.

== International work and honours ==
From 1961 to 1970, Quinn served on the administrative staff of the International Council of Nurses (ICN), of which she was executive director from 1967 to 1970. She was an ICN representative to the International Labour Organization.

She also acted as a consultant to the World Health Organization. Throughout her career, she was chief nursing officer (CNO) to the Southampton University Hospitals NHS Trust, regional nursing officer (RNO) for the Wessex Regional Health Authority, and chief nursing advisor for the British Red Cross.

She was appointed Commander of the Most Excellent Order of the British Empire (CBE) and later elevated to Dame Commander (DBE) by Queen Elizabeth II. In 1993, the ICN awarded her the Christiane Reimann Prize, which is given every four years for outstanding contribution to the profession. Dame Sheila contributed significantly to the Problem Solving for Better Health (PSBH) program at the Dreyfus Health Foundation (DHF) since 1995.

She helped found The Brendoncare Foundation for Total Care of the Elderly in the mid-1980s.

== Death ==
She died on 8 December 2016, at the age of 96 at Southampton General Hospital.
