= Marton Mere Local Nature Reserve =

Lake and nature reserve in Blackpool, Lancashire, England

Marton Mere
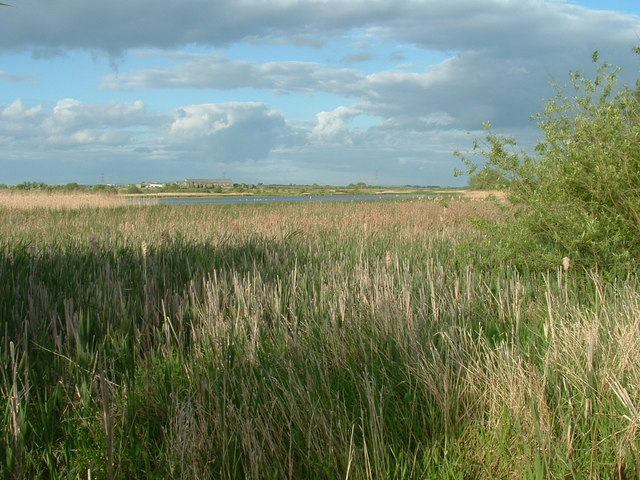
- Marton Mere

- Location in Blackpool Location in Lancashire
- Location: Lancashire, England
- Coordinates: 53.8094°N 2.9998°W
- Type: mere

Marton Mere is a mere (lake) and Local Nature Reserve in Blackpool, Lancashire, England. It is located near to the Blackpool districts of Marton and Mereside and the village of Staining. It is a Site of Special Scientific Interest. It supports various habitats such as open water, reed beds, grassland as well as pockets of woodland and scrub.

The mere is a glacial freshwater lake. Originally approximately 3 miles (4.8 km) long and 1 mile (1.6 km) wide, the lake was gradually drained throughout the 18th century to allow land to be reclaimed for agriculture. It was drained further when Main Dyke was cut around 1850.

The reserve is adjacent to Marton Mere Holiday Village.
