= Carleton, Lancashire =

Village in Lancashire, England

Coordinates: 53.854°N 3.006°W

Carleton
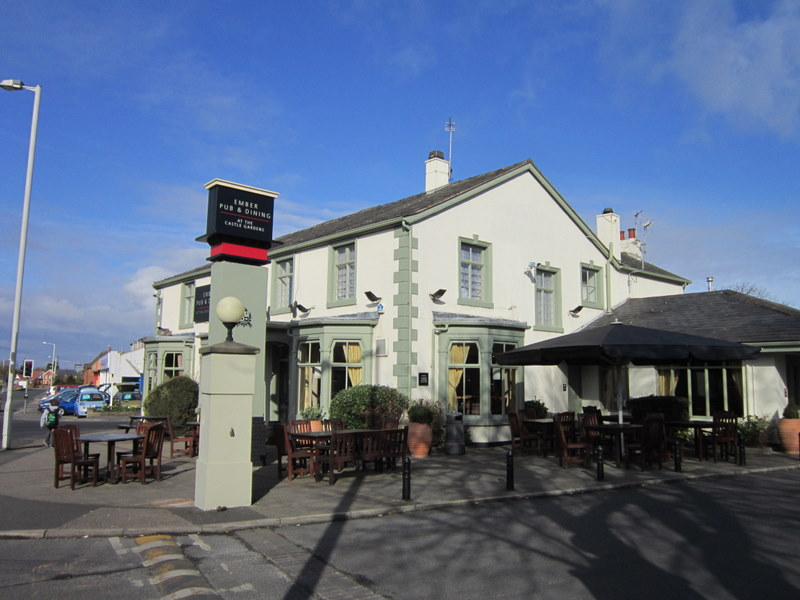
- The Castle Gardens public house

- Shown within Wyre Borough Shown on the Fylde Location within Lancashire
- OS grid reference: SD330393
- District: Wyre
- Shire county: Lancashire
- Region: North West
- Country: England
- Sovereign state: United Kingdom
- Post town: POULTON-LE-FYLDE
- Postcode district: FY6
- Dialling code: 01253
- Police: Lancashire
- Fire: Lancashire
- Ambulance: North West
- UK Parliament: Blackpool North and Fleetwood

Carleton is a village on the coastal plain of the Fylde in the Borough of Wyre in Lancashire, England. It consists of Great Carleton, Little Carleton, Norcross and Whiteholme and is situated close to Poulton-le-Fylde. Other nearby settlements include Thornton, Bispham and Blackpool. Historically, Carleton was in the parish of Poulton-le-Fylde. It borders the Borough of Blackpool immediately to the west.

== History ==
Carleton was listed in the Domesday Book of 1086 as Carlentun. The name usually means "farmstead or estate of the freemen or peasants", derived from the Old Scandinavian word karl and the Old English word tūn. Its area was estimated in that survey to be four carucates of land and it was owned by Earl Tostig. In the 12th century, Carleton was owned by Gilbert Fitz Reinfred, and in the 13th century, by Emma de St. John.

A free school, Carleton St Hilda's C of E Primary School, was founded in 1604 and is still open today.

Carleton Crematorium and Cemetery opened in 1935.

== Governance ==
Carleton is an electoral ward in the parliamentary constituency of Wyre and Preston North. The population of this ward at the 2011 census was 4,061. Since its creation in 2010, Wyre and Preston North has been represented at Parliament by Conservative MP Ben Wallace.

Following the Constituency Boundary Review 2023, Carleton will sit in the Blackpool North and Fleetwood constituency for the next general election in 2024 or 2025.

In 1866 Carleton became a separate civil parish, on 1 April 1934 the parish was abolished and merged with Blackpool, Poulton le Fylde and Thornton. In 1931 the parish had a population of 1508. It is now in the unparished area of Poulton le Fylde.

== Religion ==
The Anglican church of St Hilda of Whitby and the Roman Catholic church of St Martin de Porres share a site on Fleetwood Road. St Hilda's is part of the ecclesiastical parish of St Chad's Church, Poulton-le-Fylde in the Diocese of Blackburn. St Martin's is in the Roman Catholic Diocese of Lancaster.

== See also ==
- Carleton elk
