= St George's School, Blackpool =

St. George's School, Blackpool
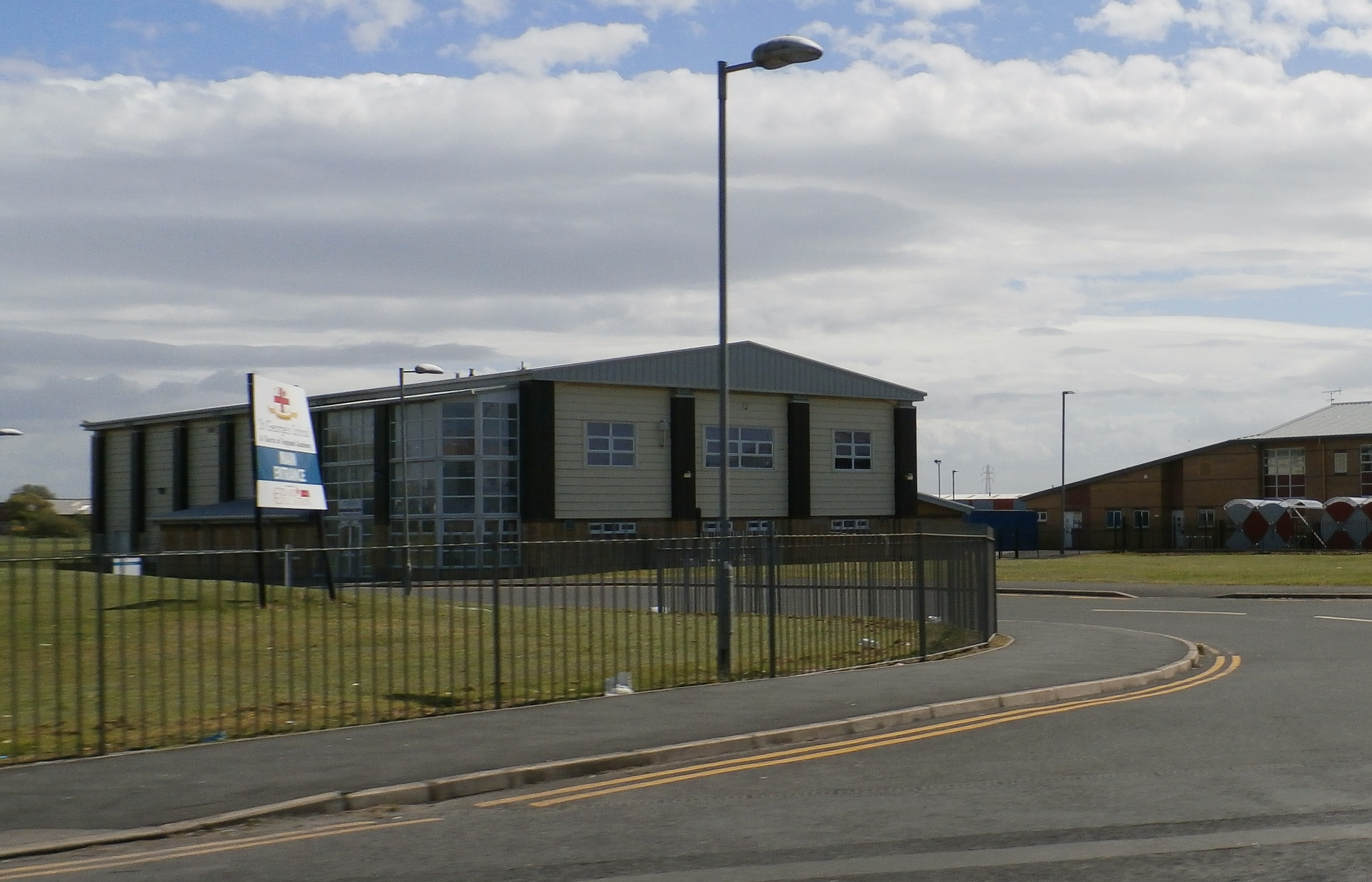
- View of the school grounds

Location
- Cherry Tree Road; Blackpool, Lancashire, FY4 4PH; England; 53.79804°N 3.01512°W

Information
- Type: Academy
- Religious affiliation: Church of England
- Local authority: Blackpool Borough Council
- Department for Education URN: 140759 Tables
- Ofsted: Reports
- Head teacher: Graham Warnock
- Gender: Coeducational
- Age: 11 to 16
- Website: http://www.stgeorgesblackpool.com

St. George's School is a Church of England secondary school with academy status in Marton, Blackpool, Lancashire, England with an intake of both boys and girls aged 11–16. It is located on Cherry Tree Road and has an Ofsted rating of 5 out of 5.

== Buildings ==
The school has undergone a number of refurbishments. A total of £5 Million was spent on the new buildings, including twelve new classrooms, two ICT suites, and a refectory that can hold up to 125 pupils. Other improvements include a new Arts and Crafts section, with five new classrooms and a Drama and Dance suite as well as a new gymnasium which is twice the size of a regulation basketball court. There is also a MUGA with football nets, netball rings and painted markers.

== College System ==
In September 2013, St George's launched a collegiate system. Named after cathedral cities in England, all pupils are assigned to a college for the duration of their time in the school.

College	Colour
Carlisle	Yellow
Chester	Purple
Durham	Red
Lincoln	Green
York	Blue

== Notable Alumni ==
- Tony Ashton (1946-2001), rock musician; performed and recorded with members of Deep Purple, Paul McCartney and Wings, The Who, Chicken Shack, Medicine Head,Family (band),The Spencer Davis Group and London Symphony Orchestra.
