= Thornton Wolf =

The Thornton Wolf is the name given to the remains of a wolf, dating to the Ice age, which were discovered in the garden of a home in Thornton-Cleveleys, Lancashire, England, in 2015.

The bones were given to Manchester Museum, whose experts carried out radiocarbon-dating tests to confirm its age, estimated to be around 20,000 years. The animal's entire skeleton was present.

The remains were found by Simon Ferguson and his sons Richard and Adam.
