= Blackpool Aspire Academy =

High school in Blackpool, England

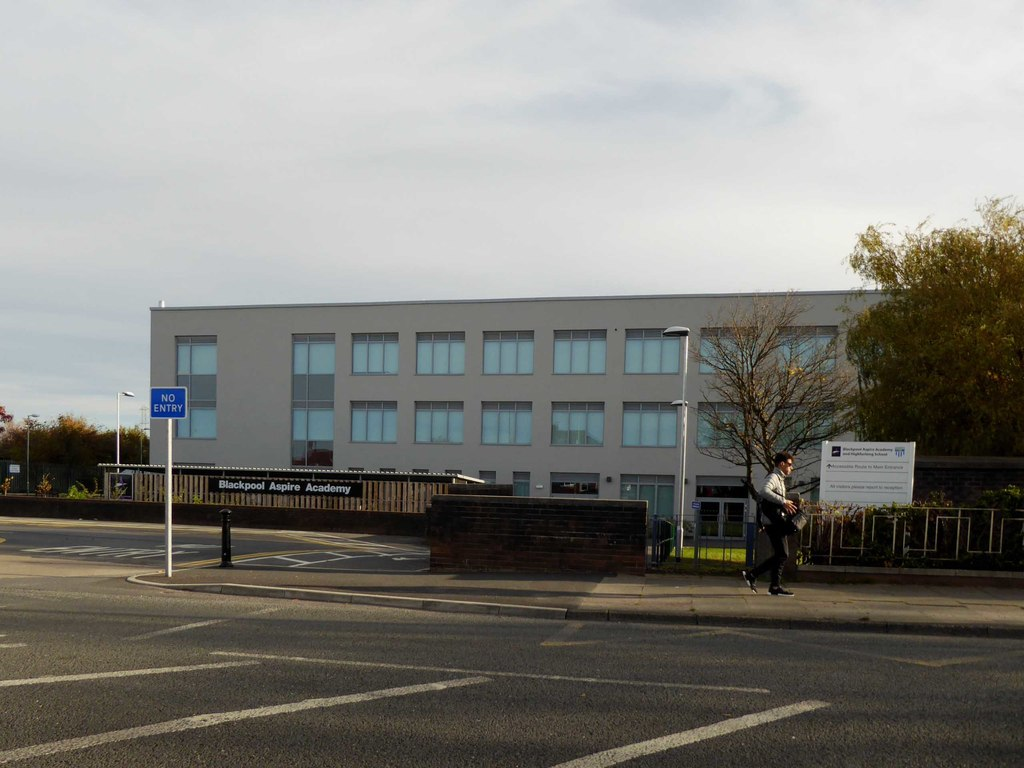
- New school building on Blackpool Old Road (2016)

Location
- Blackpool Old Road; Blackpool, Lancashire, FY3 7LS; England; 53°50′14″N 3°00′55″W

Information
- Type: Academy
- Established: 2014
- Local authority: Blackpool
- Department for Education URN: 141132 Tables
- Ofsted: Reports
- Principal: John Woods
- Age: 11 to 16
- Colour: Purple/black
- Website: www.blackpoolaspireacademy.co.uk

Blackpool Aspire Academy is a secondary school located in the Layton area of Blackpool, Lancashire, England.

The school was formed in 2014 by merging Collegiate High School with Bispham High School Arts College. It was temporarily located on Bispham Road until new buildings were constructed on Blackpool Old Road.

== School history ==
The original school at the site was the all-boys Blackpool Grammar School, which had relocated from the original premises on Raikes Parade to Blackpool Old Road in 1961. In 1971 they amalgamated with Collegiate Girls School whose pupils and staff moved to Blackpool Old Road to create Blackpool Collegiate Grammar School. The sixth form moved to a new Sixth Form Centre premises further down Blackpool Old Road also in 1971 and what is now the independent Blackpool Sixth Form College which split from the school in 1989. The school became Collegiate High School in 1974. The last Headteacher was Ms Cordeaux, followed by acting head Mr Topping for a short while. In 2012, the school achieved its best ever results.

Plans to merge Collegiate with Bispham High School Arts College were under discussion 2012–14. The new merged school (named Blackpool Aspire Academy) is sponsored by the Fylde Coast Academy Trust. The school was temporarily housed at the former Bispham High School campus, but relocated to new buildings at the Collegiate site during 2015.

== Notable former pupils ==
=== Collegiate High School ===
- Matty Kay, professional footballer

=== Blackpool Grammar School ===
- Ian Anderson, singer, songwriter and multi-instrumentalist, best known for his work as the head of rock band Jethro Tull who played two concerts at the school on 20 December 1965 and 4 April 1966.
- Nick Butler, special adviser to prime minister Gordon Brown
- Alistair Cooke, journalist, television personality and broadcaster
- Kenneth Cragg, Anglican clergyman and scholar
- Peter Crampton, Labour Party MEP for Kingston upon Hull, 1989–99
- George Cunningham, Labour and Social Democratic Party MP for Islington South West from 1970 to 1974, and Islington South and Finsbury from 1974 to 1983
- John Evan, keyboardist with Jethro Tull
- Alfred Gregory, mountain climber, explorer and professional photographer
- Tony Gubba, journalist and sports commentator
- Sir Peter Hall, town planner, urbanist and geographer
- Jeffrey Hammond, bass guitar player with Jethro Tull
- Arnold W. G. Kean, most notable for his contribution to the development of civil aviation law
- Ernest Mason, World War II flying ace
- Mick McGuire, footballer for clubs including Coventry City and Norwich City
- Eric Mottram, teacher, critic, editor and poet
- Hargreaves Parkinson, Editor of the Financial Times from 1945 to 1950
- John Robb, journalist, television personality and broadcaster and musician
- Tom Whiteside, Historian of Mathematics at the University of Cambridge
- John Yates, Anglican clergyman. Bishop of Whitby from 1972 to 1975, then Bishop of Gloucester until 1992, and finally Bishop at Lambeth until 1994.

=== Blackpool Collegiate School for Girls ===
- Averil Mansfield, vascular surgeon and the first British woman to be appointed a professor of surgery
- Barbara Robotham, opera singer and voice teacher at the Royal Northern College of Music
- Annie St John, television continuity announcer and presenter
