= Lytham Windmill =

Windmill in Lancashire, England

Coordinates: 53.7369°N 2.9543°W

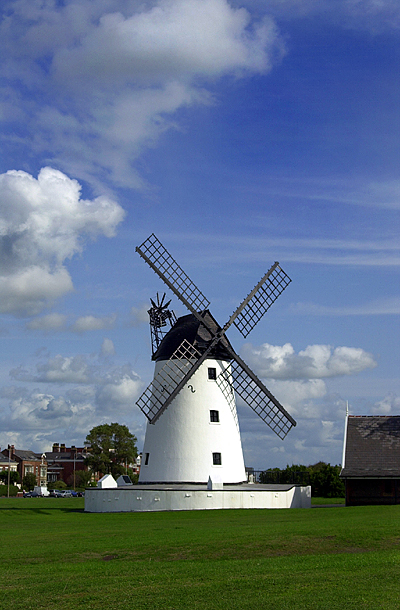
Lytham Windmill

Lytham Windmill is situated on Lytham Green in the coastal town of Lytham St Annes, Lancashire, England. It is of the type known as a tower mill and was designed for grinding wheat and oats to make flour or bran. Since commercial milling on the site ceased in 1921 the mill has belonged to the town and is operated by Fylde Borough Council, who open it to the public during the summer. The mill also contains a museum run by the Lytham Heritage Trust which explains the history and practice of flour milling.

The mill was built on Lytham marshes around 1805 on land leased by the local landowner and squire to miller Richard Cookson. Some of the mill's machinery, including a 150-year-old mainshaft of Baltic oak, was salvaged from other local mills. The plinth which now surrounds the mill was added later for safety reasons. The original smoky drying kiln, once adjacent to the mill, was moved to Kiln Street after pressure from well-to-do local residents in the growing town. The surrounding land was later levelled and grassed to form a ribbon green between the houses and the sea, in the middle of which stands the mill.

In 1919 a high wind overcame the mill's braking mechanism and the sails spun out of control, causing the mill to be burnt out. Two years later the squire, John T. Clifton, donated the gutted building to the town. The shell was restored, given a new cap, a set of mock sails and used variously as a cafe, as headquarters of Lytham Cruising Club, Motorboat Club and Sea Cadets and even as an Electricity Board sub-station.

In 1951 the mill was designated a grade II listed building. In 1989 it was totally restored by Fylde Borough Council and opened to the public.

== History of the Mill ==
Windmills have featured in Lytham's history for hundreds of years. In 1805 Richard Cookson sought and obtained a lease from the Squire for a plot of land on which to build a 'windy milne'. Later, in 1860, when the prestigious houses in the area were being built the residents looked upon the windmill as an "industrial nuisance". On 2 January 1919, a tremendous gale turned the sails despite the powerful brake and sparks ignited the woodwork. The Windmill was quickly ravaged by fire, the interior being entirely gutted. The Windmill remained derelict until 1921, when it was given by the Squire to the Lytham Urban District Council. In 1989, the Windmill was restored by Fylde Borough Council and opened to the public. Lytham Windmill is run in partnership with Fylde Borough Council and Lytham Heritage Group.

== See also ==
- Listed buildings in Lytham
- List of windmills in Lancashire
