= Main Dyke =

Waterway on the Fylde, Lancashire, England

Main Dyke is a water channel running through the Fylde area of Lancashire, England. It is an outflow of the largely drained Marton Mere, Blackpool, though Marton Mere originally released its waters via Spen Brook in the opposite direction.

The Main Dyke joins the River Wyre at Skippool, appearing to follow the course of an earlier "Skippon River" (named as such on John Speed's map of the county).
