= Devonshire Primary Academy =

Location
- Devonshire Road; Blackpool, Lancashire, FY3 8AF; England
- Coordinates: 53.8227°N 3.0379°W

Information
- Type: Primary academy
- Established: 19th century (as Devonshire Road School)
- Department for Education URN: 140128 Tables
- Ofsted: Reports
- Headteacher: Mr D Simm
- Gender: Coeducational
- Age: 4 to 11
- Enrolment: 500
- Website: devonshire.blackpool.sch.uk

Devonshire Primary Academy is a coeducational primary school with academy status, located in the Layton area of Blackpool, Lancashire, England.

This school is located on Devonshire Road halfway between the residential area of Layton, and Blackpool town centre. It was formerly known as Devonshire Road Junior School and then Devonshire Primary School before being renamed in 2013.

== Devonshire Road Junior School ==
The original school on the site, Devonshire Road Junior School was built in the 19th century. On 23 August 2003 the school suffered an arson attack causing £7m worth of damage. Over fifty firefighters fought the blaze which caused extensive damage to the school building. Pupils were forced to re-locate to Boundary School, two miles away. The building was eventually demolished and rebuilt as a modern, state-of-the-art school. Some bricks from the original school building were salvaged and eventually sold off to raise money for a school project.

Blackpool Council spent £7M building the new school which opened, three years after the original school was demolished, on 6 September 2006. The school was renamed Devonshire Primary School, and was designed around a beehive concept with classrooms and play decks on the same level, with a commitment to sustainability. The building houses a roof garden with a pond and weather station on the second floor which is used for outdoor science and environmental studies. At the centre of the building is a "flexible social area" used for dining and pupil interaction. Each level also has south facing play decks with sheltered play areas. The school building also contains two rooms for use by local community groups with the Multi-Use Games Area (MUGA) providing a sports area for children and adults.

In 2007 the new school building won a Royal Institute of British Architects (RIBA) Award and was shortlisted for the RIBA Stirling Prize Schools Award. The RIBA Award report about the school said, "Built on three storeys, the school is orientated east-west around an internal street with teaching houses facing north and play-decks facing south. Circulation is simple and effective and choices are provided by the external stairs and decks. By breaking the building down into smaller elements, the sense of scale is made intimate. On the ground floor the spaces are arranged off a generous cross axis with a curvy blue library at one end and yellow ‘custard area’ and hall at the other." In the Stirling Prize, the school was runner-up in the Schools Award in October 2007.

The school converted to academy status on 1 September 2013 and was renamed Devonshire Primary Academy.
