= Bispham High School Arts College =

Coordinates: 53.8422°N 3.0335°W

Location
- Bispham Road; Bispham, Blackpool, Lancashire, FY2 0NH; England

Information
- Type: Community school
- Motto: The Best For All, The Best From All
- Established: 2000
- Closed: 2014
- Local authority: Blackpool
- Department for Education URN: 119734 Tables
- Ofsted: Reports
- Head teacher: Tony Nicholson
- Gender: Coeducational
- Age: 11 to 16
- Enrolment: 800
- Colours: Navy blue and yellow
- Publication: Bispham News
- Website: www.bisphamhigh.co.uk

Bispham High School Arts College was a secondary school situated in Bispham, Blackpool, Lancashire, England, with a mixed intake of both boys and girls aged 11–16. It was replaced with Blackpool Aspire Academy in 2014.

== History ==
Bispham High School was formerly an all girls' school, founded in the 1950s.

Bispham was initially called Arnold High School for Girls, a girls' grammar school, having been split from local public school Arnold School by the local council. Arnold Girls' amalgamated with local girls' secondary modern Claremont to become Arnold-Claremont in 1975, before changing its name to Greenlands (Kelly Green, gold, and white uniform, 6th form wore bottle green uniform, distinguished from lower school by green and white striped shirt or open collar white shirt) in 1976. The school had an 11 to 18 age range until 1989, when Blackpool Council separated from Lancashire County Council and moved A Levels to Blackpool Sixth Form College.

The school became Bispham High School (navy blue, grey, and yellow uniform), a co educational secondary school, a specialist Performing Arts College and a Centre of Excellence for Performing Arts in 2000. At the last arts college redesignation, the school was judged exceptional in every criterion.

Plans to merge Bispham and Collegiate High School were under discussion from 2012 to 2014. The new merged school (named Blackpool Aspire Academy) was formally created in September 2014, and is sponsored by the Fylde Coast Academy Trust. The school was temporarily housed at the former Bispham High School campus, but has now been relocated to new buildings at the Collegiate site during November 2015.

== Academic subjects and achievements ==
In 2011, 86% of the school's students achieved a GCSE equivalent pass rate of five or more A to C grades. This was the best result in the school's history. The school was acknowledged by the Specialist Schools and Academies Trust at that point as one of the country's most improved schools. The final two percentages (2013 and 2014) for GCSE 5 A-Cs including English and Maths (the new government measure) were 47% and 43%.

The school held the ICT Mark, the Eco Silver Award, the Geography Quality Mark and the Specialist Schools and Academies Trust's Cultural Diversity Quality Standard Gold Award.

The school offered French, Spanish and German on the Modern Foreign Languages programme. It offered Food Technology, Resistant Materials, Graphic Design and Textiles as Design Technology options. It also offered a variety of BTEC course subjects to 14 to 16-year olds as well as the usual GCSE programme.

The school had firm links with most Further and Higher Education establishments in The Fylde.

== Building and refurbishment project ==
A£6M project was completed in the beginning of 2007. The project included -

- A two-floor unit housing a Learning Resource Centre and library on the first floor and a computer suite, Recording Studio and Video/Film/Media editing suite on the ground floor

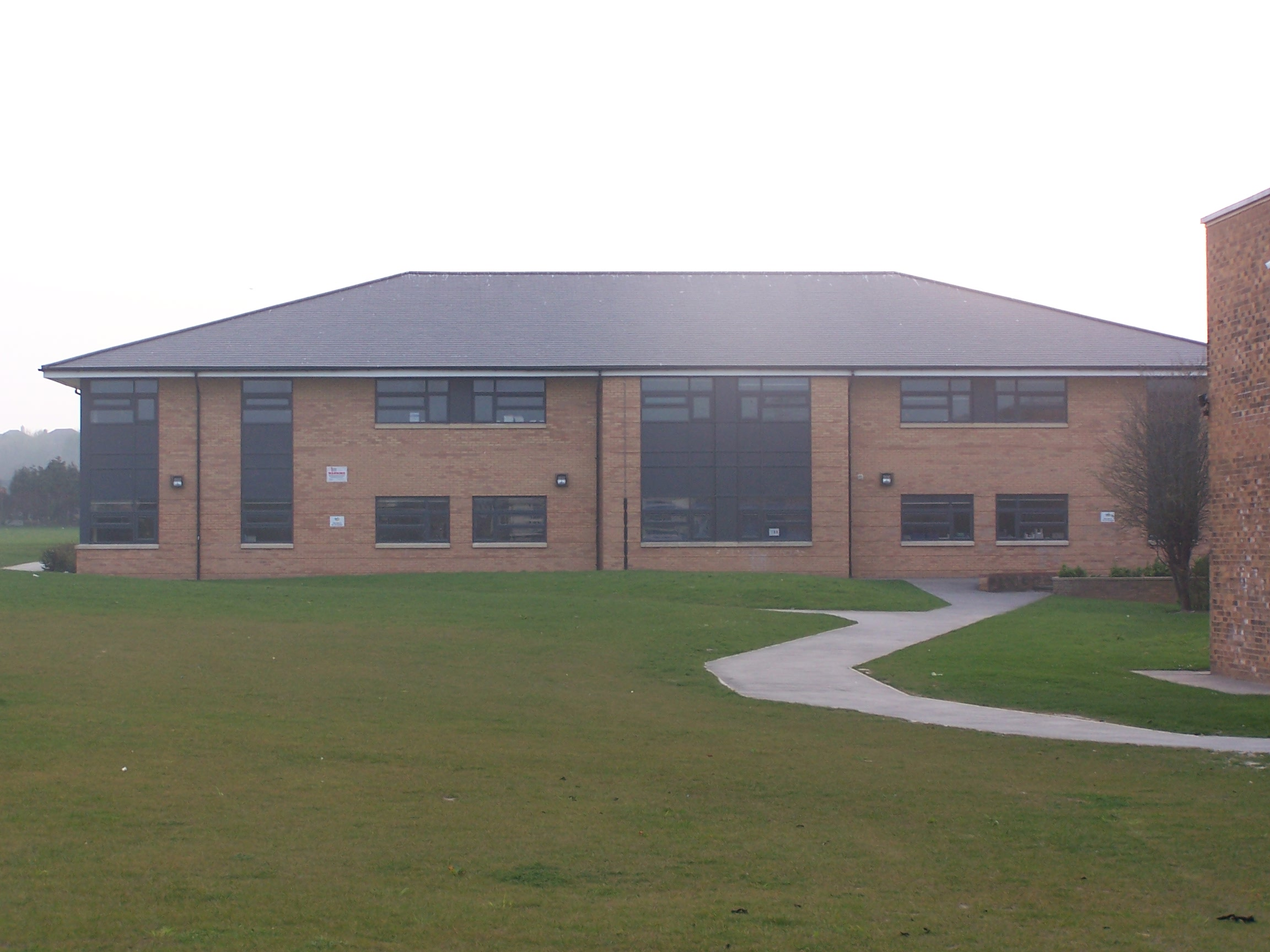
Part of the new development

- A 14 classroom block for Humanities and English Faculties
- Arts Block with two large Drama Studios
- Additional dance studio
- Second restaurant
- Entrance/reception block with administration offices plus atrium

The administration centre and atrium were opened on 7 November 2006, by retired Blackpool footballer and former Deputy Lieutenant of Lancashire, Jimmy Armfield OBE.

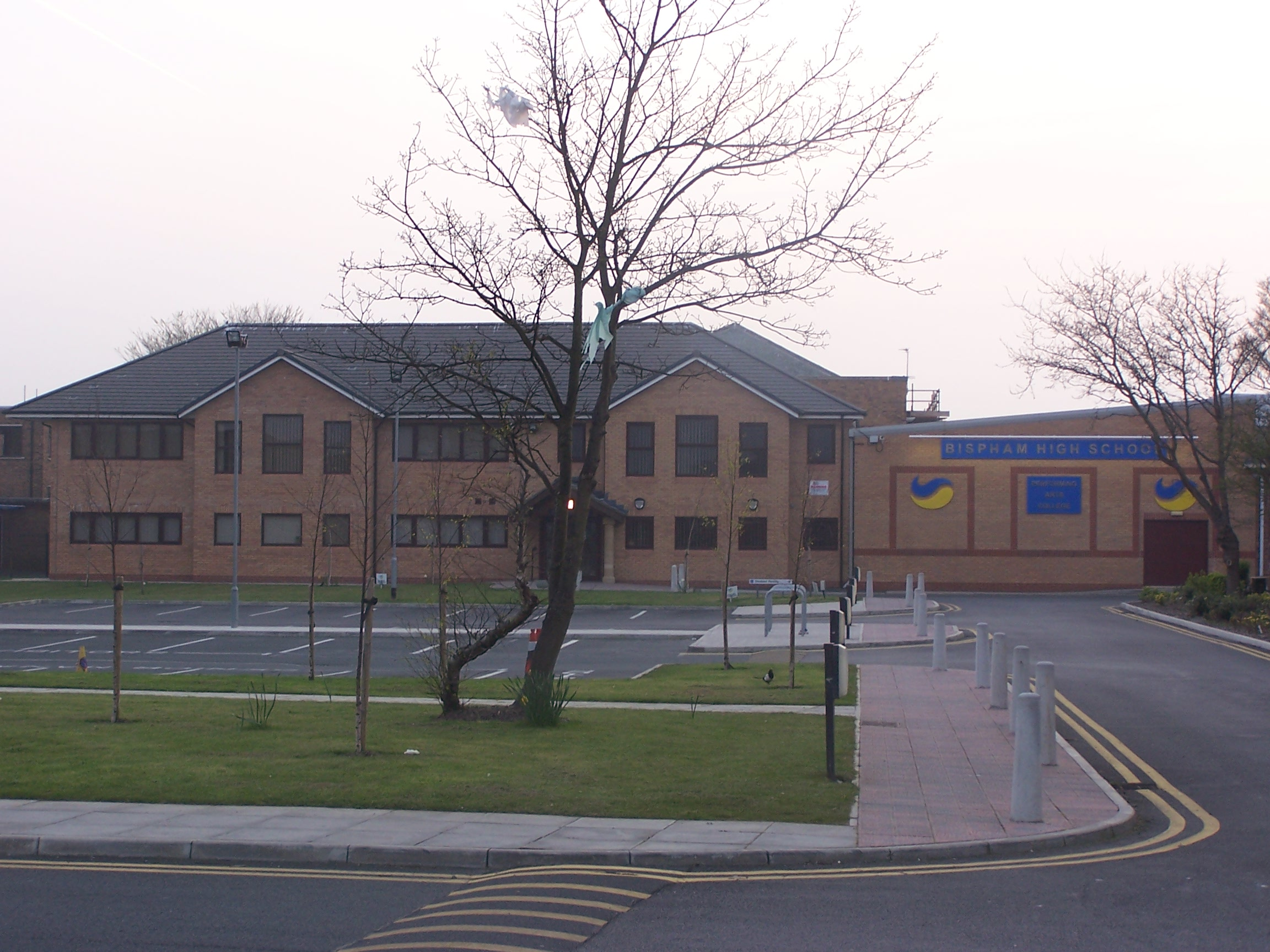
Front view of Bispham High School

- Upgrade of classrooms, new car parks, more disabled facilities etc.
- The school now has eleven computer suites.

== Notable pupils ==
- Ex Emmerdale actress, Kelsey-Beth Crossley.
- Musician Karima Francis.
- Actress Jacqueline Leonard was a pupil of Greenlands.
- Athlete Kirsty Mackay GB & England Hockey Player, part of the Gold medal squad in Rio 2016 Olympics.

== Performing Arts Projects ==
The school worked with the Royal Ballet School, London and possessed an Arts Council England Artsmark Gold. It was regarded as a centre of excellence for Dance and was widely acclaimed for its high grades in the subject and work within the community.

The school also had a successful gospel choir, Bispham High School Gospel Choir.

In March 2007, the choir recorded a cover version of Crazy by Gnarls Barkley for the BBC 6 Music Hardchoral competition in which they reached the top ten. The choir made its national debut when the song was played on the BBC 6 Music Breakfast Show over the Easter Weekend in April 2007.

On 17 April 2007 the choir sang their version of Crazy on BBC 6 Music during a live broadcast from the school hall, as part of the Hardchoral competition.

The choir released two CDs.
