= St Mary's Catholic Academy =

Location
- St Walburga's Road; Blackpool, Lancashire, FY3 7EQ; England; 53.8269°N 3.0210°W

Information
- Type: Academy
- Motto: Semper Fidelis
- Religious affiliation: Roman Catholic
- Established: 1856; 1975 (merger)
- Local authority: Blackpool
- Department for Education URN: 141257 Tables
- Ofsted: Reports
- Headteacher: Simon Eccles
- Gender: Coeducational
- Age: 11 to 18
- Enrolment: 1,334
- Website: http://www.st-mary.blackpool.sch.uk

St Mary's Catholic Academy (formerly St Mary's Catholic College) is a school in Layton, Blackpool, Lancashire. The school was involved with the Building Schools for the Future (BSF) scheme and, despite the scheme being cancelled, it was announced in August 2010 that for this school it would go ahead.

With more than 1800 pupils, it is the largest Roman Catholic secondary school in Lancashire. The school is on the site of the former Convent of the Holy Child Jesus (usually known as Layton Hill Convent, Blackpool), on St. Walburga's Road near to Blackpool Victoria Hospital.

== School history ==
The Society of the Holy Child Jesus (SHCJ) is a Catholic religious order for women which was founded in England in 1846. It follows the rules of the Society of Jesus (the Jesuit order for men). In 1856, Alexander Goss, the Roman Catholic Bishop of Liverpool (in which Diocese Blackpool then was) invited the sisters of the Society of the Holy Child Jesus to send out a branch from their house in Liverpool to teach in Father Bampton's Poor School on Talbot Road, Blackpool and they had arrived with 12 girl boarders. With accommodation in Queen's Square acquired for themselves and for the girls, the school flourished. It was run by a man.

After four years of such success, Bishop Goss agreed that the sisters could be rather more adventurous than their original mandate. So, in 1860, the original St Mary's was founded as a school for girls. This original school was located in a building called Raikes Hall in Raikes Parade, Blackpool. It is now a pub called the Raikes Hotel. Success was marked by rapid growth and in 1870 St Mary's moved to the site which the sisters already owned at Layton Hill where were located the original premises, much of which are still extant and form part of the modern school.

The school admitted boys by 1880 but in 1900 they were separated out and St Joseph's College, Blackpool was founded for them in Park Road where they were taught by lay teachers. There were several removals between Park Road and Whitegate Lane (now Whitegate Drive) and back until St Joseph's finally moved to Layton Mount on Newton Drive in 1918. Layton Mount had been built as a residence for Yorkshire mill owner William Lumb in 1895.

In 1923 Archbishop Frederick Keating (Liverpool had become an archdiocese in 1911) invited the Irish Christian Brothers in Liverpool to take over the running of St Joseph's and they did so. In November 1924, Blackpool was transferred into the new Roman Catholic Diocese of Lancaster. The brothers remained in charge at St Joseph's until their enforced departure in 1975 when a new Lancaster Diocesan rule required all Catholic schools to become co-educational. As the constitution of the order of the Christian Brothers forbade them to teach girls, they were unable to stay. In that year St Joseph's re-merged with Layton Hill Convent to form St Mary's Catholic College. Meanwhile, Layton Hill Convent had been flourishing as the principal Catholic girls' grammar school in the Fylde and it was its Head Teacher since 1966, Sister Maureen Grimley (SHCJ) (1932–2007), who became the first Head Teacher of the re-combined school.

In 1977 the administration of the school was taken over by the Roman Catholic Diocese of Lancaster although Sister Maureen remained as Head Teacher until 1984 and sisters of the order still teach there. Initially the reunited school operated on two campuses, but the St Joseph's campus was shut down in the early 1980s and sold for housing development. Further expansion occurred in 1982 when the school was merged with two Catholic former secondary modern schools, St Thomas of Canterbury's and St Catherine's, which themselves had merged to form All Saints RC High School.

== Notable former pupils ==
=== At Layton Hill ===
- Dorothy Byrne - Head of News and Current Affairs, Channel 4
- Mary Josephine Dunn (Jo Beverley) (b. 1947), a prolific British-Canadian writer of popular historical romance novels under her married name.
- Cecilia Loftus (1876–1943) - Actress, singer, mimic, vaudevillian and music hall performer

=== At Convent of the Holy Child ===
- Dame Sheila Quinn (1920–2016) - Fellow of the Royal College of Nursing and distinguished Nursing Administrator

=== At St Catherine's ===
- The Nolans - Anne (b. 1950), Denise (b. 1952), Maureen (b. 1954), Linda (b. 1959) and Bernadette (Bernie) (b. 1960) who were singing stars of stage and television from the 1970s.

=== At St Joseph's ===
- George Carman QC (1929–2001), distinguished defence counsel in many of the most celebrated criminal and libel trials of the last quarter of the 20th century.
- John Crosland (1922–2006), footballer with Blackpool and AFC Bournemouth.
- John Mahoney (1940–2018) - American film and television actor best known for his role as "Martin Crane" on the sitcom Frasier
- Tom McNally, Baron McNally (b. 1943) - politician, political advisor to Labour Foreign Secretary then Prime Minister James Callaghan, Labour MP, then Social Democratic Party MP, then influential political lobbyist and finally Leader of the Liberal Democrats in the House of Lords
- Owen Oyston (b. 1934) - Self-made businessman and former owner of Blackpool F.C.; later convicted of rape and sentenced to five years imprisonment
- Lawrence Whalley (MD, DPM, FRCP(E), FRCPsych), Crombie Ross Professor of Mental Health at the University of Aberdeen
- Larry Cassidy (1953-2010) Singer and bassist for post-punk and electronic band Section 25.

=== At St Mary's ===
- Stephen Tompkinson, Actor
- Aiden Grimshaw, X Factor contestant (Series 7)
- Chris Webb (b. 1986), MP for Blackpool South
