= Staining, Lancashire =

Village in Lancashire, England

Coordinates: 53.817°N 2.991°W

Staining
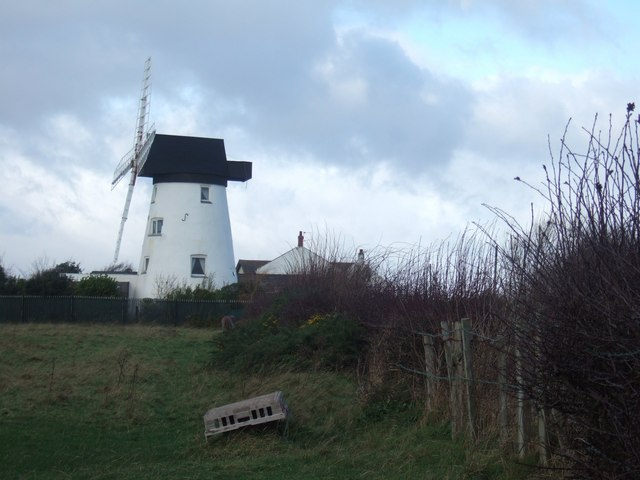
- Staining Windmill

- Flag

- Shown within Fylde Borough Shown within the Fylde Location within Lancashire
- Population: 2,290 (2011 Census)
- OS grid reference: SD347361
- Civil parish: Staining
- District: Fylde
- Shire county: Lancashire
- Region: North West
- Country: England
- Sovereign state: United Kingdom
- Post town: BLACKPOOL
- Postcode district: FY3
- Dialling code: 01253
- Police: Lancashire
- Fire: Lancashire
- Ambulance: North West
- UK Parliament: Fylde

Staining is a village and civil parish in the Fylde district, in Lancashire, England, on the Fylde coast close to the seaside resorts of Blackpool and Lytham St Annes, and the market town of Poulton-le-Fylde. At the 2011 Census, it had a population of 2,290. Historically, the village was part of the township of Hardhorn-with-Newton. Now the hamlet of Newton is part of the civil parish of Staining; Hardhorn belongs to Poulton-le-Fylde.

== History ==
At the Norman Conquest, Staining was part of the hundred of Amounderness, in the possession of Earl Tostig, the brother of King Harold II. Tostig died at the Battle of Stamford Bridge and his lands were subsequently taken over by the Normans. Between 1069 and 1086 William the Conqueror gave Amounderness to Anglo-Norman baron Roger the Poitevin. Staining was recorded in the Domesday Book of 1086 as Staininghe. The village was estimated in that survey to contain six carucates of land.

== Governance ==
Historically, Staining, as part of the township of Hardhorn-with-Newton, was in the ecclesiastical parish of Poulton-le-Fylde, in the hundred of Amounderness, an ancient division of the historic county of Lancashire. Today, Staining is a civil parish, governed by a parish council.

Staining is part of the electoral ward of Staining and Weeton. The population of this ward at the 2011 census was 3,146.

Staining is represented in the House of Commons of the Parliament of the United Kingdom as part of Fylde. It elects one MP by the first past the post system of election.

== Geography ==
Immediately south of Staining is Marton Mere, a Site of Special Scientific Interest.

Staining has a generally temperate maritime climate like much of the British Isles, with cool summers and mild winters. There is an annual average rainfall of 871.3 millimetres (34.30 in).

Climate data for Blackpool (1971–2000 averages)
Month	Jan	Feb	Mar	Apr	May	Jun	Jul	Aug	Sep	Oct	Nov	Dec	Year
Mean daily maximum °C (°F)	6.8 (44.2)	7.1 (44.8)	9.1 (48.4)	11.6 (52.9)	15.2 (59.4)	17.3 (63.1)	19.4 (66.9)	19.4 (66.9)	17.0 (62.6)	13.7 (56.7)	9.8 (49.6)	7.6 (45.7)	12.9 (55.2)
Mean daily minimum °C (°F)	1.7 (35.1)	1.6 (34.9)	3.1 (37.6)	4.2 (39.6)	6.9 (44.4)	10.0 (50.0)	12.4 (54.3)	12.3 (54.1)	10.2 (50.4)	7.3 (45.1)	4.3 (39.7)	2.5 (36.5)	6.4 (43.5)
Average rainfall mm (inches)	81.1 (3.19)	58.7 (2.31)	68.3 (2.69)	48.9 (1.93)	49.0 (1.93)	59.8 (2.35)	59.5 (2.34)	73.4 (2.89)	82.5 (3.25)	97.9 (3.85)	94.0 (3.70)	58.3 (2.30)	871.3 (34.30)
Source: Met Office

== Demography ==
At the 2011 UK Census, the civil parish of Staining had a population of 2,290, with 953 households.

Population growth in Hardhorn-With-Newton and Staining parish since 1801
Year	1801	1811	1821	1831	1841	1851	1861	1871	1881	1891	1901	1911	1921	1931	1939	1951	1961	1971	1981	1991	2001	2011
Population	311						386		420	462	597	858	764	1,036		794	923				2,312	2,290

== Landmarks ==
Staining Windmill was probably built in the late 18th century. It is white, constructed of rendered brick and has a wooden cap. It has been designated a Grade II listed building by English Heritage.

St Luke's Church was built in 1865. It is an Anglican church in the Diocese of Blackburn, the archdeaconry of Lancaster and the deanery of Blackpool.

== See also ==
- Listed buildings in Staining, Lancashire
- List of places in Lancashire
