= Marton, Blackpool =

Marton
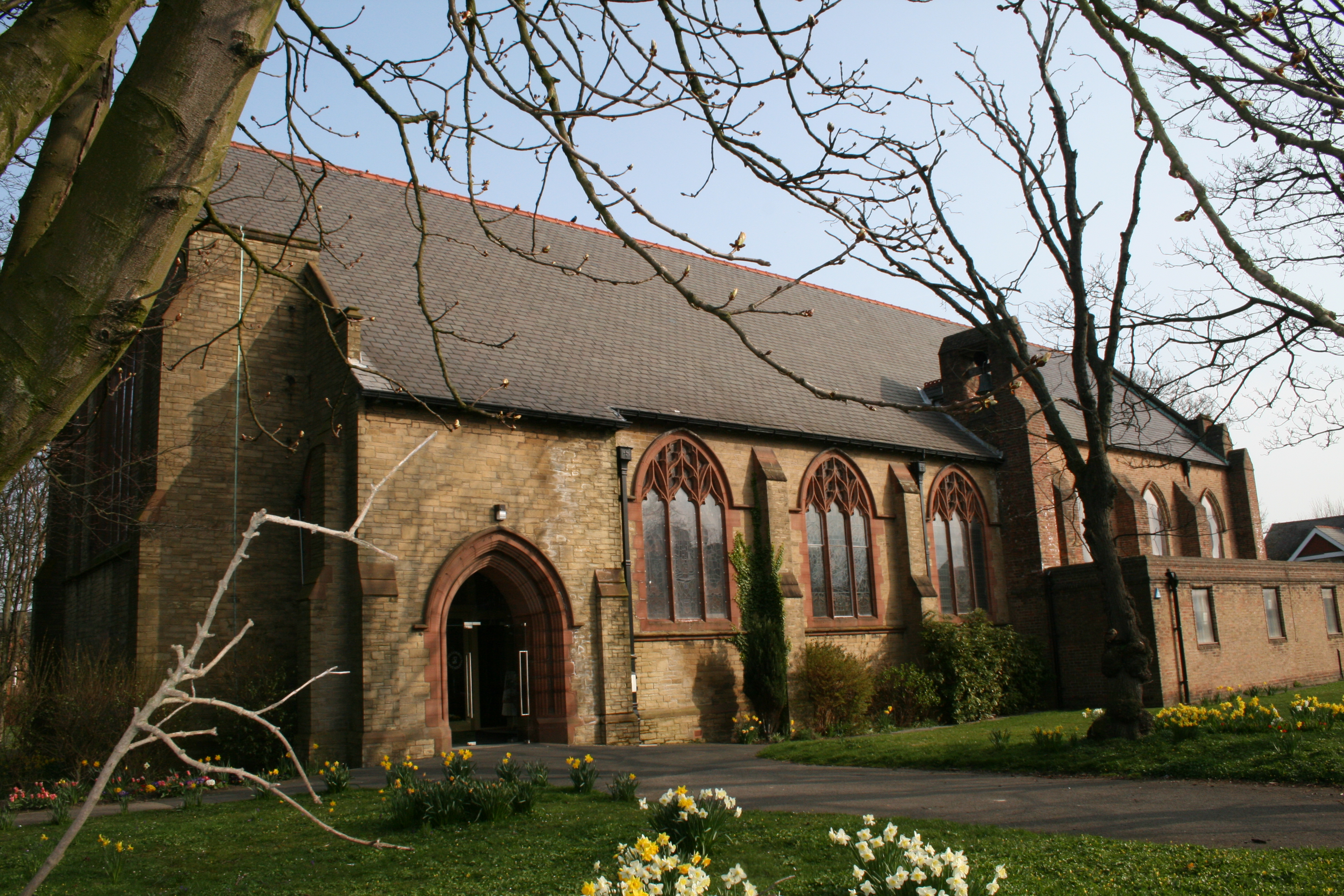
- St Pauls Church

- Location within Blackpool Location within Lancashire
- Coordinates: 53.797305°N 3.018837°W
- Country: England
- Ceremonial county: Lancashire
- Unitary authority: Blackpool

Marton is a historic village on the coastal plain of the Fylde in the Borough of Blackpool in Lancashire, England, most of which is now forms a part of the town of Blackpool. Marton, consists of Great Marton, Little Marton, Marton Fold and The Peel.

== History ==
Great Marton and Little Marton were collectively listed in the Domesday Book of 1086 as Meretun. The name usually means "farmstead by a pool", derived from the Old English words mere and tūn. Its area was estimated in that survey to be six carucates of arable land.

By no later than the end of the 11th century, St Chad's Church had been built in the nearby town of Poulton-le-Fylde and became the parish church for the area following the Reformation in the 16th century. Marton residents travelled 5 miles (8.0 km) to worship at St Chad's, a journey that was difficult in winter. Around 1625, they petitioned to become a separate parish from Poulton-le-Fylde, with Layton and Blackpool. It was not until 1800 that their request was granted and the Church of St Paul was built in Great Marton. Originally a chapel of Poulton-le-Fylde, the church was consecrated in 1804. It later became a parish church. In 1857, the church as extended to accommodate Marton's growing population, and a tower was added.

Marton was formerly a township and chapelry in the parish of Poulton-le-Fylde, in 1866 Marton became a separate civil parish, in 1894, the hamlet of Great Marton was incorporated into Blackpool and parts of Little Marton into St-Anne's-on-Sea, on 1 April 1934 the parish was abolished and merged with Blackpool and Westby with Plumpton. In 1931 the parish had a population of 4476.

== Governance ==
Marton is an electoral ward in the borough constituency of Blackpool South. Since 1997, Blackpool South had been represented at parliament by Labour MP Gordon Marsden. Since the 2019 General Election the area's representation has passed to Conservative MP Scott Benton.

== Geography ==
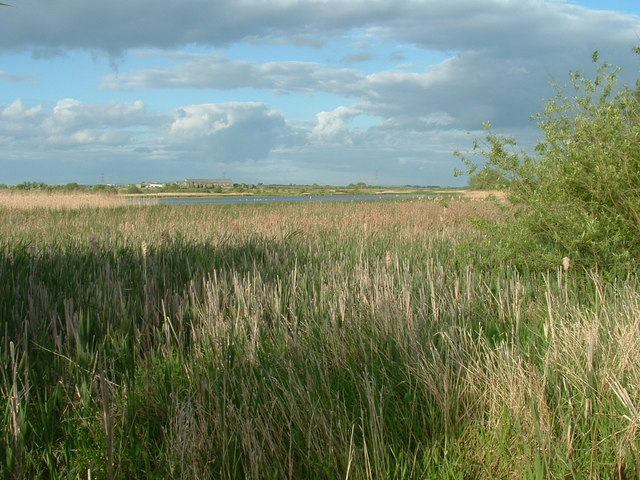
Marton Mere

The pool referred to by Marton's name is Marton Mere. The glacial freshwater lake was once approximately 6 miles (9.7 km) long and 1 mile (1.6 km) wide. It was gradually drained throughout the 18th century to allow land to be reclaimed for agriculture. The mere is now part of Marton Mere Local Nature Reserve, which has been designated a Site of Special Scientific Interest.

The other prominent geographical feature of the area is Marton Moss. It is approximately 6 miles (9.7 km) long and 1.5 miles (2.4 km) wide. The structure of the moss is peat, on top of a layer of clay, in which is embedded whole (and fragments of) tree trunks. These trunks indicate that the area was once covered in dense woodland.

== Landmarks ==
The original Church of St Paul was replaced by the current church, built 1908–09. It is situated a few metres from the original site, on Whitegate Drive, and was designed by F. Freeman of Bolton. It is constructed of red and yellow sandstone, with more recent additions in brick.

Little Marton Mill, situated close to the M55 motorway, was built in 1838 on the site of a previous mill. It was a working gristmill, grinding corn until 1928. It is the only remaining mill in Blackpool.

== Education ==
The first school in Marton was Baines' Free School, built in 1717, financed by James Baines who also built schools in Hardhorn-cum-Newton and Thornton. The school still exists, as Baines' Endowed Church of England Primary School. St Nicholas Church of England Primary School was founded in 1830, Our Lady of the Assumption Roman Catholic Primary was opened in 1953 and Marton Primary School was founded in 1991. Marton also has two secondary schools, Highfield Leadership Academy and St George's School.
