= Grange Park, Blackpool =

Council estate in Blackpool, England

Coordinates: 53.82897°N 3.01415°W

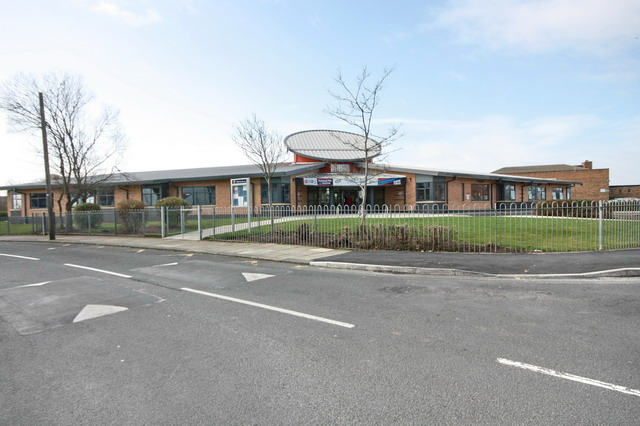
Community centre

Grange Park is a council-built estate in Blackpool, Lancashire, England. It consists of about 1,800 dwellings mostly 1940s and 1970s housing, with a population of over 6,000. It is one of the largest council estates in Lancashire, and for many years suffered from serious social disorder with a reputation within the town for crime and drugs. Following the establishment, in 1997, of a problem-oriented policing initiative the estate has seen a huge turnround resulting in a Government sustainable community award in 2005.

== Geography and administration ==
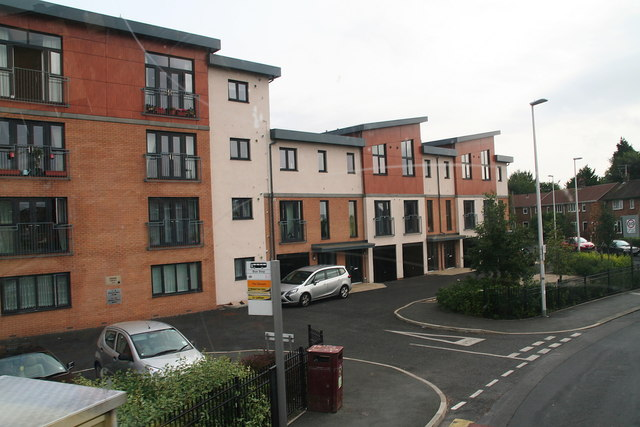
Flats on Dinmore Avenue

The estate is part of the borough of Blackpool. The area is mostly urban. Grange Park is in the Blackpool North and Cleveleys constituency. Grange Park has one electoral ward, Park with two councillors.

== History ==
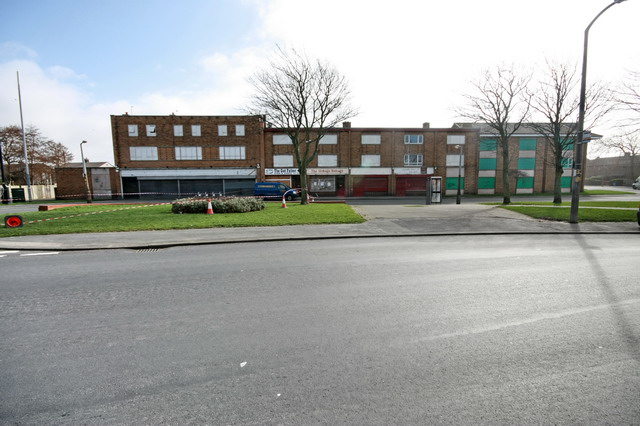
Disused shops on Dinmore Avenue (2009)

The estates first housing was built in 1948, and it is the largest council populated area per head of local population in England.

For many years the estate was classed as a socially deprived area and encountered serious problems including poor image, poor educational standards, high unemployment rates, a range of social and behavioural problems and environmental dereliction. In April 1997, the Grange Park Initiative project was established to improve the estate and make it a better place to live. It began as a commitment by Bispham Police, who police the estate, to take a long term problem-oriented policing approach to the communities needs after consultations with local people, councillors and the Resident Association groups.

The Grange Park Initiative objectives when it was established were:

1. To improve the quality of life on the Grange Park Estate
2. To target criminals and those involved in nuisance and disorder
3. Create an environment for families
4. Promote partnerships
5. To encourage the accurate reporting and recording of crime, disorder and fear of crime

The estate's first Neighbourhood Watch scheme was set up in June 1998. On 4 July 1998, the estate celebrated its 50th anniversary with a procession and an It's a Knockout style competition on the playing fields of Grange Park Junior School.

In February 2005, Grange Park won the Deputy Prime Minister, John Prescott's Award for Sustainable Communities as part of the Government of the United Kingdom's Sustainable Communities Plan. At the award ceremony, John Prescott said of the estate, "The people of Grange Park live in one of the most deprived parts of the country...but they were determined to do something about it. Thanks to their energy and commitment, they've found new security and confidence in the place they live." Prescott also visited Grange Park during the Labour Party spring conference, spending time at the Blackpool City Learning Centre.

On 31 March 2006, Blackpool Council hosted a one-day conference "Sustainable Communities: Vision into Reality" at the Palace of Westminster where they showed how "a strong multi agency approach working closely with the community has improved life for the residents of Grange Park." In April 2007, it was revealed that crime on the estate had fallen by a further 9% in the preceding two years with the local Police Inspector, saying, "I think the drop has come as a result of a lot of hard work that has been going on over the last 10 years which is now coming to fruition."

== Education ==
Grange Park has two primary schools, Boundary Primary School on Dinmore Avenue and Christ the King Catholic Academy on Adstone Avenue; linked with St. Mary's Catholic Academy. The town's City Learning Centre is located on Bathurst Avenue. It is a state of the art technology and resource centre which uses information technology to help local school pupils and community. It has three large training rooms as well as a professional standard broadcasting studio and radio station. The centre also has a public library and internet cafe.

== Religion ==
Churches in the estate once include, St Michael and All Angels, Church of England on Dinmore Avenue, which was founded in 1958 and Christ the King Roman Catholic on Chepstow Road which was founded in 1949, both of which have now been demolished.

== Grange Park Wildlife Haven ==
Grange Park has a 2-acre (8,100 m^{2}) wildlife conservation area the Genesis Wildlife Haven, where a variety of wildlife can be seen. The area had previously been a wasteland before in 2002 which then a group of children from the local school formed by Mrs Susan Barnes "Christ the King Wildlife Support Group" cleaned up the area. A nature conservation area was created for the benefit of local school children and community. A variety of birds have been seen at the haven including blue tit, great tit, European greenfinch, blackbird, blackcap, common chaffinch, house sparrow, jay, kestrel, pied wagtail, robin, song thrush, sparrowhawk and woodpigeon. In May 2007, pupils from Christ the King school built a small pond in the haven.
