= Ramper Road railway station =

Station in Lancashire, England

Ramper Road
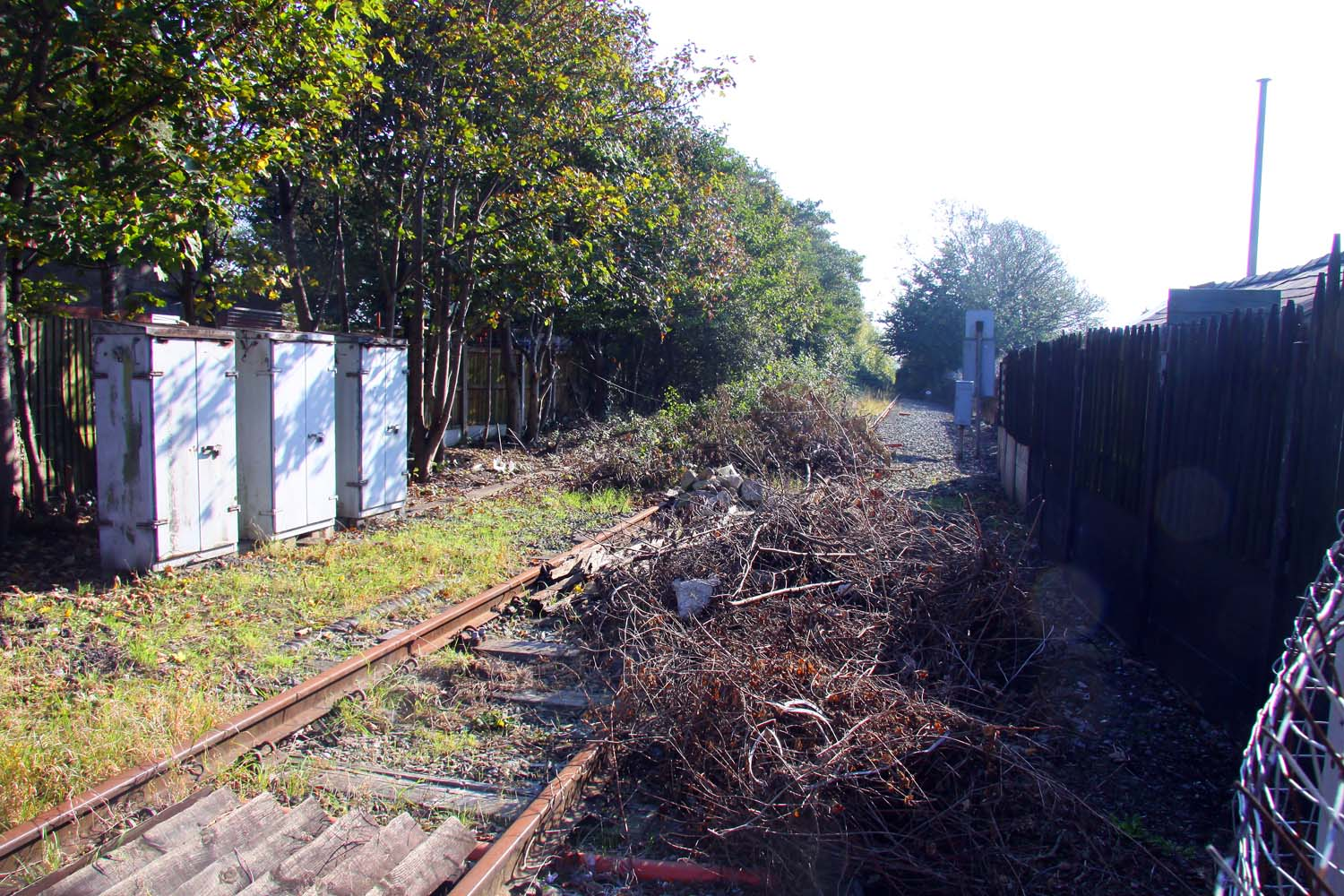
- The former site of the halt, pictured in 2010

General information
- Location: Thornton, Wyre; England
- Coordinates: 53.870118°N 2.999875°W

Other information
- Status: Disused

History
- Original company: Preston and Wyre Joint Railway
- Pre-grouping: Preston and Wyre Joint Railway
- Post-grouping: London, Midland and Scottish Railway

Key dates
- 1842: Station opened
- 1943: Station closed
Location
- Location within the Borough of Wyre Location within Lancashire

Ramper Road was a railway station in Lancashire, England, which served the village of Thornton and town of Cleveleys. Located on the now-disused Fleetwood branch line between Poulton-le-Fylde and Fleetwood, in the 1860s and early 1870s the line was of great importance, being the direct route from London to Glasgow. The line was originally owned by Preston and Wyre Joint Railway (founded in 1839), which became part of London, Midland and Scottish Railway (1923–1947). The station opened in 1842 and closed, due to lack of use, just over a century later. The halt was located immediately to the south of Victoria Road, but was relocated to the northern side (as Thornton–Cleveleys railway station) due to the train's carriages blocking the road traffic when the train stopped at the halt.

Before the Shap route was opened, passengers (allegedly including Queen Victoria) would travel from Euston to Fleetwood and then onwards via steamer to Scotland.

The station was named for Ramper Road, an early name of Victoria Road, which runs between Thornton and Cleveleys.

Preceding station	Disused railways	Following station
Thornton–Cleveleys	Preston and Wyre; Joint Railway; Fleetwood Branch Line	Poulton-le-Fylde
Thornton–Cleveleys	Preston and Wyre; Joint Railway; Blackpool Branch Line	Poulton Curve Halt
