= Layton railway station (England) =

Railway station in Lancashire, England

Layton
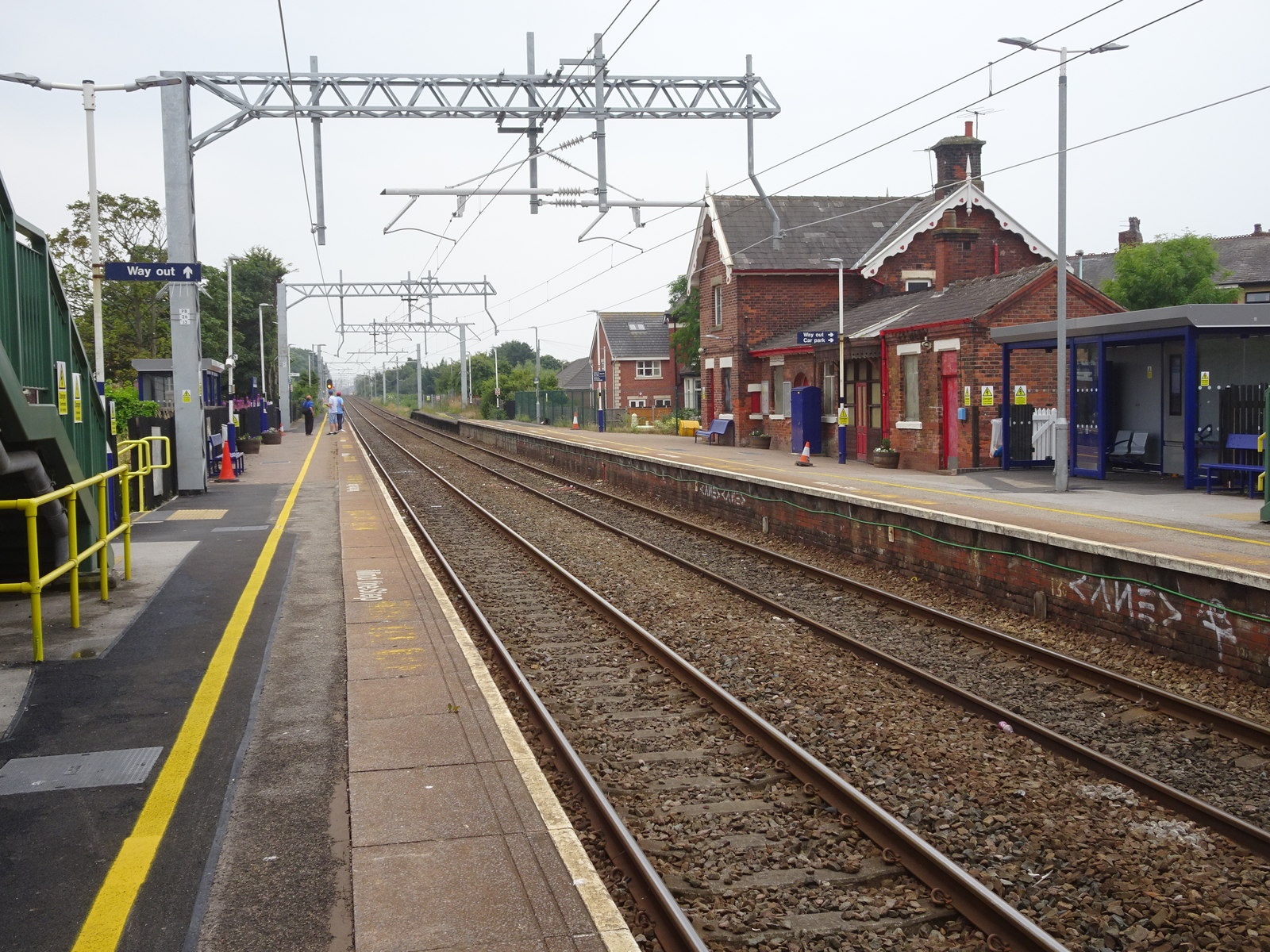

General information
- Location: Layton, Borough of Blackpool, England
- Coordinates: 53.8350°N 3.0306°W
- Grid reference: SD322381
- Managed by: Northern Trains
- Platforms: 2

Other information
- Station code: LAY
- Classification: DfT category F2

History
- Original company: Preston and Wyre Joint Railway
- Pre-grouping: Preston and Wyre Joint Railway
- Post-grouping: London Midland and Scottish Railway

Key dates
- May 1867: Opened as Bispham
- 4 July 1938: Renamed Layton (Lancs)

Passengers
- 2020/21: ▼22,536
- 2021/22: ▲52,714
- 2022/23: ▲63,394
- 2023/24: ▲73,734
- 2024/25: ▲74,558
Location
Notes
- Passenger statistics from the Office of Rail and Road

Layton (formerly Bispham) is a railway station that serves the Blackpool suburbs of Layton and Bispham, in Lancashire, England. It is a stop on the northern Blackpool branch line. It is managed by Northern Trains and is unstaffed.

== History ==
The railway line to Blackpool North, which was originally a branch from the line between Preston and Fleetwood, was opened by the Preston and Wyre Railway (PWR) on 29 April 1846. The PWR was taken over jointly by the Lancashire and Yorkshire Railway (LYR) and the London and North Western Railway (LNWR) in 1849; its title was amended to Preston and Wyre Joint Railway (PWJR). When the station at Layton was opened by the PWJR in May 1867, it was named Bispham. It was renamed Layton (Lancs) on 4 July 1938.

Prior to and during World War II, the station had extensive sidings for goods wagons. Some served the Crossley Bros sawmill which occupied the site of today's retail development, and others served the borough council's transport depot on Depot Road.

A new overbridge was opened to the public on 15 July 2011.

== Facilities ==
The station's ticket office was closed in May 1994. Now unstaffed, it has a digital information screen to supply train running information. There is a 23 space car park and bicycle storage. Step-free access is available to the two platforms.

== Services ==
Northern Trains' typical off-peak service in trains per hour is:

- 1tph to Blackpool North
- 1tph to Manchester Airport, via Preston, Bolton and Manchester Piccadilly.

Preceding station	National Rail	Following station
Blackpool North	Northern Trains Blackpool North to Manchester Airport; Blackpool branch line (Northern)	Poulton-le-Fylde
	Disused railways	
Blackpool North	Preston and Wyre Joint Railway; Fleetwood Branch Line	Poulton Curve Halt
Blackpool North	Preston and Wyre Joint Railway; Blackpool Branch Line	Poulton-le-Fylde

== See also ==
- Public transport in the Fylde
