= Singleton Bank rail crash =

Railway crash in England

Coordinates: 53.8076°N 2.9500°W

Details
- Date: 16 July 1961; 64 years ago
- Location: Weeton, Lancashire
- Country: England
- Line: Fleetwood Branch Line
- Cause: Signaller error; site staff error

Statistics
- Trains: 2
- Deaths: 7
- Injured: 116

The Singleton Bank rail crash occurred on 16 July 1961 near Weeton, Lancashire, England.

== Events ==
The 8:50 diesel multiple unit train from Colne to Fleetwood collided with the rear of a ballast train at about 45 miles per hour (72 km/h). The latter had been working in the vicinity of Singleton Bank signal box and was about to leave to clear the section for the express.

== Victims ==
Seven were killed (the driver and six passengers) and 116 were injured.

== Report ==
The signalman at Singleton misunderstood a telephone message which led him to make a serious error and accept the diesel train irregularly. The accident report also strongly criticised the local inspectors for allowing poor working practices.
