= The Burn Naze (public house) =

Pub in Lancashire, England

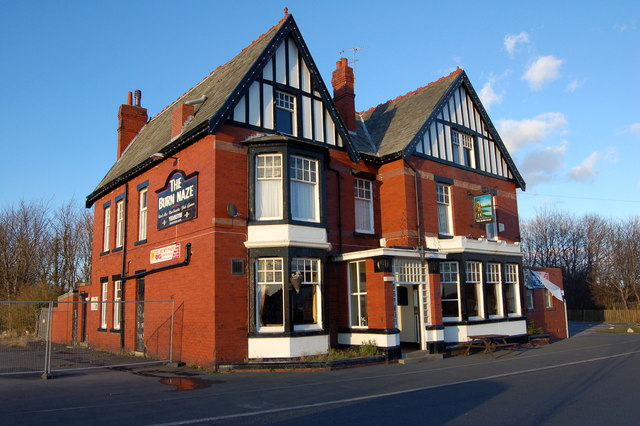
- The building in 2006, during a period of closure

- Location within the Borough of Wyre

General information
- Type: Public house
- Location: Butts Road, Thornton-Cleveleys, Lancashire, England
- Coordinates: 53.8875°N 3.0071°W
- Completed: 1910
- Closed: 2019
- Demolished: 2022 (4 years ago)

Technical details
- Floor count: 3

The Burn Naze was a public house in Burn Naze, Lancashire. Built in 1910, when it replaced the former Burn Naze Inn, it was one of the oldest pubs in the area by the time of its closure in 2019, and was listed as a community asset in 2021. It was demolished in 2022.

The pub closed in 2019, having seen its trade decline significantly since the nearby ICI closed in 1992. It was purchased in November 2020 by Manchester-based housing firm Mangrove Estates, which had plans to build a block of 24 apartments at the location. Wyre Borough Council received a planning application to knock down the pub, but the application was rejected after local community group Save the Burn Naze Pub campaigned against the demolition. The developer appealed successfully and resubmitted its plans. The demolition plans were given the green light in October 2021. Demolition started in February 2022.

== See also ==
- Burn Naze Halt railway station
