= Burn Naze =

Coordinates: 53.88535°N 3.01092°W

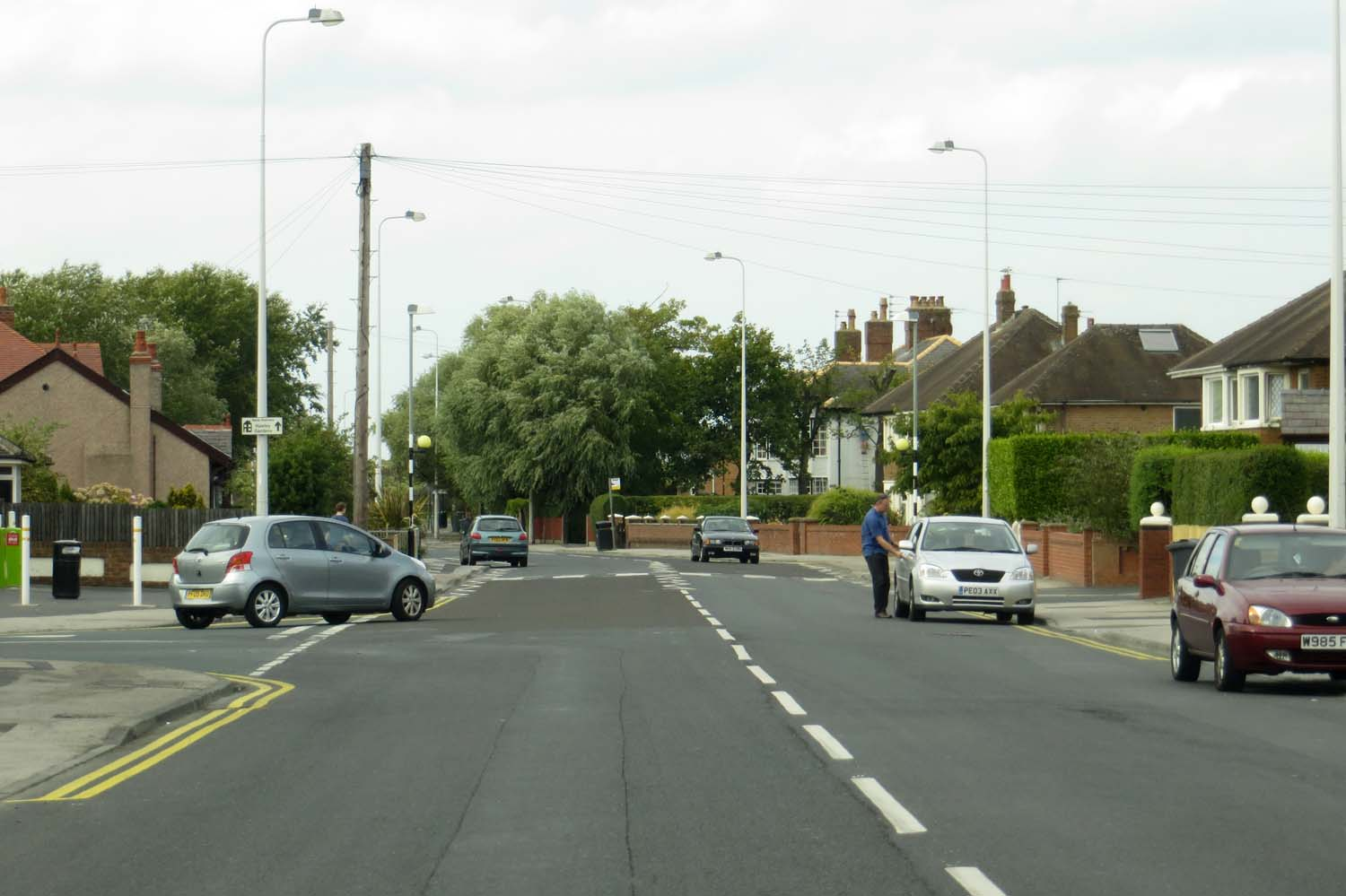
- Fleetwood Road North passing through Burn Naze

- Shown within Wyre Borough Shown on the Fylde Location within Lancashire
- District: Wyre
- Shire county: Lancashire
- Region: North West
- Country: England
- Sovereign state: United Kingdom
- Post town: THORNTON-CLEVELEYS
- Postcode district: FY5
- Dialling code: 01253
- Police: Lancashire
- Fire: Lancashire
- Ambulance: North West
- UK Parliament: Blackpool North and Fleetwood

Burn Naze is a residential area of Thornton-Cleveleys, in the Borough of Wyre, Lancashire, England. It is located about 5 miles (8 km) northeast of Blackpool and 2 miles (3 km) southeast of Fleetwood. Cleveleys is about 1.3 miles (2.1 km) to the west, while the River Wyre is about 0.8 miles (1.3 km) to the east.

Over the course of its history, the Burn Naze name has been used in a railway station and a public house.

The area became heavily populated after ICI Hillhouse, a chlorine-production facility, was built on part of its land in 1941, expanding on a United Alkali Company venture begun in the 1890s. ICI General Chemical Divisions purchased the assets of Hillhouse and Burn Hall Works from the Ministry of Supply. A power plant was built on today's Bourne Way in 1958, providing ICI with electricity and steam power. A railway line—part of the Fleetwood branch line—was built to connect Burn Naze to Poulton-le-Fylde and beyond. The line still exists today, although the sidings at Burn Naze were removed after all freight traffic ceased in 1999.

ICI Hillhouse closed in 1992, and the area subsequently suffered a downturn in fortunes.

== History ==
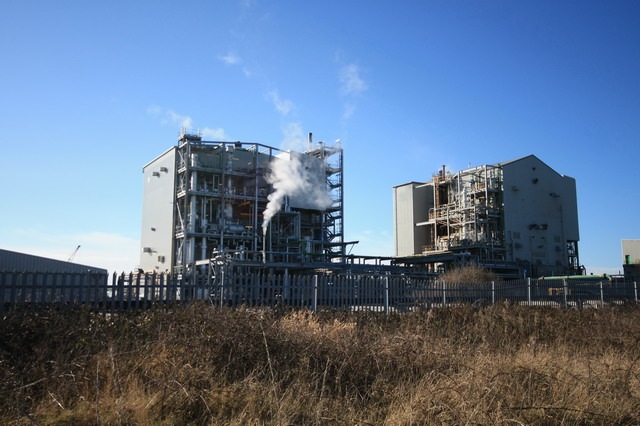
Plastics manufacturing company Victrex built this plant on the former ICI site

The Burn Naze name is possibly derived from when the area was known as "Burn" during the time of William the Conqueror. Torentum, today's Thornton, was "estimated to contain six carucates of land fit for the plough, but this computation was exclusive of Rossall and Burn, which were valued at two carucates respectively". "Naze", meanwhile, is "a flat marshy headland". A Burn Naze is mentioned in 1837 by William Thornber, who was on his way to the nearby River Wyre. A 15th-century building known as Burn Hall also existed in the area, with an earlier structure documented back to at least 1345.

In A History of Lancashire, there is a reference that Burn Naze might have previously been spelled Bourne Naze. A Bourne Road today runs between Amounderness Way and West Road, in the bounds of Burn Naze. Houses built for the workers of ICI still stand on Butts Road and Rock Street.

== Amenities ==
Burn Naze Halt railway station served the village between 1909 and 1970. In spring 2013, the Poulton & Wyre Railway Society were granted an extension to their licence from Network Rail to work on the trackbed, covering the whole branch from Poulton. They then began work on clearing the platforms at Burn Naze Station. As of February 2014, fifteen years after the line closed to all traffic, the station has been cleared extensively and the society are continuing their clearance work ready for the line to reopen.

The Burn Naze public house was in business between 1910 and 2019. It replaced an earlier establishment named the Burn Naze Inn. The Burn Naze was demolished in 2022. Another pub, the Knife and Dagger (also known as the Burn Naze Club), had closed either by the time of ICI's opening in the mid-1940s or just after it.

== Sport ==
Thornton Cleveleys Football Club was formerly based at Bourne Park in Burn Naze, but after twenty years they moved to Gamble Road, adjacent to Fleetwood Town F.C.'s training facility, Poolfoot Farm, which is located to the south.
