= Singleton railway station =

Singleton railway station may refer to any of a number of railway stations.

In England:

- Singleton railway station (Lancashire)
- Singleton railway station (West Sussex)

In Australia:

- Singleton railway station, New South Wales
