= Thornton–Cleveleys railway station =

Station in Lancashire, UK (1865–1970)

Thornton–Cleveleys
- The station around 1900, looking north. The signal box, at right, was removed in the late 1980s

General information
- Other names: Thornton for Cleveleys; Cleveleys
- Location: Thornton, Wyre; England
- Coordinates: 53.8706°N 3.0000°W
- Grid reference: SD343421
- Platforms: 2

Other information
- Status: Disused

History
- Original company: Preston and Wyre Joint Railway
- Pre-grouping: Preston and Wyre Joint Railway
- Post-grouping: London, Midland and Scottish Railway

Key dates
- April 1865: Station opened as Cleveleys
- 1 April 1905: Renamed Thornton for Cleveleys
- 1927: resited
- February 1953: Renamed Thornton–Cleveleys
- 1 June 1970: Station closed
- 1999: The last freight train passes through
- July 2007: Station leased to Poulton & Wyre Railway Society
- 28 February 2020: British Prime Minister Boris Johnson visits the station and pledges to re-open the line
Location
- Location within the Borough of Wyre Location within Lancashire

Thornton–Cleveleys (also known as Thornton for Cleveleys; originally simply named Cleveleys) was a railway station in England which served the Lancashire village of Thornton and town of Cleveleys. Located on the now-disused line between Poulton-le-Fylde and Fleetwood, the station also had a shunting yard for the making-up of freight trains for Preston and beyond. In the 1860s and early 1870s, the line was of great importance, being the direct route from London to Glasgow. Before the Shap route was opened, passengers (allegedly including Queen Victoria) would travel from Euston to Fleetwood and then onwards via steamer to Scotland.

The original station was opened in April 1865, and was named Cleveleys. It was to the south of Station Road in Thornton, near an older halt called Ramper Road (an old name for the nearby Victoria Road). The station master's house and station building can still be seen in use as a private residence. The station was renamed Thornton for Cleveleys on 1 April 1905.

In July 1920, the first bus service was added to Blackpool Corporation's operations, running to the station from Cleveleys.

This station closed in 1927, when the new station (the first to be built by London, Midland and Scottish Railway) opened to the north of the level crossing. In February 1953, the station was renamed again, this time to Thornton–Cleveleys. Rationalised in the 1950s and 1960s, and affected by the ending of the ferry from Fleetwood to the Isle of Man, the station eventually closed on 1 June 1970, when the Fleetwood line was closed to passengers. Station Road's signal box was removed in the late 1980s. Freight continued on the line to nearby Burn Naze until 1999.

== Preservation undertaking ==
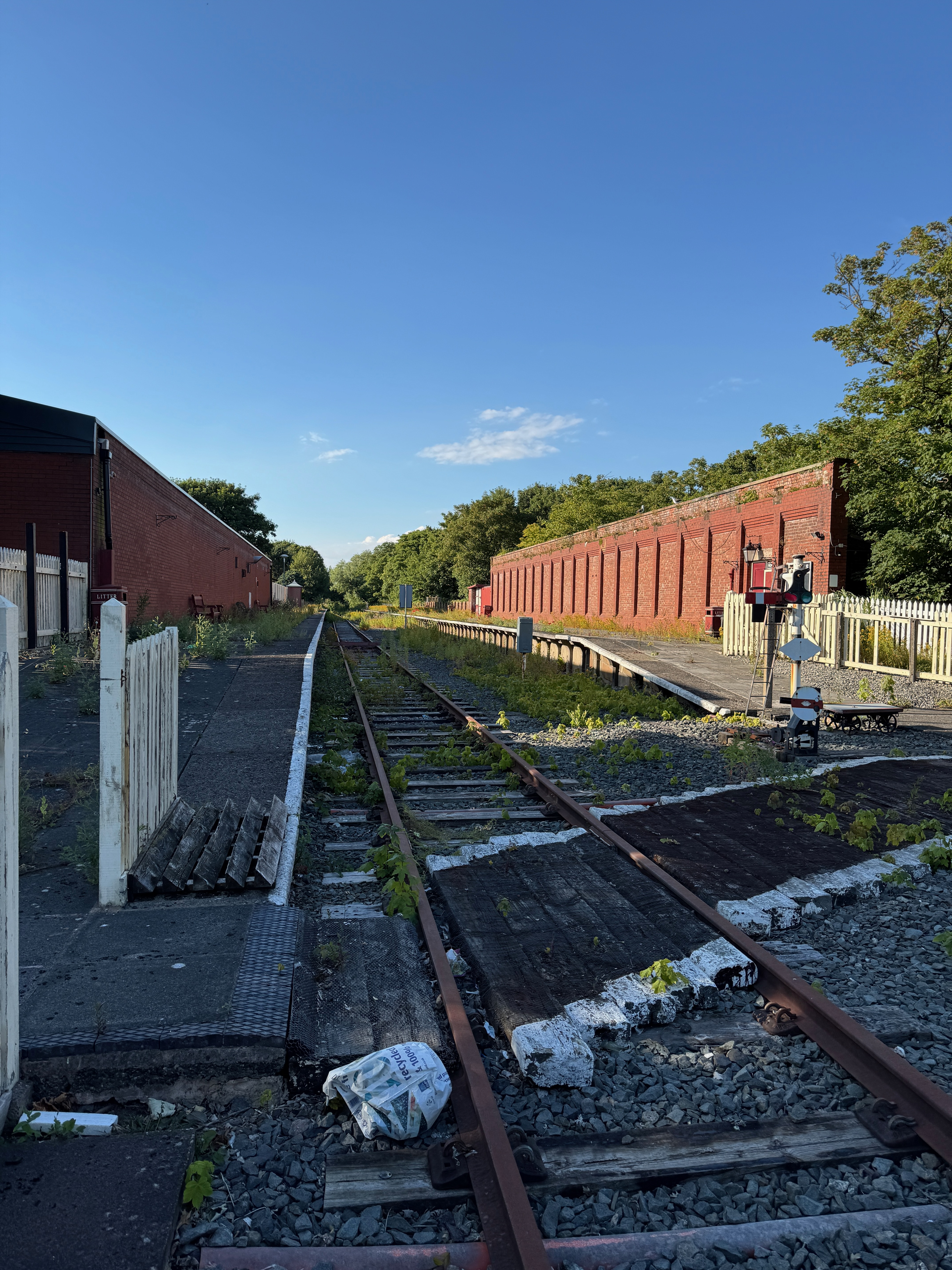
The station from Station Road level crossing in 2024, at which point its upkeep was in a period of inactivity

Today, the majority of the buildings at the station have long since been demolished, but the platforms remain, along with one of the original walls used to support the station's canopy and the bases for the waiting rooms on the up platform.

The site of the main station buildings and bus turning circle are now the site of a supermarket and small shops, narrowing the original down platform by a small amount.

On 1 July 2007, the station was leased by Network Rail to the Poulton & Wyre Railway Society to allow the group of volunteers access to the site to return the station to a restored condition.

Extensive improvements have occurred since the Poulton & Wyre Railway Society have been working on the station, with the site cleared of vegetation and almost all the fences rebuilt in a traditional picket fence style; the society has also resurfaced the down platform.

In April 2013, the society was granted permission to extend their licence and begin work on the next station along the line towards Fleetwood, at Burn Naze. A large hurdle was the section just short of Fleetwood that had been built over by the A585. An alternative route into Fleetwood was not obvious, at least in early 2020.

On 28 February 2020, British prime minister Boris Johnson made an unannounced visit to the station during the country's election campaign, and three months before the 50th anniversary of the last passengers arriving there. Johnson invited local councillor Brian Crawford onto the tracks for a private word. When Johnson asked what Crawford needed, he replied that £100,000 was necessary for an initial feasibility study. Johnson granted the request, and said he wanted the station to reopen before the next election, which was due in 2024. The line was one of several chosen as part of a policy to "Reverse Beeching" (see Beeching cuts).

The study, completed in 2021, found that the line could be reopened for heavy rail, to integrate with the national rail network. It confirmed it could also be used for ‘light’ rail, as an extension of the Blackpool Tram route, or as a cross system using vehicles which could operate on both heavy and light rail systems. The study also found that reopening the link would propose an 11-minute journey from Fleetwood to Poulton, and 28 minutes from Fleetwood to Preston. A journey which currently takes an hour by public transport.

| Preceding station | Disused railways | Following station |
|---|---|---|
| Burn Naze Halt | Preston and Wyre; Joint Railway; Fleetwood Branch Line | Poulton-le-Fylde |
| Burn Naze Halt | Preston and Wyre; Joint Railway; Blackpool Branch Line | Poulton Curve Halt |
