= ICI Hillhouse =

Former production plant in Lancashire, England

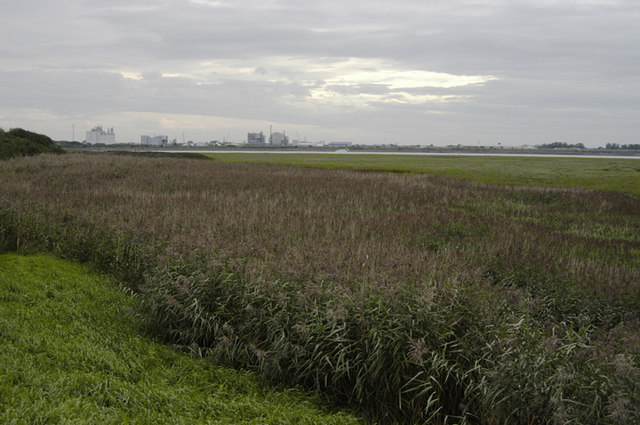
- Looking southwest to the former works from Burrow's Marsh in Staynall in 2008

- Location within Lancashire
- Built: 1941
- Location: Thornton-Cleveleys and Burn Naze, Lancashire, England
- Coordinates: 53.882483°N 2.9978532°W
- Industry: Chlorine production
- Defunct: 1992 (34 years ago)

ICI Hillhouse was a chlorine-production facility in Lancashire, England. A division of Imperial Chemical Industries (ICI), it was active between 1941 and 1992. Its triangular footprint spread from the banks of the River Wyre at Stanah in the east, to Hillylaid Road in the southwest, to the southern edge of Fleetwood in the north. Its entrances were on Hillylaid Road (via the extant gate at the end of today's The Hawthorns) and on Butts Road in Burn Naze. Burn Naze Halt railway station served those arriving by train.

ICI Hillhouse expanded on a United Alkali Company venture begun in 1890. ICI General Chemical Divisions purchased the assets of Hillhouse and Burn Hall Works from the Ministry of Supply. A power plant was built on today's Bourne Way in 1958, providing ICI with electricity and steam power. A railway line—part of the Fleetwood branch line—was built to connect Burn Naze to Poulton-le-Fylde and beyond. The line still exists today, although the sidings at Burn Naze were removed after all freight traffic ceased in 1999.

Water from the Lancaster Canal, beside Nateby Hall bridge, was extracted by ICI Hillhouse via a 25-year lease. Around 6,000 megalitres (1.3 million gallons) of water was obtained. The boreholes the facility previously used resulted in the water turning brackish due to a fault line which runs between Barrow-in-Furness and the Fylde.

ICI Hillhouse closed in 1992, after which the Burn Naze area, where most of the workers lived, subsequently suffered a downturn in fortunes. The chlorine plant was demolished in 1994. The power station was demolished in 2007; its chimney followed on 7 November 2009.

In 1999, Glasgow-based NPL Estates reached a £50 million agreement with ICI to create new housing, leisure, supermarket and shopping facilities on the Burn Naze portion of the land. Another section became the Hillhouse Enterprise Zone.

A plaque beside the Thornton-Cleveleys War Memorial at Four Lane Ends honours ICI Hillhouse workers who served in the first and second World Wars. Poulton & Wyre Railway Society have placed a plaque honouring the wars' soldiers at Burn Naze Halt.

== Fire ==
On 26 July 1963, a fire broke out in an electric furnace at ICI Hillhouse. The furnace was used to heat anthracite to make carbide electro paste. While local brigades (Blackpool and Lancashire) also attended, the fire was fought by the on-site ICI Works fire brigade. A rush of flames injured seven firefighters, with Raymond Pearson, 40, dying a day later in hospital.

== See also ==
- Hillylaid Pool, which runs along the western side of the facility
