= Hillylaid Pool =

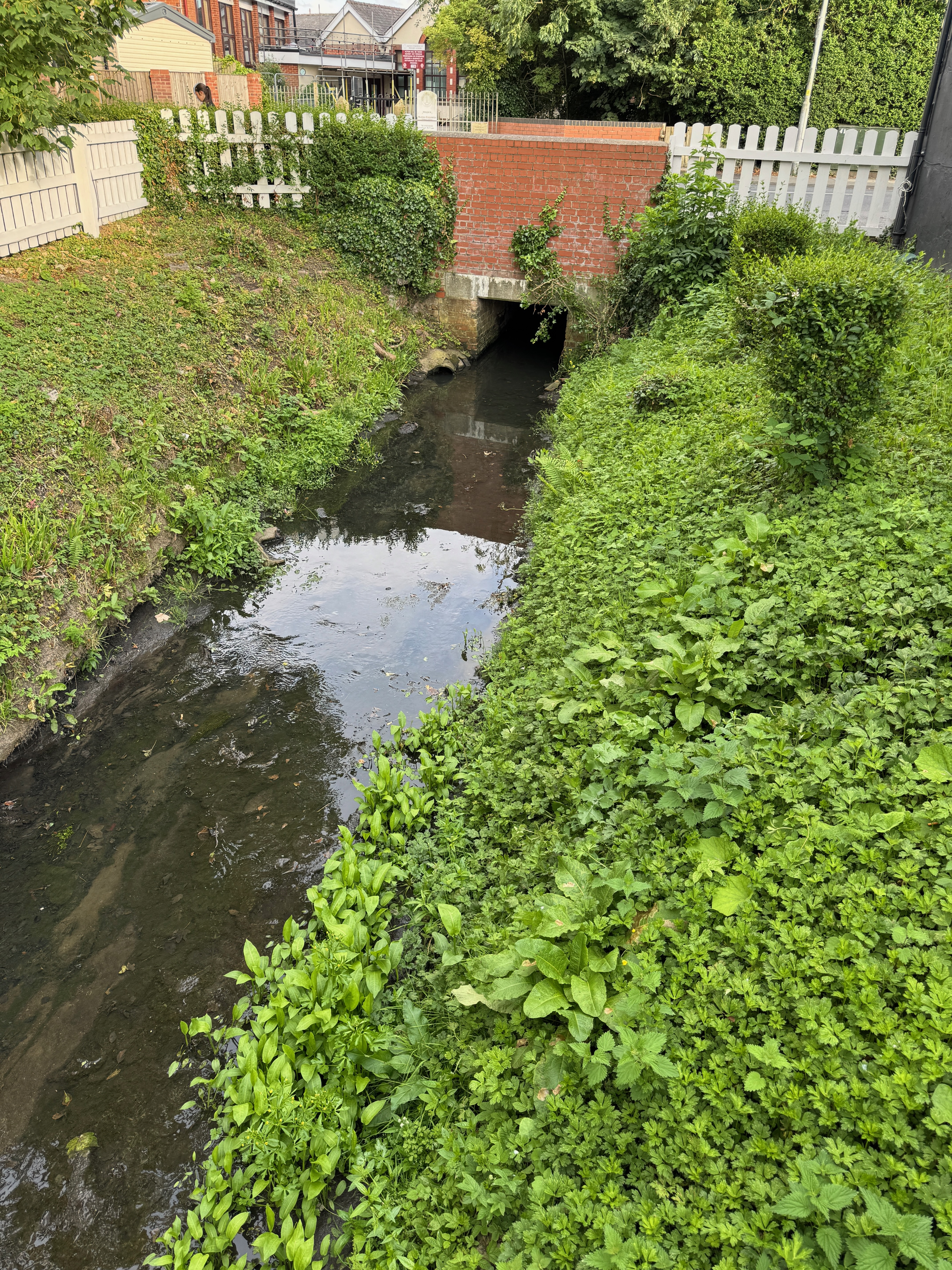
- Looking upstream as Hillylaid Pool passes beneath Station Road in Thornton

- Location of the mouth within Wyre Borough

Location
- Country: England
- County: Lancashire

Physical characteristics
- Mouth: River Wyre
  - location: Thornton
  - coordinates: 53°52′53″N 2°58′41″W
- Length: 4.55 mi (7.32 km)

Hillylaid Pool (known colloquially as The Dyke) is a water channel running through the Fylde and Wyre areas of Lancashire in England. It is 4.55 miles (7.32 km) long, and it is part of the Fleetwood Peninsula Tributary catchment area.

Hillylaid Pool is sourced from a pond near the junction of Blackpool Road and Blackpool Old Road in Poulton-le-Fylde. It joins the River Wyre at Stanah, shortly after merging with another watercourse to the northwest of Flint's Caravan Park.

It has the ability to be pumped at high tide by a pumping station on River Road, beside the entrance to Wyre Estuary Country Park.

It was the subject of Wyre River Trust's Hillylaid Pool Wetland Project in 2018. The wetlands were created on the banks of the Wyre at Stanah in 2020, a combined effort of The Rivers Trust and Wyre Rivers Trust.

A wetland area was created within the former site of ICI Hillhouse in Thornton. 6,000 cubic metres (210,000 cu ft) of water can now be stored there, allowing capacity during periods of heavy rainfall and providing habitats for wildlife. Hillylaid Pool was straightened in the 1970s, leaving a stagnant paleochannel; this project reconnected the old channel to the existing watercourse.

== Gallery ==
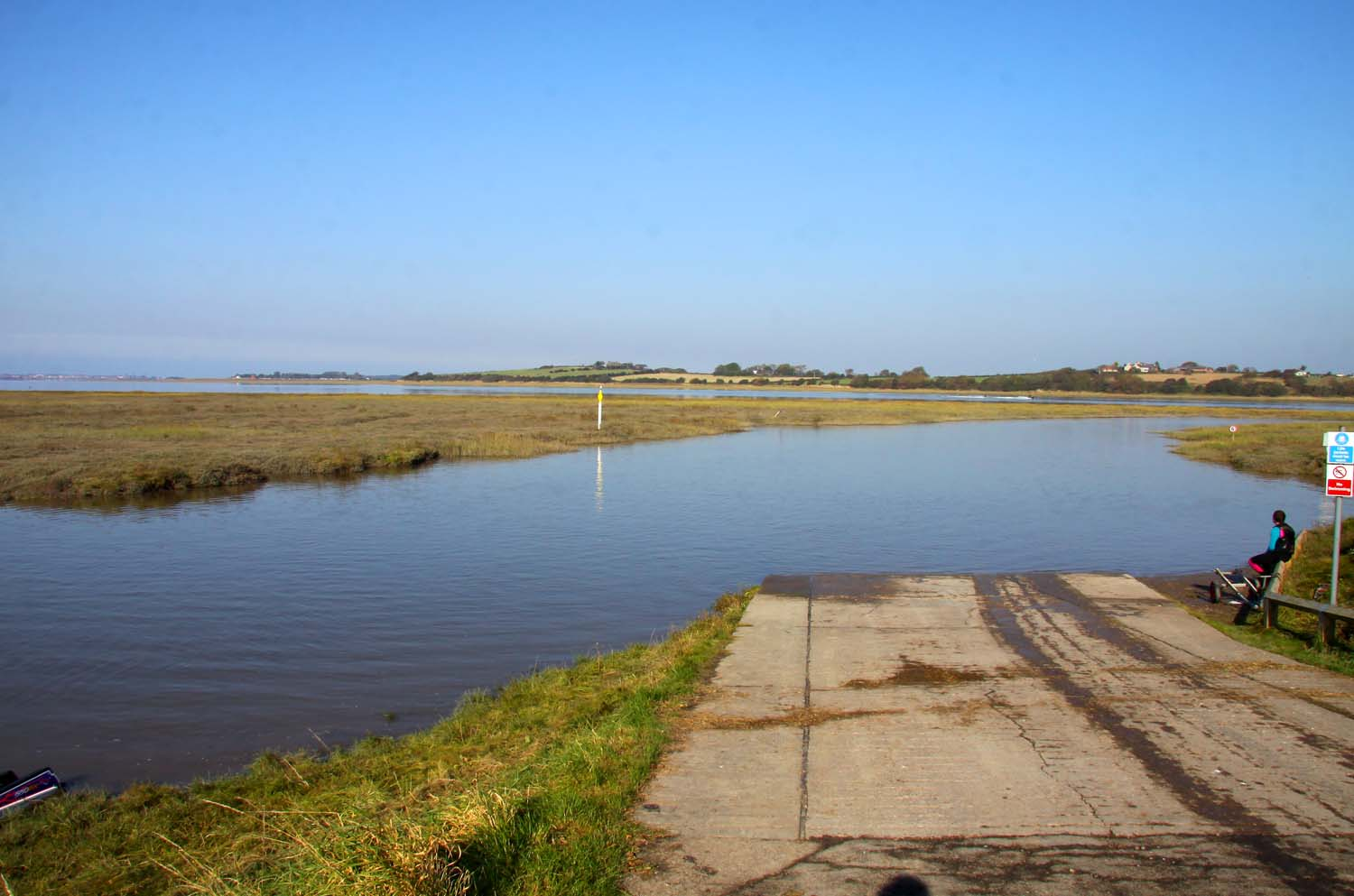
Boats are launched into the final few yards of Hillylaid Pool at Wyre Estuary Country Park
