= Wyre Dock railway station =

Station in Fleetwood, UK (1885–1970)

Wyre Dock

General information
- Location: Wyre Dock, Fleetwood, Wyre; England
- Coordinates: 53.9192°N 3.0142°W
- Platforms: 2

Other information
- Status: Disused

History
- Original company: Lancashire and Yorkshire Railway / London and North Western Railway
- Pre-grouping: LYR / LNWR

Key dates
- 1885: Opened as "Wyre Dock"
- 18 April 1966: Renamed "Fleetwood"
- 1 June 1970: Closed
Location
- Location within Fleetwood Location within the Borough of Wyre Location within Lancashire

Wyre Dock railway station served Fleetwood in Lancashire, England, from 1885 to 1970.

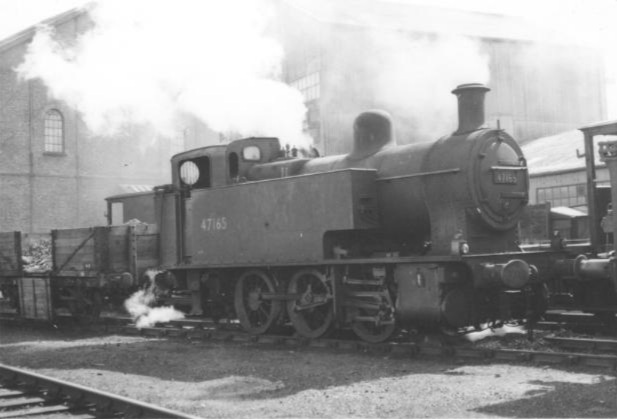
The goods branch into the docks was shunted by small locomotives, latterly by the LMS Fowler Dock Tanks. 47165 is in steam at Fleetwood in 1958

Wyre Dock passenger station was constructed in 1885, on the Fleetwood Branch Line from Poulton-le-Fylde, about half a mile from the Fleetwood main terminus. The station stood at the southern end of Dock Street, about a quarter mile from Wyre Dock itself. There had been a branch line for freight only to Wyre Dock since its construction in 1877, to support the distribution of fish. Fleetwood locomotive depot was located on the east side of the line south of the station. It was closed by British Railways in 1965.

Fleetwood's main terminus was closed on 18 April 1966, as a result of the Beeching Cuts, and Wyre Dock was renamed "Fleetwood" station, as the terminus of the Fleetwood Branch Line. However, all passenger services between Poulton-le-Fylde and Fleetwood were withdrawn after the last train on 30 May 1970, and the station was demolished. Light industry developed in the area, and, in the 1990s, the new A585 Amounderness Way bypass was built on the former railway route.

== Notes ==
Preceding station	Disused railways	Following station
Fleetwood until 1966	LNWR / LYR; Fleetwood Branch Line	Burn Naze Halt
Terminus after 1966	London Midland Region; Fleetwood Branch Line	Burn Naze Halt
