= Fleetwood power stations =

20th-century English power stations

- Country: England
- Location: Fleetwood
- Coordinates: 53°55′01″N 03°01′10″W
- Status: Decommissioned and demolished
- Commission date: 1900 (first station); 1955 (second station)
- Decommission date: ? (first station); 1981 (second station)
- Owners: Fleetwood and District Electric Light and Power Syndicate Limited (1896–c.1917); Fleetwood Urban District Council (c.1917–1948); British Electricity Authority (1948–1955); Central Electricity Authority (1955–1957); Central Electricity Generating Board (1958–1981)
- Operator: As owner

Thermal power station
- Primary fuel: Coal
- Turbine technology: Steam turbines
- Cooling towers: 2
- Cooling source: Estuary water and cooling towers

Power generation
- Units operational: 3 x 30 MW
- Make and model: English Electric
- Nameplate capacity: 90 MW
- Annual net output: 408.4 MWh (1962)

Fleetwood power stations were two generating stations that supplied electricity to the town of Fleetwood, England and the surrounding area from 1900 to 1981. The first station was owned by the Fleetwood and District Electric Light and Power Syndicate and later by Fleetwood Urban District Council. The second station was owned and operated by the state following the nationalisation of the British electricity supply industry in 1948; this power station was decommissioned in October 1981.

== History ==
In 1890 the Fleetwood Urban District Council applied for a provisional order under the Electric Lighting Acts to generate and supply electricity to the town. The Fleetwood Electric Lighting Order 1890 was granted by the Board of Trade and was confirmed by Parliament through the Electric Lighting Orders Confirmation (No. 2) Act 1890 (53 & 54 Vict. c. cxxxvii). However, no scheme was built. In 1896 the council transferred the provisional order to the Fleetwood and District Electric Light and Power Syndicate Limited. The syndicate was registered on 9 October 1896. The council retained the right to purchase the undertaking at the end of 21 years and at 7-yearly intervals thereafter.

The power station was built in Copse Road Fleetwood (53°55′01″N 3°01′10″W).

== Equipment specification ==
By 1923 the urban district council were operating the station. Generating plant comprised:

- Coal-fired boilers generating steam at up to 45,000 lb/h (5.67 kg/s) steam was supplied to:
- Generators
  - 1 × 120 kW reciprocating engine driving a generator
  - 1 × 300 kW reciprocating engine driving a generator
  - 1 × 540 kW steam turbo-generator

These machines gave a total generating capacity of 960 kW of direct current.

Consumer electricity supplies were 400 & 200 Volts DC.

Coal was delivered to a dedicated railway siding.

=== Second station 1955–1981 ===
The new power station was sanctioned by the British Electricity Authority in June 1950. The first generating set was commissioned in May 1955, the second in August 1955 and the third set in December 1955. The plant comprised:

- 3 × 300,000 lb/h (37.8 kg/s) boilers, steam conditions 625 psi and 865 °F (43.1 bar, 463 °C). Pulverised fuel firing. No. 1 and No. 2 boilers by Simon-Carves, No. 3 boiler by Richardsons-Westgarth.
- 3 × English Electric 30 MW turbo-alternators, generating at 11.8 kV.

The total installed generating capacity was 90 MW, with an output capacity of 84 MW.

This station is slightly unusual in that it is built beside the sea and yet has to have recourse to cooling towers as part of the cooling system. The sea at low tide retreats a long way out and the cost of running cooling water pipes sufficiently far out to sea for an adequate supply to be ensured at all states of the tide would have been prohibitive. Instead, the supply is drawn from the fish dock of the port of Fleetwood as make-up water only and a reservoir inside the station area provides a carryover of the cooling water supply for periods of low water level when insufficient quantities can be obtained from the dock. Condenser cooling water was cooled in two 3 million gallons per hour (3.79 m^{3}/s) Fred Mitchell & Son concrete cooling towers, additional water was drawn from the Wyre Dock and reservoir.

== Operations ==
=== Operating data 1921–23 ===
The operating data is shown in the table:

Fleetwood power station operating data 1921–23
Electricity Use	Units	Year		
Electricity Use	Units	1921	1922	1923
Lighting and domestic use	MWh	507	421	440
Public lighting use	MWh	63	64	64
Traction	MWh	83	175	215
Power use	MWh	600	546	683
Total use	MWh	1,253	1,207	1,402
Load and connected load
Maximum load	kW	800	730	745
Total connections	kW	2,776	3,132	3,484
Load factor	Per cent	22.6	24.6	27.6
Financial
Revenue from sales of current	£	–	£22,392	£2,215
Surplus of revenue over expenses	£	–	£7,038	£11,752

Under the terms of the Electricity (Supply) Act 1926 (16 & 17 Geo. 5. c. 51) the Central Electricity Board (CEB) was established in 1926. The CEB identified high efficiency ‘selected’ power stations that would supply electricity most effectively. The CEB also constructed the national grid (1927–33) to provide regional connections between power stations.

The British electricity supply industry was nationalised in 1948 under the provisions of the Electricity Act 1947 (10 & 11 Geo. 6. c. 54). Ownership of power stations and main transmission lines was vested in the British Electricity Authority, and subsequently the Central Electricity Authority and the Central Electricity Generating Board (CEGB). At the same time the electricity distribution and sales responsibilities of local electricity undertakings were transferred to area electricity boards, in Fleetwood this was the North Western Electricity Board (NORWEB).

=== Operating data 1956–79 ===
Operating data is shown in the table:

Fleetwood power station operating data, 1956–79
Year	Running hours or load factor (per cent)	Max output capacity MW	Electricity supplied GWh	Thermal efficiency per cent
1956	4625	84	164.182	25.82
1957	7555	84	337.539	26.11
1958	8029	84	363.388	26.29
1961	(55.4 %)	84	407.782	25.71
1962	(50.4 %)	84	408.407	25.35
1963	(54.67 %)	84	402.251	25.75
1967	(49.8 %)	90	392.248	25.36
1972	(25.7 %)	90	203.524	23.17
1979	(8.3 %)	90	65.364	21.45

The data demonstrates the decline in load factor and electricity supplied in the late 1960s and 1970s.

== Closure ==
Fleetwood power station was decommissioned on 31 October 1981. The buildings were subsequently demolished and the area has been turned into Fleetwood Marsh Nature Reserve.

== See also ==
- Timeline of the UK electricity supply industry
- List of power stations in England
