= Christ Church, Thornton =

Coordinates: 53.8774°N 3.0218°W

Christ Church
- Thornton-le-Fylde Christ Church
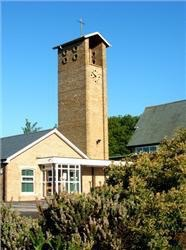

- Location in the Borough of Wyre
- OS grid reference: SD 32921 42838
- Location: Meadows Avenue, Thornton, Lancashire
- Country: England
- Denomination: Anglican
- Churchmanship: Low church
- Website: Thornton-le-Fylde Christ Church

History
- Status: parish church
- Consecrated: 1836

Architecture
- Functional status: Active
- Architect(s): Joseph T. Parkinson; Austin, Paley and Austin; Leach, Rhodes and Walker
- Architectural type: Church
- Style: Gothic Revival, Modern
- Groundbreaking: 1835
- Completed: 1963

Specifications
- Materials: Sandstone

Administration
- Province: Province of York
- Diocese: Diocese of Blackburn
- Archdeaconry: Lancaster archdeaconry
- Deanery: Poulton
- Parish: Thornton-le-Fylde

Clergy
- Priest: Damian Platt

Christ Church is in Meadows Avenue, Thornton, Lancashire, England. It is an active Anglican parish church in the deanery of Poulton, the archdeaconry of Lancaster, and the diocese of Blackburn.

== History ==
Christ Church has been the parish church of Thornton-Cleveleys since 1836. The church was built originally in 1835–37 to a design by Joseph Parkinson. The chancel was added in 1913–14 by the Lancaster architects Austin, Paley and Austin., The (now non-functional) Pipe Organ is by Rushworth & Dreaper of Liverpool and was installed in 1950, In 1963 Leach, Rhodes and Walker rebuilt the nave, added the tower and built parish rooms.

== Architecture ==
Interior

The authors of the Buildings of England series comment that the church and parish rooms have "a mishmash of an exterior". The church is constructed in yellow sandstone with red sandstone dressings. The architectural style is Free Perpendicular. Standing to the southwest of the church are single-storey parish rooms, from which rises a tower with an open bell stage and a saddleback roof. Inside the church is stained glass installed in 1975 and designed by the artist Brian Clarke.

== See also ==
- List of ecclesiastical works by Austin and Paley (1895–1914)
