= Thornton, Lancashire =

Village in Lancashire, England

Coordinates: 53.871°N 3.004°W

Thornton
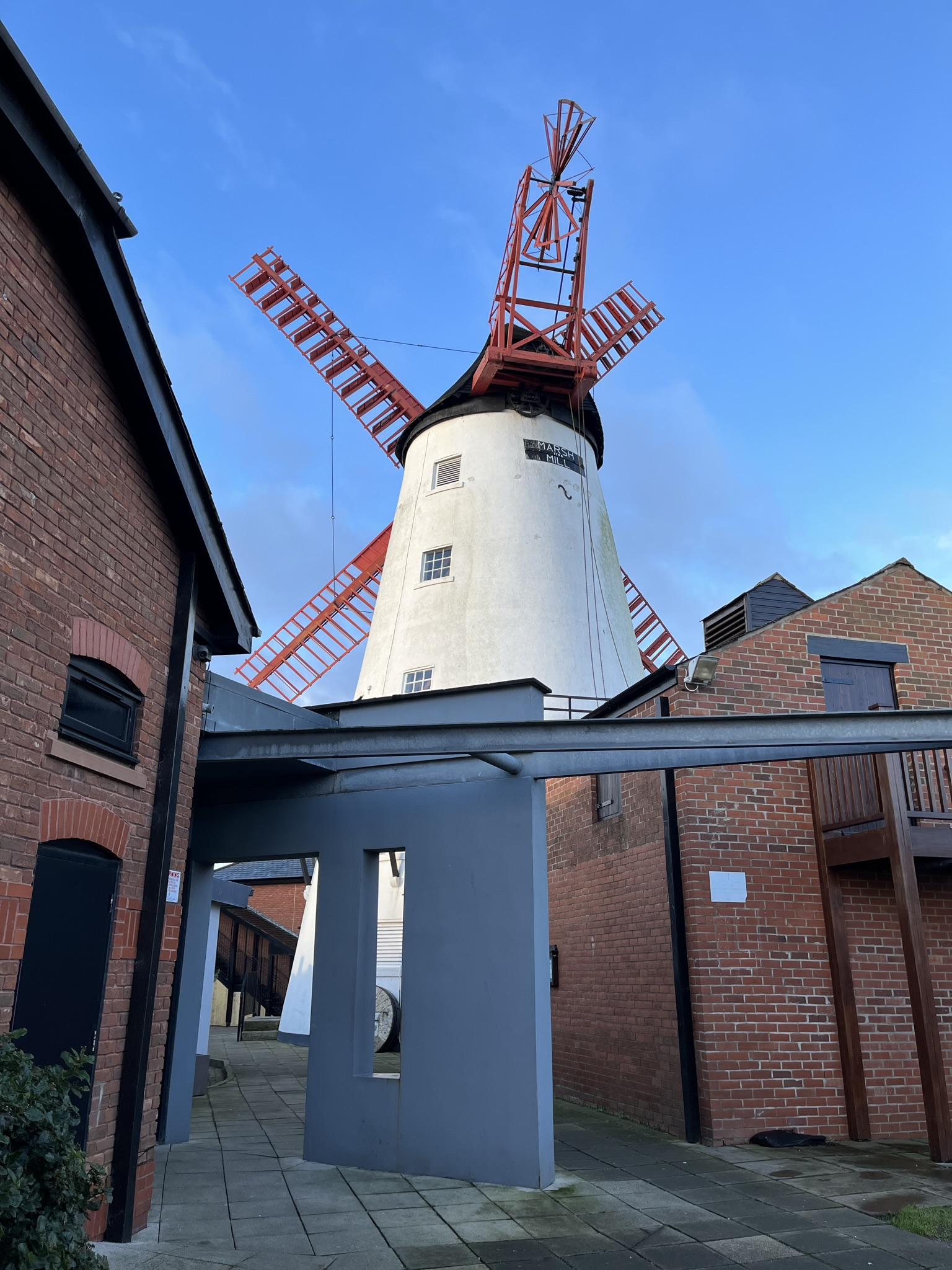
- Marsh Mill, on Fleetwood Road, 2023

- Shown within Wyre Borough Shown on the Fylde Location within Lancashire
- OS grid reference: SD339421
- District: Wyre
- Shire county: Lancashire
- Region: North West
- Country: England
- Sovereign state: United Kingdom
- Post town: THORNTON-CLEVELEYS
- Postcode district: FY5
- Dialling code: 01253
- Police: Lancashire
- Fire: Lancashire
- Ambulance: North West
- UK Parliament: Blackpool North and Fleetwood

Thornton is a village in the Borough of Wyre, about 4 miles (6 km) north of Blackpool and 2 miles (3 km) south of Fleetwood. The civil parish of Thornton became an urban district in 1900, and was renamed Thornton-Cleveleys in 1927. In 2011, the Thornton built-up area sub division had a population of 18,941.

== History ==
Thornton is first mentioned in 1086 in the Domesday Book, in which it was referred to as Torentum (a name preserved by Torentum Court on Lawsons Road). At the time, it covered a large area including what are now Cleveleys and Fleetwood, and had a very low population density. It is thought that a settlement had existed at the site since the Iron Age, and a Roman road passes close to the village. The area remained lightly populated until 1799, when the marshland around the village was drained and agricultural production began on a large scale.

Marsh Mill, a large well-preserved windmill, built in 1794, is a prominent landmark. It was commissioned by Bold Hesketh, uncle of Peter Hesketh (later Peter Hesketh-Fleetwood), who would go on to play a prominent role in the expansion of Fleetwood. Tragedy struck in May 1930, when a Miss Alice Baldwin and a Mrs Mary Jane Bailey visited the windmill with an interest in purchasing it. However, when both women stepped onto the fantail platform, the platform collapsed and the women fell to their deaths.

The opening of salt works at nearby Burn Naze by the United Alkali Company in the early 1890s (later becoming ICI, with ICI Hillhouse being formed) led to significant expansion of the village, with new houses and community buildings constructed. Thornton became an Urban District Council in 1900, surviving until 1974, when it became part of Wyre Borough Council.

A notable early building, The Illawalla, stood in the Skippool area of Thornton between 1902 and 1996.

In 2015, the complete skeleton of a pre-historic wolf, nicknamed the Thornton Wolf, was discovered in the back garden of a home in the village.

== Transport ==
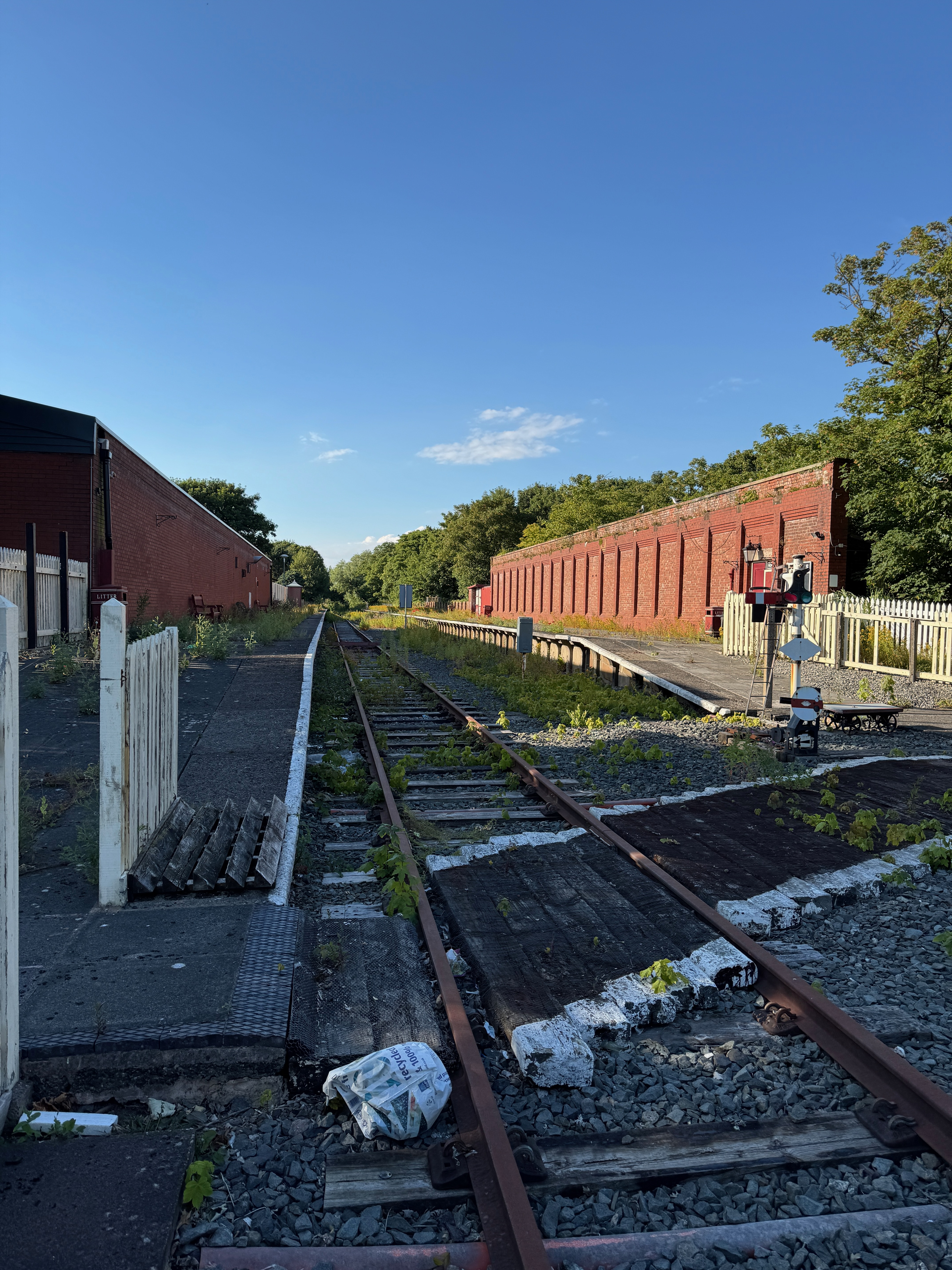
The former site of Thornton for Cleveleys railway station in 2024

A railway station, Thornton for Cleveleys railway station, was opened in Thornton in 1865. It was formerly the principal intermediate stop on the Fleetwood branch of the LMS/British Rail London Midland Region railway, running from Poulton-le-Fylde, but it has been years since the station was used, with the level crossing at Station Road now fenced over; however, a decision by the Poulton & Wyre Railway Society means they will finance a feasibility study into bringing the railway back to Thornton and Fleetwood.

== Amenities ==
Thornton's village shopping precinct opened in 1978. It was replaced by a Co-op in the early 21st century.

Thornton contains a number of schools, including Baines Endowed Primary School, Thornton Primary School, Stanah Primary School, Royles Brook Primary School, Sacred Heart Primary School and Millfield Science & Performing Arts College. The public library, situated at Four Lane Ends, was closed down in the autumn of 2016 as a result of cost-cutting measures by Lancashire County Council. This decision was hugely unpopular, and the library reopened in February 2018 after the decision was reversed.

== Sport ==
Thornton-Cleveleys is home to Thornton-Cleveleys R.U.F.C., who play rugby in the RFU Northern Division, North Lancs 1. Their home ground is the YMCA sports centre on Victoria Road East.

Thornton Cleveleys F.C. play in the North West Counties Football League. Their home matches are played at Gamble Road.

The town boasts two cricket clubs—Thornton-Cleveleys C.C. and Norcross C.C.—both playing in the Moore & Smalley Palace Shield competition and both having three senior sides and several junior teams in a variety of age groups.

Thornton Judo Club was established in 1974, formerly at the sports centre and now at the Scout Hall on Marsh Road. It is a member club of The British Judo Council and The British Judo Association.

== Gallery ==
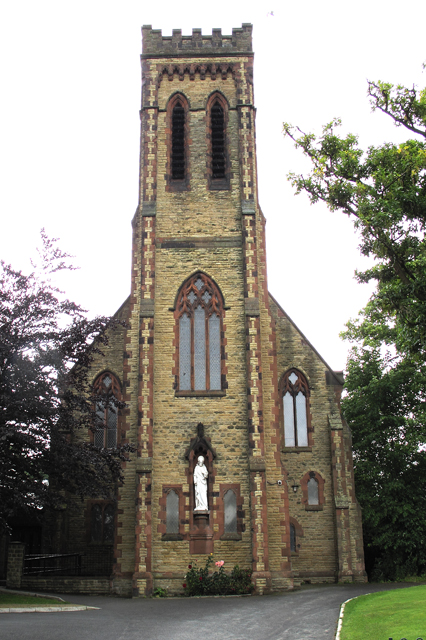
Sacred Heart Roman Catholic Church

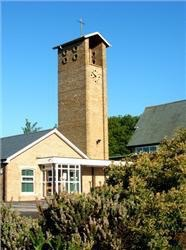
Christ Church, parish church

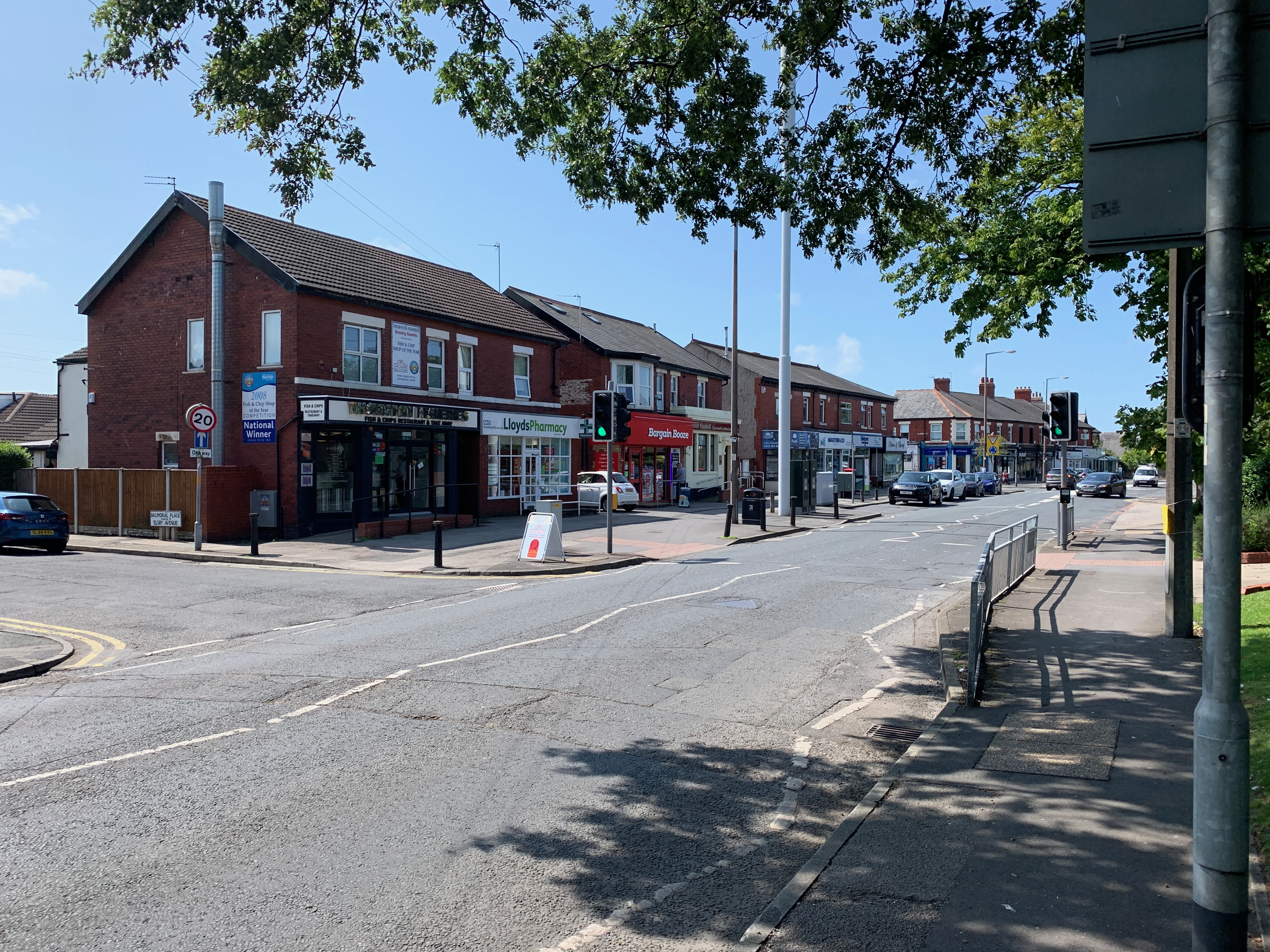
Shops on Victoria Road East in the village centre

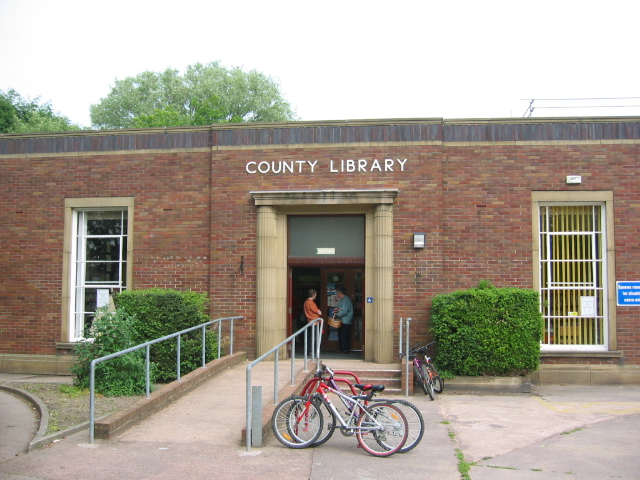
County library, Four Lane Ends

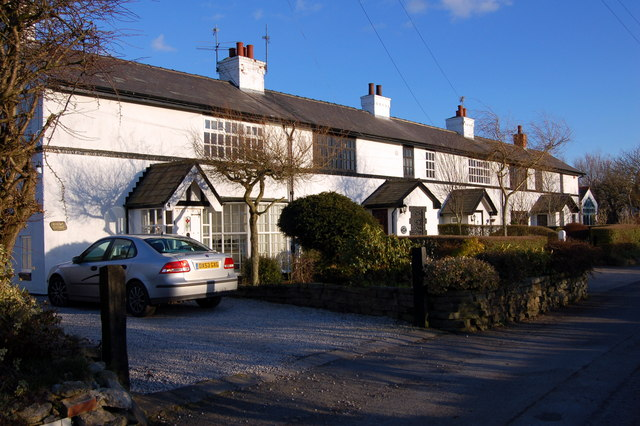
Rows of cottages on Thornton's Underbank Road

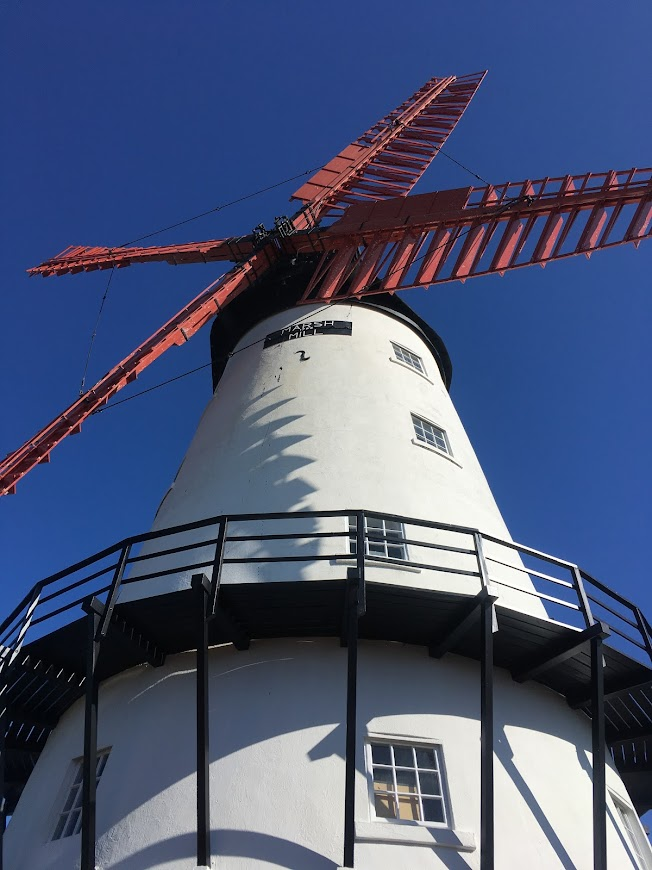
Marsh Mill

== See also ==
- Listed buildings in Thornton-Cleveleys
