= Singleton railway station (Lancashire) =

Former railway station in England

Singleton
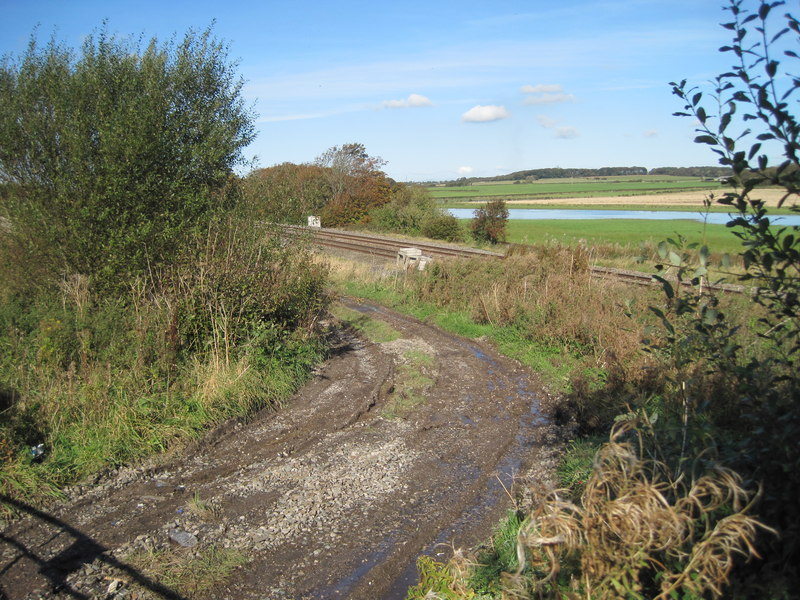
- Site of the former station (2012)

General information
- Location: Singleton, Fylde; England
- Coordinates: 53.8242°N 2.9607°W
- Platforms: 2

Other information
- Status: Disused

History
- Original company: Preston and Wyre Joint Railway
- Pre-grouping: Lancashire and Yorkshire Railway / London and North Western Railway
- Post-grouping: London, Midland and Scottish Railway

Key dates
- 1870: Opened
- 2 May 1932: Closed
Location

Singleton railway station served the village of Singleton in Lancashire, England.

== History ==
The station was opened by the Preston and Wyre Joint Railway in 1870 and closed in 1932. It has been completely demolished since.

== Incidents ==
A serious accident occurred at Singleton Bank, south of the station, in 1961, killing seven and injuring 116.

== Route ==
Preceding station	Disused railways	Following station
Poulton-le-Fylde	Preston and Wyre; Joint Railway	Kirkham & Wesham
