= Poulton & Wyre Railway Society =

Railway preservation company in Lancashire, England

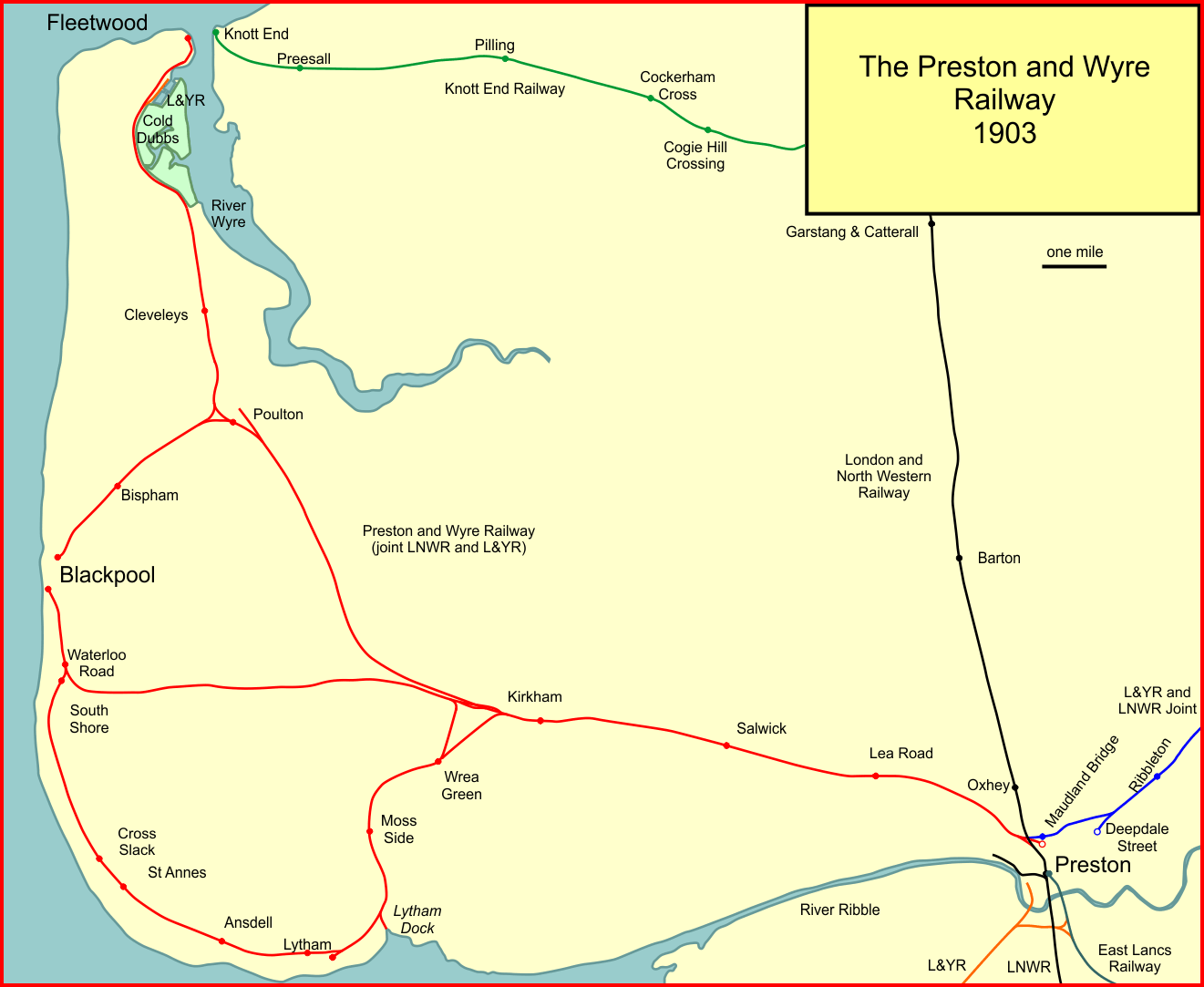
- The Preston and Wyre Railway (in red) in 1903. Poulton & Wyre Railway Society focuses on the section of line between Poulton and Fleetwood
- Formation: 2006 (20 years ago)
- Headquarters: The Print Room; Hillhouse Business Park; Thornton, Lancashire
- Chairman: David Evans
- Website: www.pwrs.org

Poulton & Wyre Railway Society (PWRS) is a railway preservation company based in Lancashire, England. Formed in 2006, its main focus has been working towards reinstating the railway line between Poulton-le-Fylde and Fleetwood (part of the Preston and Wyre Railway) for passenger use. The line was taken out of use in 1970 and removed in certain sections.

== History ==
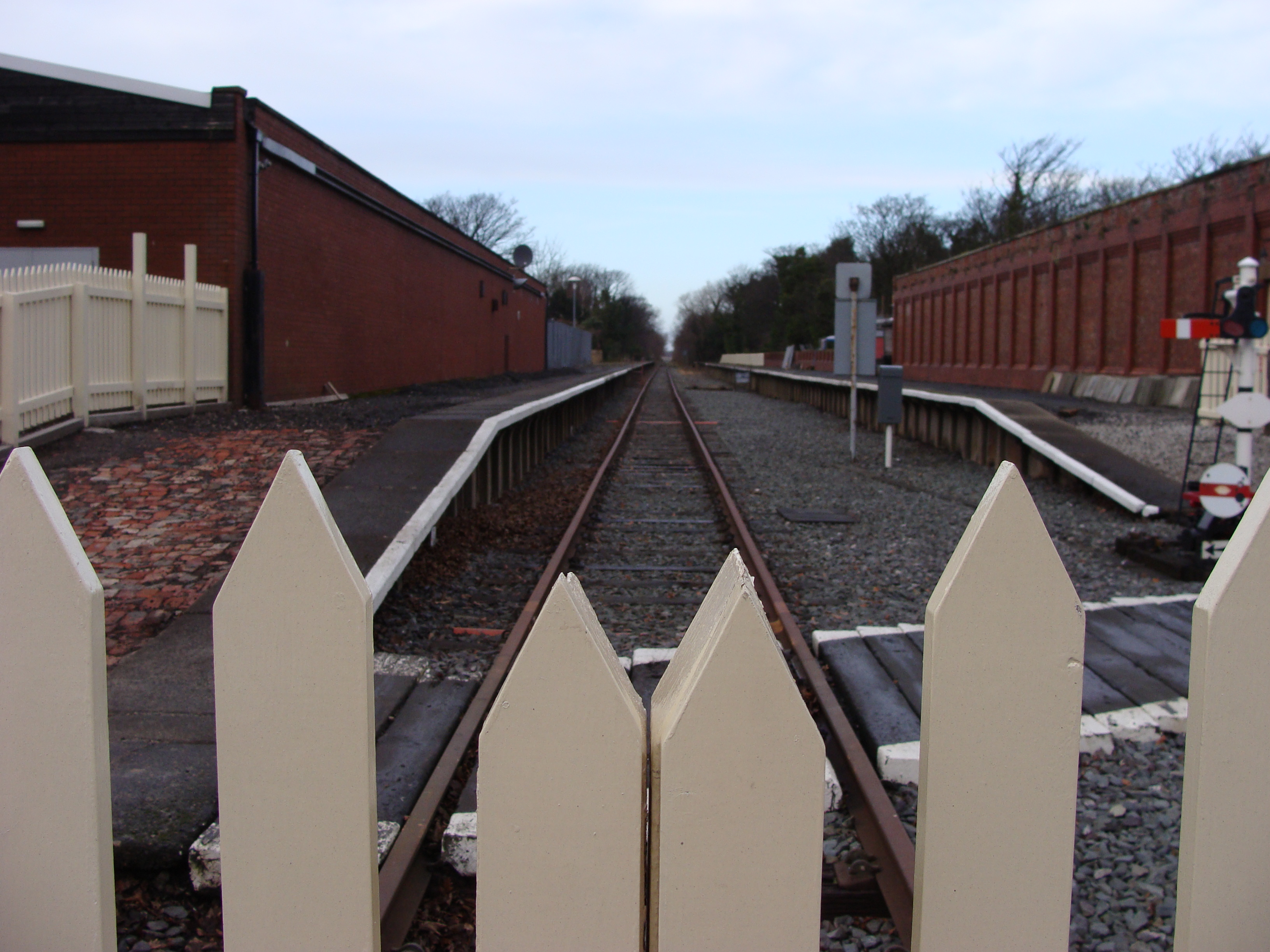
The former Thornton for Cleveleys station platforms post-renovation in 2014

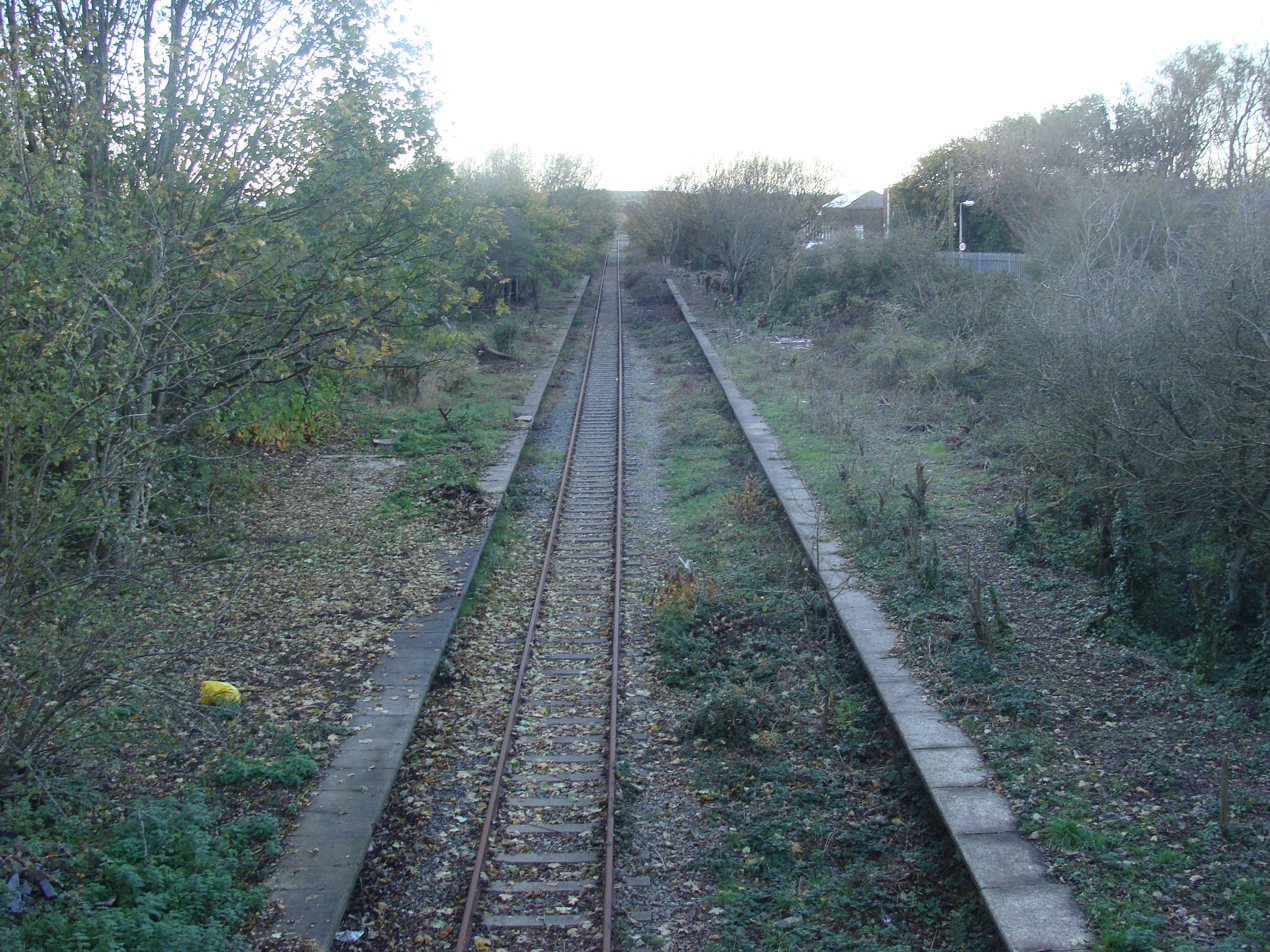
Early restoration work at Burn Naze Halt in 2013

Poulton & Wyre Railway Society was formed in 2006, after a merger between Wyre Rail Cycle Partnership and a heritage railway group.

In 2007, the society obtained a non-operational lease from Network Rail for a section of line between the former Thornton for Cleveleys station in Thornton Centre and Hillylaid Road, a short distance to the north. The main aim was to clear the station's extant platforms of vegetation. This was achieved.

Network Rail upgraded the lease to a clearance licence the following year, and extended its coverage to the entire line between Poulton-le-Fylde and Jameson Road in Fleetwood.

In 2010, PWRS were given a three-year lease for Thornton for Cleveleys station. Lancashire County Council (LCC) supported the scheme. A £30,000 feasibility study was undertaken to explore the re-instatement of the link and the addition of a third platform at Poulton-le-Fylde station.

Highway England granted a licence to the society in 2015 to allow access to the line between the Wyre Way footpath and the A585 Amounderness Way.

In 2019, a motion requesting a feasibility study into the restoration was rejected by Wyre Council. This followed LCC's denial of £50,000 in funding the previous week.

On 28 February 2020, British Prime Minister Boris Johnson made an unannounced visit to the Thornton station, three months before the 50th anniversary of the last passengers arriving there. He invited local councillor Brian Crawford onto the tracks for a private word. When Johnson asked what Crawford needed, he replied that £100,000 was necessary for an initial feasibility study. Johnson granted the request, and said he wanted the station to reopen before the next election, which was due in 2024. The line was one of several chosen as part of a policy to "Reverse Beeching" (see Beeching cuts).

The study, completed in 2021, found that the line could be reopened for heavy rail, to integrate with the national rail network. It confirmed it could also be used for 'light' rail, as an extension of the Blackpool Tramway route, or as a hybrid system, using vehicles which could operate on both heavy- and light-rail systems. The study also found that reopening the link would propose an 11-minute journey from Fleetwood to Poulton, and 28 minutes from Fleetwood to Preston. A journey which currently takes an hour by public transport.

In 2022, plans to reinstate the railway line between Poulton-le-Fylde and Fleetwood were approved by Parliament, with the Department for Transport agreeing to fund the project.

The society, having completed a full restoration of Thornton for Cleveleys station, has now begun work to clear vegetation and restore the disused platform at Burn Naze Halt, 2 miles (3.2 km) north of Thornton for Cleveleys, as part of their ambition to restore most of the line for heritage trains. The former Burn Naze station is located within the Hillhouse Enterprise Zone (part of the former ICI Hillhouse site, which was in operation between 1941 and 1992). It is possible that the station could be relocated to nearby Butts Close in Burn Naze, where there is space for a potential car park. PWRS moved its headquarters to the Hillhouse Enterprise Zone, having been given a plot of land by NPL Group.

In 2023, an 1890 Lancashire and Yorkshire Victorian railway carriage body was acquired by the society from Raikes Farmhouse in Thornton.

Plans for a Heritage Railway Centre, with a museum, offices, workshop and a test track, are underway.

== Locomotives ==
The society has purchased and restored a John Fowler shunter from Leyland Motors, as well as two Class 108 diesel multiple units (DMU), which are also being restored. One is a trailer car, the other is power car.

== Personnel ==
As of 2024, the society's chairman is David Evans. The Labour Party's Cat Smith is a PWRS member.
