= Burn Naze railway station =

Former station in Thornton-Cleveleys, UK

Burn Naze
- The station viewed around 1950, looking north

General information
- Location: Burn Naze, Wyre; England
- Coordinates: 53.8867°N 3.0040°W
- Grid reference: SD341438
- Platforms: 2

Other information
- Status: Disused

History
- Original company: Preston and Wyre Joint Railway
- Pre-grouping: Preston and Wyre Joint Railway
- Post-grouping: London, Midland and Scottish Railway

Key dates
- 1 February 1909: Station opened
- 1 June 1970: Station closed
Location
- Location within the Borough of Wyre Location within Lancashire

Burn Naze railway station served Burn Naze in Thornton-Cleveleys, Lancashire, England, between 1909 and 1970. The platforms of the halt were heavily overgrown with vegetation until 2014, when the Poulton & Wyre Railway Society began restoration work.

The line used to be double track, but has been reduced to single track since passenger services ceased in 1970.

It was a popular alighting station for workers of ICI Hillhouse and its predecessor, United Alkali Company.

== Preservation ==
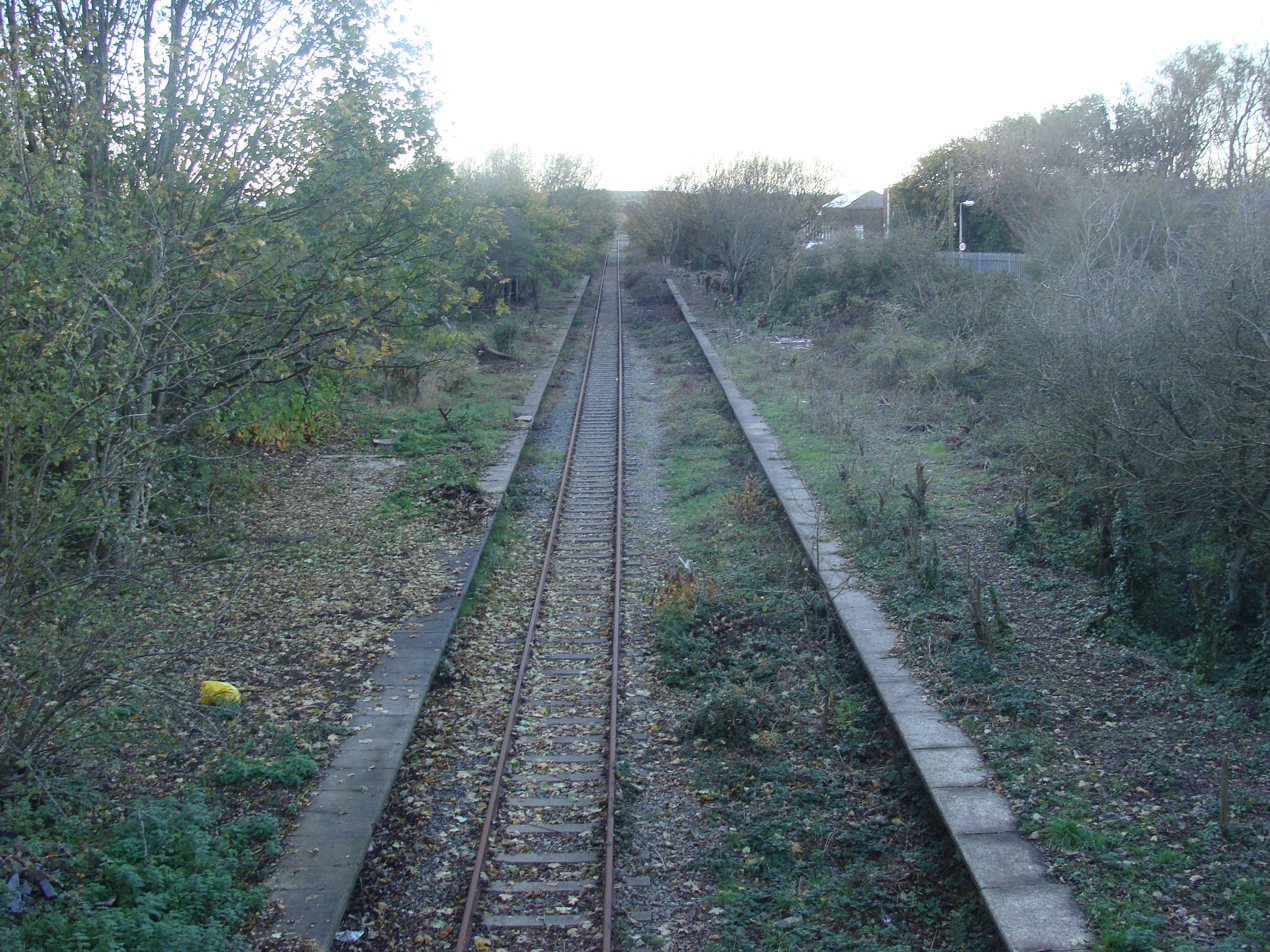
Burn Naze Station in autumn 2013, just over six months after the Poulton & Wyre Railway Society took over restoration of the station

In spring 2013, the Poulton & Wyre Railway Society were granted an extension to their licence from Network Rail to work on the trackbed, covering the whole branch from Poulton. They then began work on clearing the platforms at Burn Naze Station. As of January 2024, the station has been cleared extensively and the society are continuing their clearance work ready for the line to reopen.

| Preceding station | Disused railways | Following station |
|---|---|---|
| Wyre Dock | Preston and Wyre; Joint Railway; Fleetwood Branch Line | Thornton for Cleveleys |
