= Poulton-le-Fylde railway station =

Railway station in Lancashire, England

Poulton-le-Fylde
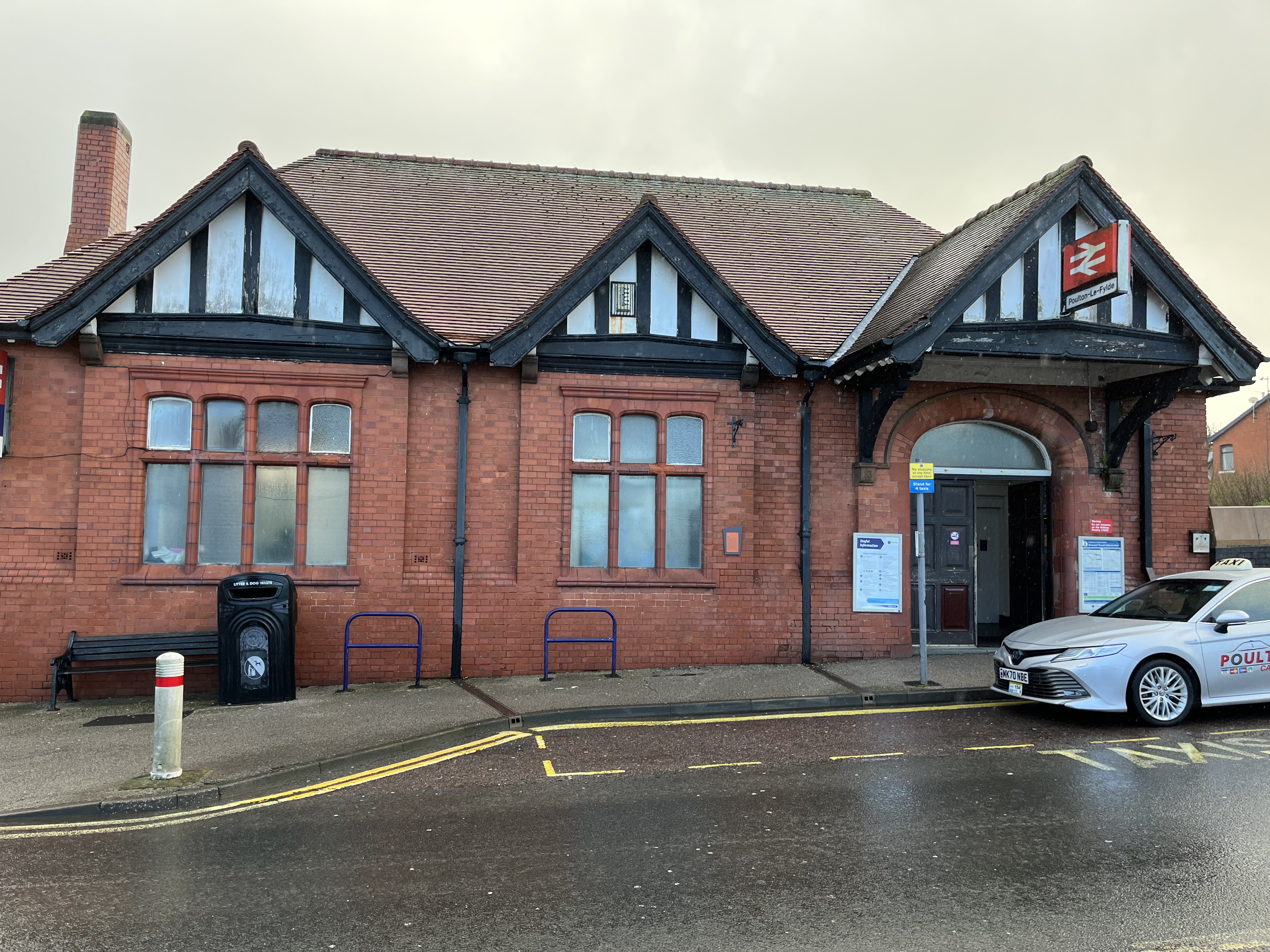
- The station building in 2023

General information
- Location: Poulton-le-Fylde, Wyre, England
- Coordinates: 53.8484°N 2.9906°W
- Grid reference: SD349395
- Manager: Northern Trains
- Platforms: 2

Other information
- Station code: PFY
- Classification: DfT category E

Key dates
- 15 July 1840: Original station opened
- 1896: New station on realigned route

Passengers
- 2020/21: ▼0.106 million
- 2021/22: ▲0.425 million
- 2022/23: ▲0.510 million
- 2023/24: ▲0.583 million
- 2024/25: ▲0.630 million
Location
Notes
- Passenger statistics from the Office of Rail and Road

Poulton-le-Fylde railway station serves the town of Poulton-le-Fylde, Lancashire, England. It is managed by Northern Trains, which provides services along with Avanti West Coast. It is on the Blackpool North line, between Layton and Kirkham & Wesham, 14 miles 31 chains (23.2 km) from Preston.

== History ==
Railways in Poulton-le-Fylde; the dates refer to passenger services

The original station was sited about 400 yards (400 m) north-east of the current location, at "The Breck". The railway to the fishing town of Fleetwood, via Burn Naze, passed along a straight line east of the town. From 1846, there was a junction to Blackpool just north of the station, with tight connecting curves facing either way. In 1893 a fatal accident occurred when a train took the curve too fast. In 1896, the tracks were realigned to follow a much gentler westward curve to Blackpool, with the new station halfway along the curve. The Fleetwood branch then curved to the east to rejoin the original alignment. The old station continued to be used as a goods station until 1968.

Passenger services to Fleetwood were withdrawn by British Rail in 1966, and thence services to Wyre Dock on 1 June 1970 during railway restructuring. The line is still extant, albeit overgrown and disused, but the junction with the Blackpool line west of the station was removed in April 2017 in preparation for electrification of the route. Since June 2006, there have been plans by Poulton & Wyre Railway Society to restore and preserve the passenger rail link towards Fleetwood, via Thornton & Cleveleys, as a heritage railway.

=== Modernisation ===
The modernisation and electrification of the Preston to Blackpool North line, and hence Poulton-le-Fylde station, was announced in December 2009. The modernisation included completely new signalling of the entire line along with rationalisation of the lines and removal of the connection into the Fleetwood branch. The removal of the signal box along with four others along the line was included as part of the works. This resulted in a total blockade of the line from 11 November 2017 until 25 March 2018, but was extended subsequently to 16 April 2018 due to bad weather.

== Facilities ==
The station has a ticket office at street level, which is staffed throughout the week. There is also a self-service ticket machine provided for use outside these times and for collecting pre-paid tickets. There is a waiting room at platform level, along with toilets, bench seating and timetable posters. Train running information is offered via automated announcements and digital display screens. Step-free access is available via lifts from the entrance to the platform when the ticket office is staffed.

== Passenger volume ==
Passenger Volume at Poulton-le-Fylde
	2002–03	2004–05	2005–06	2006–07	2007–08	2008–09	2009–10	2010–11	2011–12	2012–13	2013–14	2014–15	2015–16	2016–17	2017–18	2018–19	2019–20	2020–21	2021–22	2022–23
Entries and exits	245,880	300,947	321,082	339,292	365,130	383,850	391,840	417,558	449,680	458,918	481,862	509,612	526,174	550,292	423,220	433,190	547,252	105,762	425,336	509,880

The statistics cover twelve month periods that start in April.

== Services ==
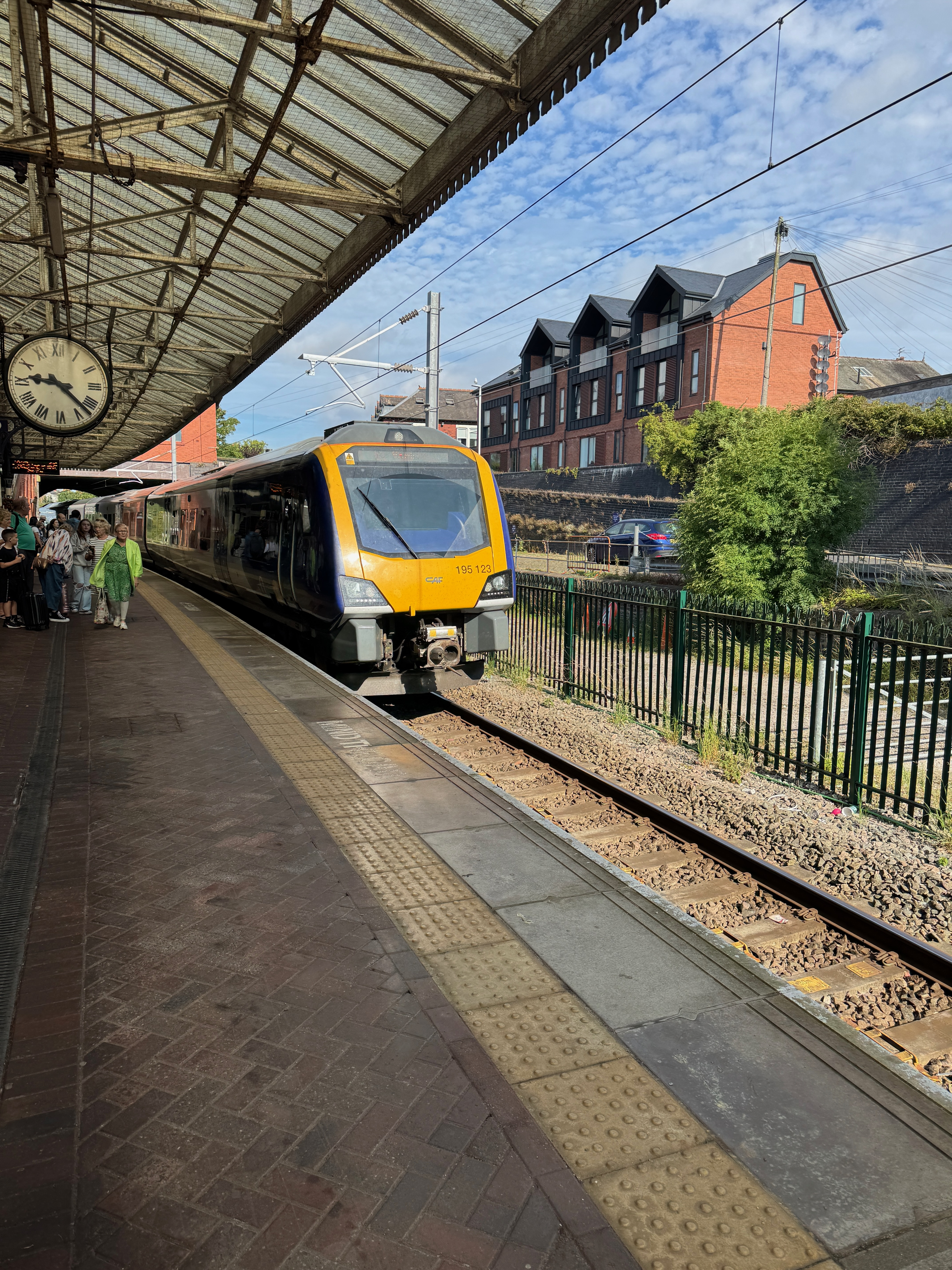
A Northern Trains Class 195 approaching platform 2 in 2024

The station is served by Northern Trains and Avanti West Coast. As of May 2025, the following general service pattern is provided in trains per hour/week:

=== Northern Trains ===
- 4 tph to Blackpool North, of which 1 tph calls at Layton
- 2 tph to Manchester Airport, via Preston, Bolton and Manchester Piccadilly (1tph on Sundays)
- 1 tph to Liverpool Lime Street, via Preston, Wigan North Western and St Helens Central
- 1 tph to York, via Preston, Bradford Interchange and Leeds.

=== Avanti West Coast ===
- 1tpw (Sundays) to Preston.

The station was also served by a single DalesRail service to Carlisle via Settle during the summer months, and to Hellifield (for onward travel to Settle and Carlisle) for the remainder of the year. Since December 2022, though, this service has been withdrawn. In 2024, it was announced that the route was set to return.

Preceding station	National Rail	Following station
Blackpool North	Avanti West Coast Blackpool North branch line Limited service	Kirkham & Wesham
Layton	Northern Trains Blackpool North to Manchester Airport	Kirkham & Wesham
Blackpool North	Northern Trains Blackpool North to Manchester Airport	Kirkham & Wesham
Blackpool North	Northern Trains Blackpool North to Liverpool Lime Street	Preston
Blackpool North	Northern Trains Blackpool North to Liverpool Lime Street	Kirkham & Wesham Sunday only
Blackpool North	Northern Trains Blackpool North to York	Kirkham & Wesham Monday to Saturday
Blackpool North	Northern Trains Blackpool North to York	Preston
	Historical railways	
Bispham	Preston and Wyre Joint Railway; Blackpool Branch Line	Singleton
	Disused railways	
Thornton for Cleveleys	Preston and Wyre Joint Railway; Fleetwood Branch Line	Singleton

== See also ==
- Public transport in the Fylde

== Bibliography ==
- Mitchell, L. & Hartley, S. (2005) "Lancashire Historic Town Survey—Poulton-le-Fylde" (PDF). Archived from the original (PDF) on 15 May 2011. (19.1 MiB), Lancashire County Council Environment Directorate, accessed 30 October 2007
- Suggitt, G. (2003, revised 2004) Lost Railways of Lancashire, Countryside Books, Newbury, ISBN 1-85306-801-2
- Quick, Michael (2023). Railway Passenger Stations in Great Britain: A Chronology (PDF) (5th ed.). London: Railway and Canal Historical Society.
- Welch, M.S. (2004) Lancashire Steam Finale, Runpast Publishing, Cheltenham, ISBN 1-870754-61-1
