= Fleetwood branch line =

Closed railway line in the UK

The Fleetwood branch line is a railway line that ran from Preston to Fleetwood. It passed through many smaller stations along the way, most of which are now closed. When work at Fleetwood docks was under threat in the mid-1960s, the main Fleetwood station was closed, and the remainder of the branch south to Poulton followed in 1970. There are active proposals to re-open the branch to passenger services.

== History ==
The line was first opened in 1840. In 1966, Fleetwood station was closed, and Wyre Dock station became the terminus. However, four years later, in 1970, passenger services were curtailed as far as Poulton-le-Fylde. The line continued as a freight route to access the ICI plant at Burn Naze Halt until 1999, when all traffic on the line ceased.

== Current situation ==
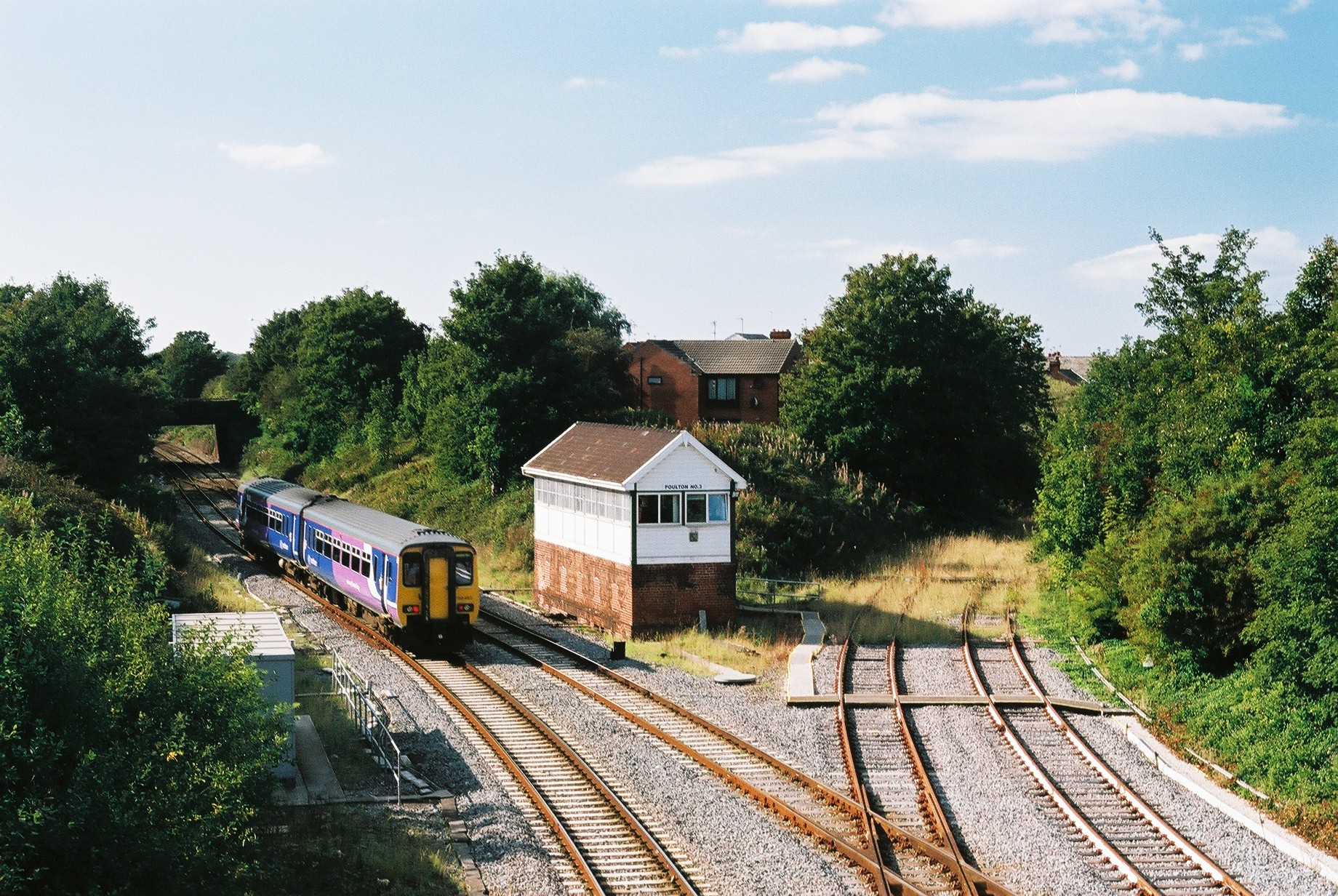
Poulton-le-Fylde Junction, where the disused line joined the main line to Blackpool (2008)

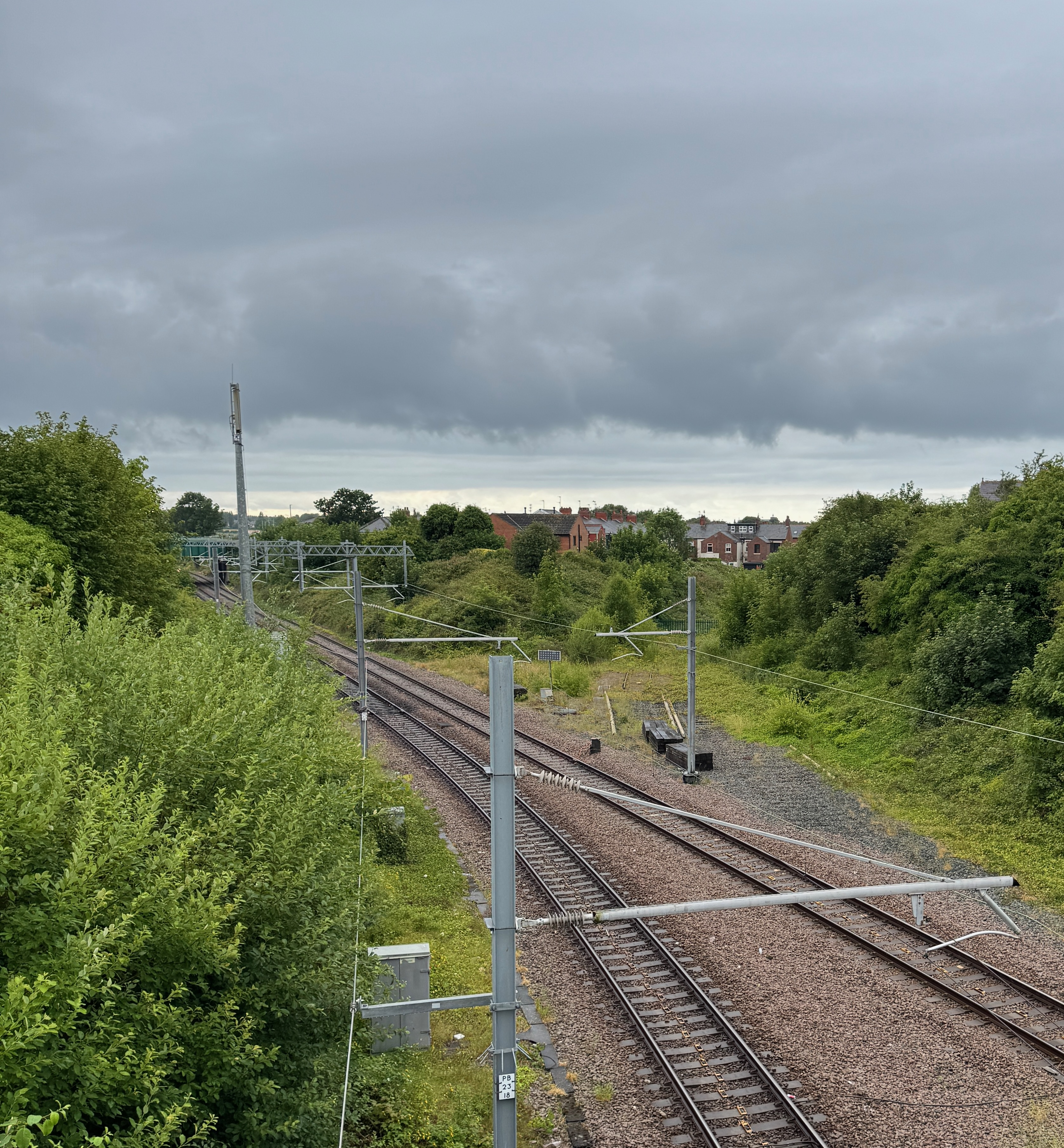
The same view in 2024

Some of the line is now cleared of overgrowth because the northern track was not lifted from past Burn Naze Halt to just beyond Jameson Road in Fleetwood. However, the road bridge was filled in below it. The junction, last used when goods trains took coal to Fleetwood Power Station, still exists. Looking over the road bridge on Jameson Road, the track to both north and south can still be seen through the undergrowth. In the 1990s, the new A585 Amounderness Way bypass was built on the former trackbed, although sufficient space still exists for a reinstated railway should it be required.

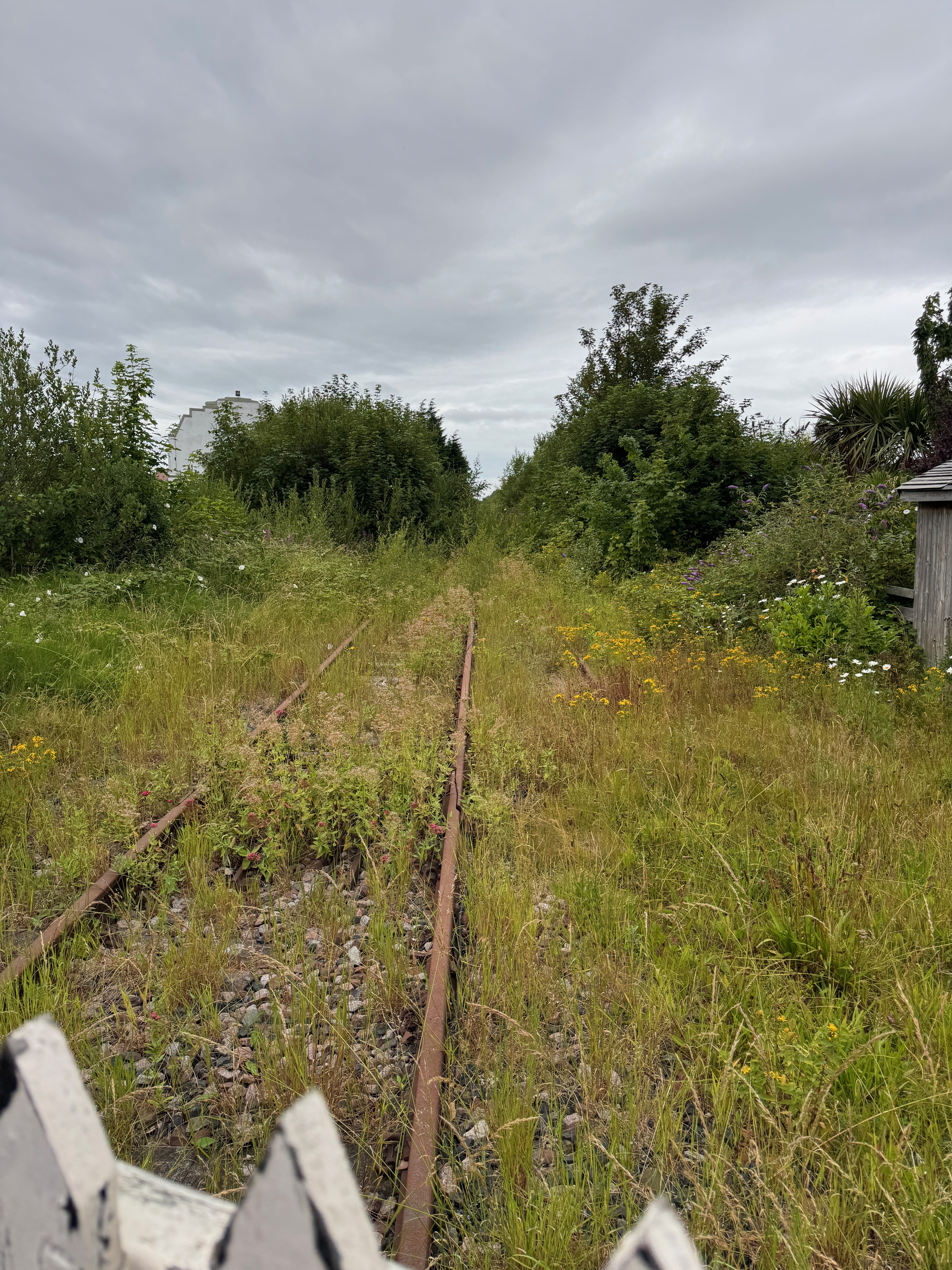
The overgrown track in 2024, looking northbound from Hillylaid crossing in Thornton

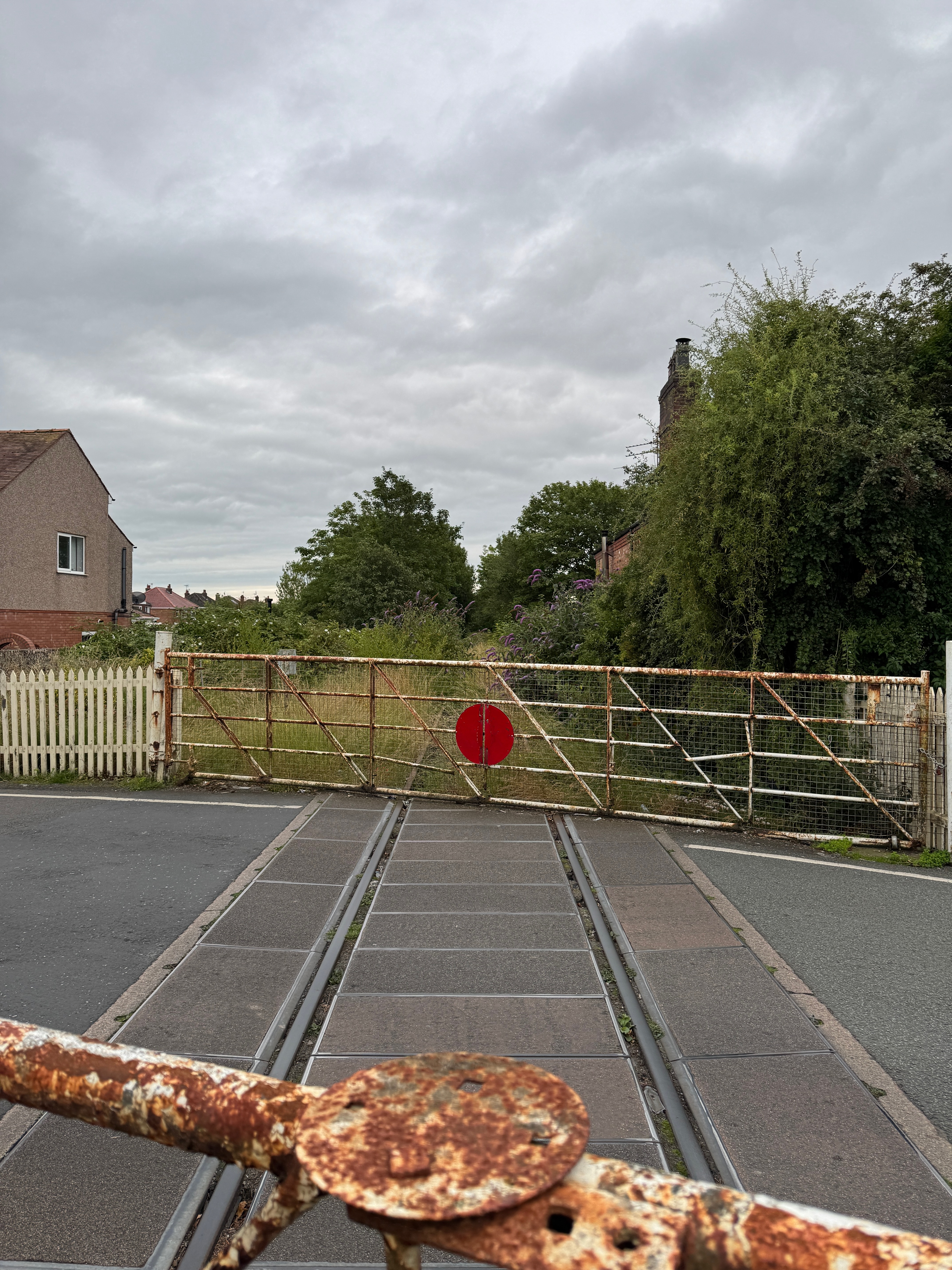
And southbound

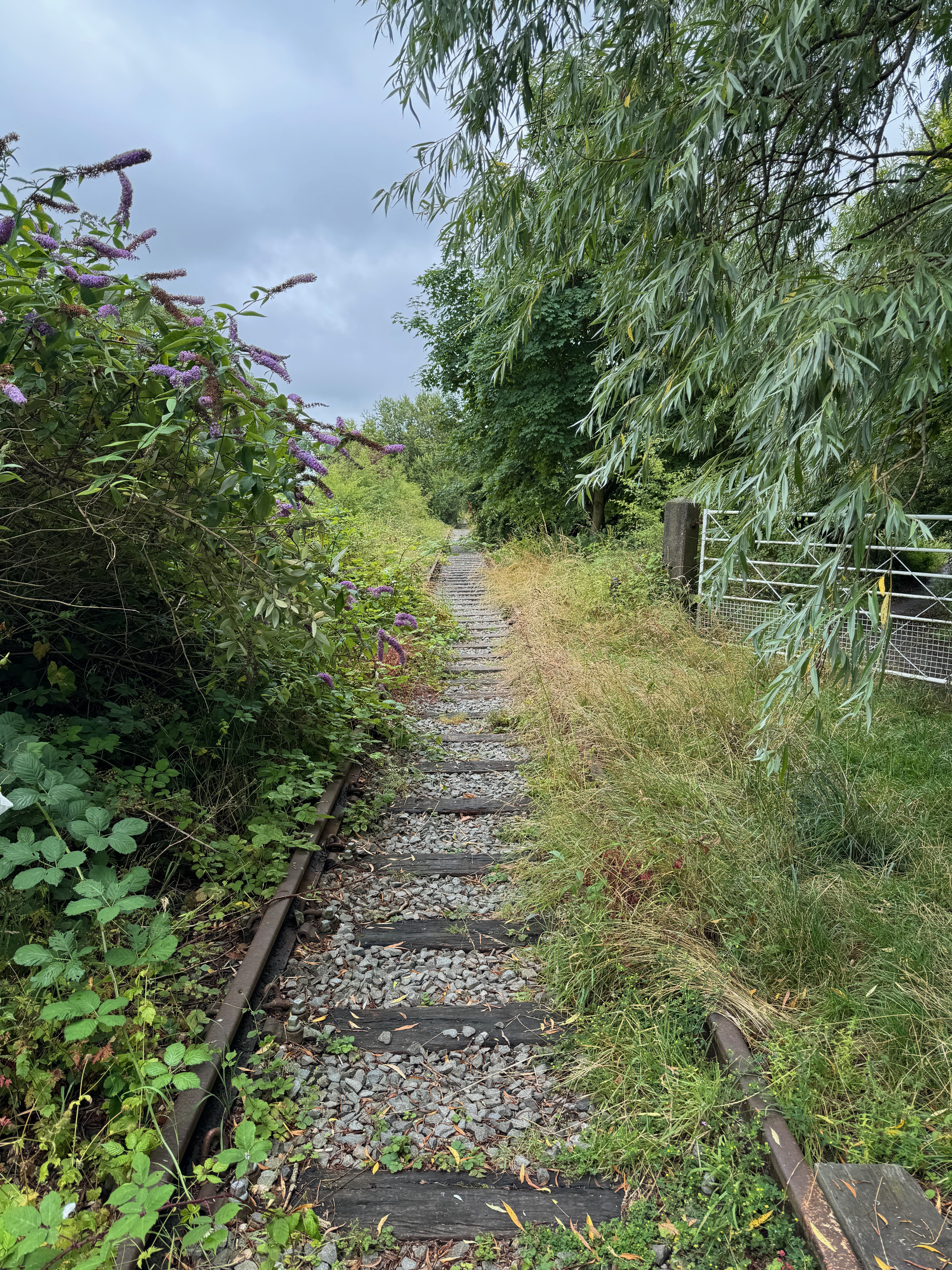
The crossing at New Lane, Thornton

== Future of the branch ==
In its 2009 Connecting Communities report, the Association of Train Operating Companies supported the re-opening of the branch line to Fleetwood, and Lancashire County Council's (LCC) Rail Improvement Schemes draft report in March 2010 stated that the case for re-opening was "compelling". Network Rail stated that a feasibility study had to take place first, which would cost around £30,000. As well as re-opening the branch, it is likely that a third platform would also be constructed at Poulton-le-Fylde.

During the 2019 general election campaign, Prime Minister Boris Johnson pledged to reopen the line.

As part of the Preston to Blackpool Electrification there is passive provision for reinstatement of the line to Burn Naze and Fleetwood.

In January 2019, the line was identified by Campaign for Better Transport as a priority 1 candidate for reopening.

In January 2020, the government announced funding of £100,000 for a feasibility study of the route.

The reinstatement of the Fleetwood Railway Line was allocated government funding in 2022 under the Restoring Your Railway Fund. and it is estimated that the cost of re-opening the branch is £5.5 million.

=== Preservation ===
The Poulton & Wyre Railway Society is a local organisation campaigning for the line to be re-instated and have taken a three-year lease on Thornton for Cleveleys station. LCC seeks to support the society to help to deliver the scheme.

The Society, having completed full restoration of Thornton-and-Cleveleys station as their headquarters, has now begun work to clear vegetation and restore the disused platform at Burn Naze halt, 2 miles (3.2 km) north of Thornton-and-Cleveleys, as part of their ambition to restore most of the line for heritage trains.

== See also ==
- Blackpool branch lines
- Preston and Wyre Joint Railway
