= Fleetwood railway station =

Station in Lancashire, UK (1840–1966)

Fleetwood
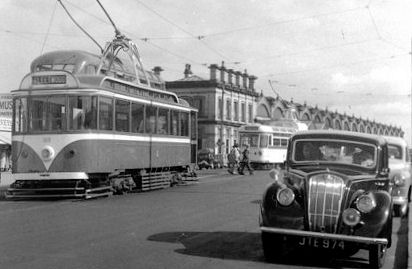
- Trams in front of the second Fleetwood station on Queen's Terrace in 1959

General information
- Location: Fleetwood, Wyre; England
- Coordinates: 53.9256°N 3.0055°W
- Grid reference: SD 3407 4819
- Platforms: 5

Other information
- Status: Disused

History
- Original company: Preston and Wyre Joint Railway
- Pre-grouping: Preston and Wyre Joint Railway
- Post-grouping: London, Midland and Scottish Railway

Key dates
- 16 July 1840: First station opened
- 15 July 1883: First station closed; second station opened
- 18 April 1966: Second station closed
- Locations in Fleetwood
Location

There have been three locations for Fleetwood railway station in Fleetwood, Lancashire, England. The first, from 1840 to 1883, was in Dock Street, opposite Church Street. The second, from 1883 to 1966, was in Queen's Terrace. From 1966 to 1970, the station previously known as Wyre Dock railway station was renamed "Fleetwood".

In 2009, the Association of Train Operating Companies proposed a new station at Fleetwood as part of a plan to expand the national rail network.

== Dock Street ==
The Preston and Wyre Joint Railway from Preston to Fleetwood was originally opened on 15 July 1840, with a terminus in Dock Street, opposite Church Street. In the original plans for the new town, the station was to be at the end of London Street, directly from the Mount, but this plan was not followed. The single-track line ran over an embankment and a timber trestle bridge in straight line northwards across the marshy Wyre estuary, with the station at the far end of the bridge. Within six years the trestle became unsafe and the railway was re-routed slightly inland, and the track doubled. Beyond the passenger station was a goods station at the south end of Queen's Terrace.

Between 1841 and 1848, Fleetwood was a part of the "West Coast Main Line" equivalent of its time. The fastest route from London to Glasgow was by train to Fleetwood, and thence by packet boat to Ardrossan. After 1848, the entire journey could be made by rail.

== Queen’s Terrace ==
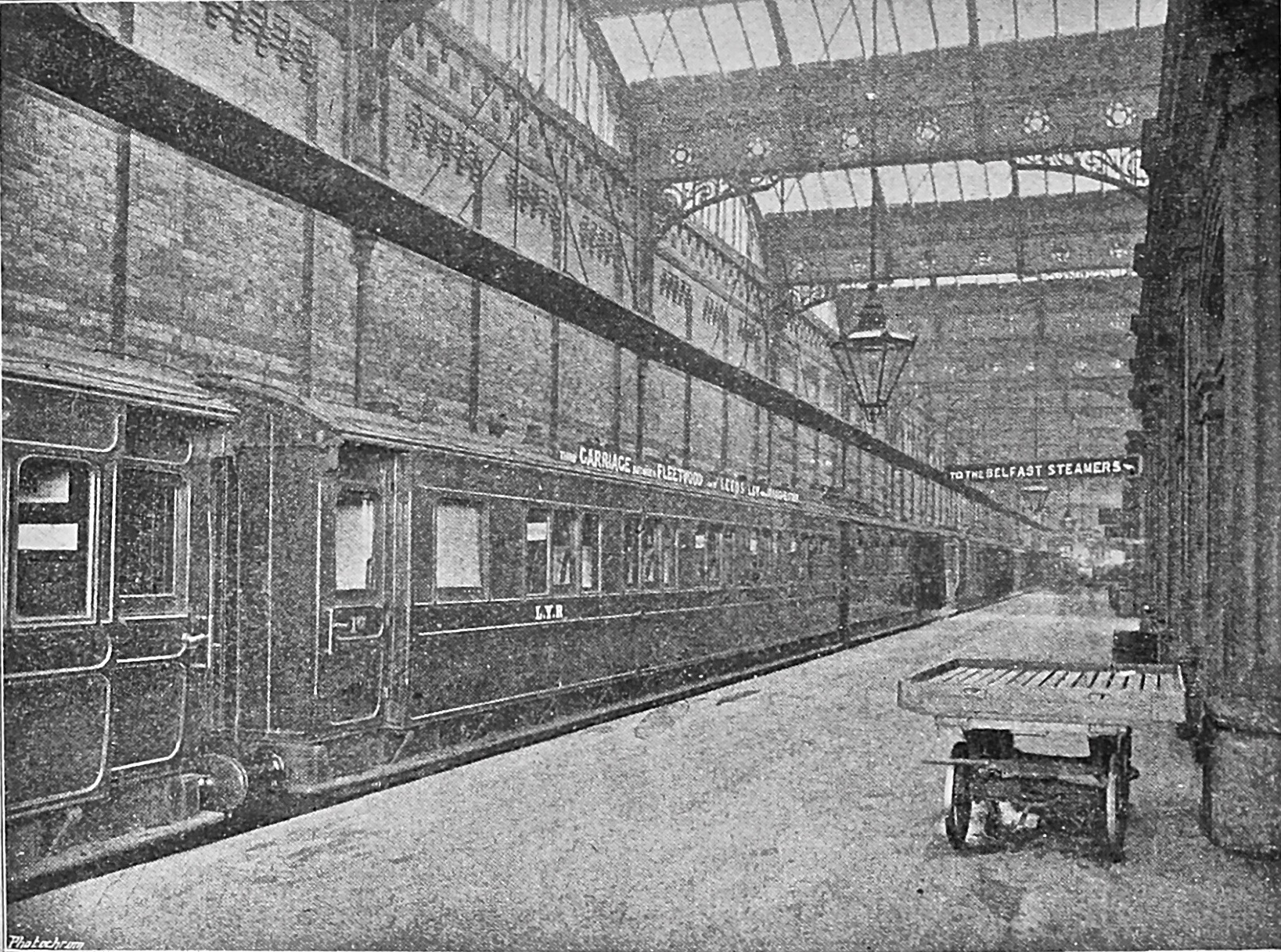
1901 new 8-coach Fleetwood-Manchester boat train

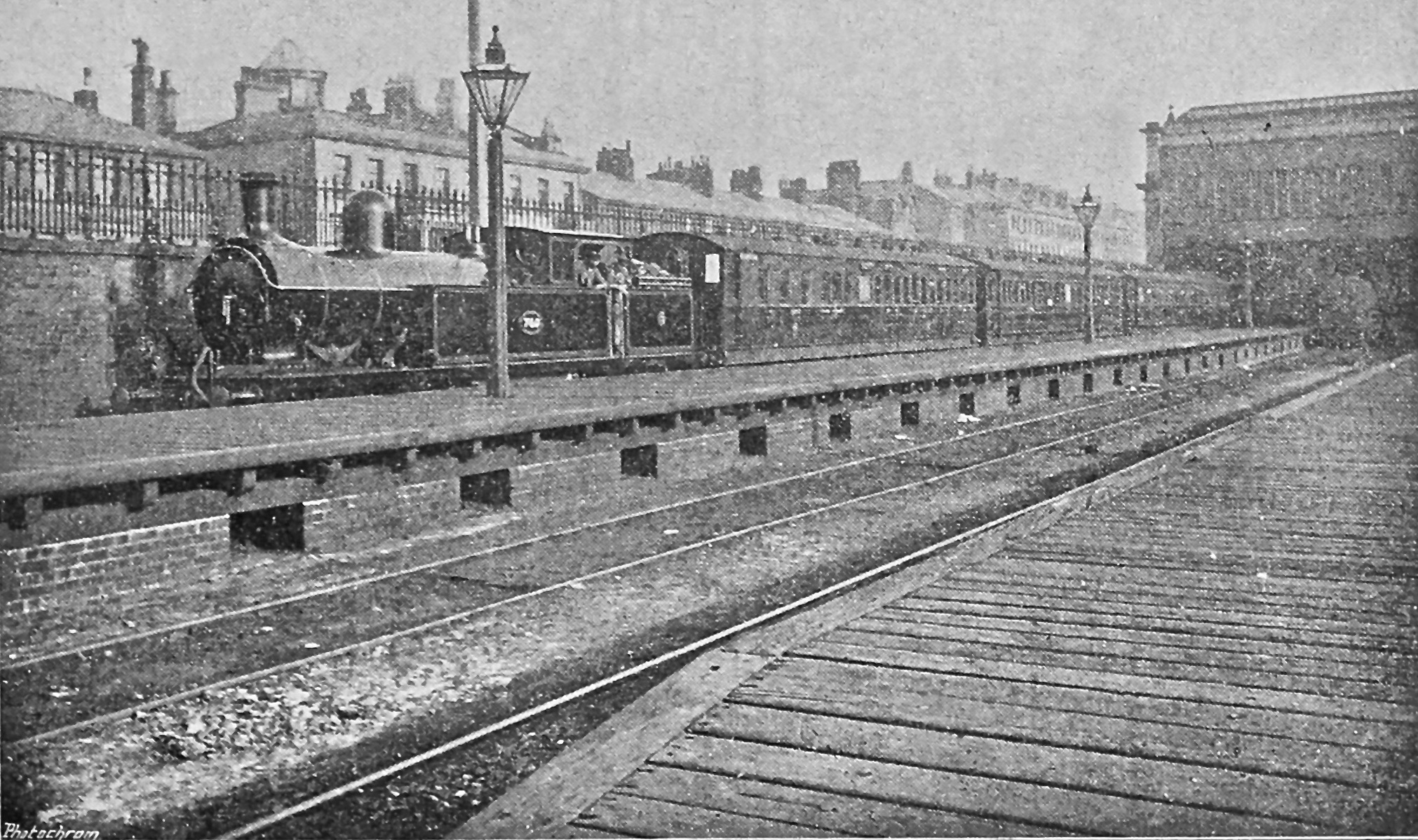
L&YR Class 5 at head of 1901 boat train

In July 1883, a replacement station was built opposite the north end of Queen's Terrace, which served as Fleetwood's main railway terminus from then until 18 April 1966, when it was closed due to the Beeching Cuts.

The railway approached the station from the south. Platforms 1 and 4 ran the full length of the station, the northern half of each platform being under a glass-roofed train shed. Between the platforms were the booking office, waiting rooms, left luggage office and so on. Platforms 2 and 3 were shorter bay platforms which did not enter the train shed. Platform 5 was the boat train platform, the longest of all, which ran outside the train shed along its eastern side. At the north end was a glass-roofed concourse, running from the Queen's Terrace entrance to the jetty for steamers on the side of the Wyre. On the north side of the concourse were refreshment rooms, separately for first- and second-class passengers. There were further goods sheds and sidings to east of the station.

The station was demolished after closure and a restaurant built on part of the site. In 1973, the remainder was developed into a container port facility, operating ro-ro service to Northern Ireland, which continued until January 2011, when Stena Line removed the Fleetwood to Larne route.

== Wyre Dock ==
When the Queen's Terrace station closed, the passenger service was relocated to the existing Wyre Dock railway station, which was situated at the southern end of Dock Street, about one-half mile (800 m) away, and was renamed "Fleetwood" station.

== Notes ==
Preceding station	Disused railways	Following station
Terminus	Preston and Wyre Joint Railway; Fleetwood Branch Line	Wyre Dock
