= Four Lane Ends, Thornton-Cleveleys =

Junction in Thornton-Cleveleys, England

Four Lane Ends
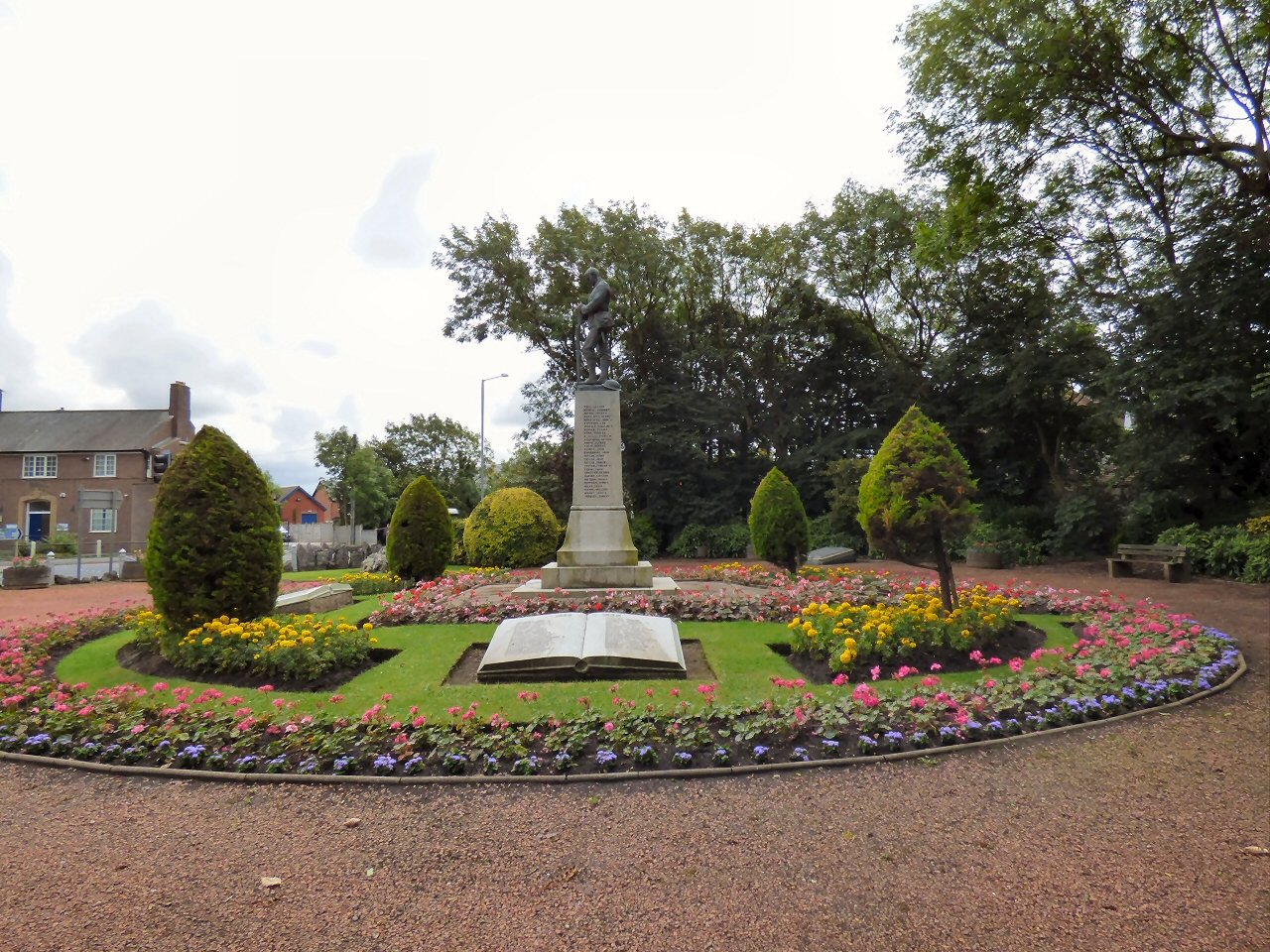
- Thornton-Cleveleys War Memorial at Four Lane Ends, looking southeast
- Interactive map of Four Lane Ends

Location
- Thornton-Cleveleys, Lancashire, England
- Coordinates: 53°52′19″N 3°00′38″W
- Roads at junction: B5412

Construction
- Type: Road junction
- Maintained by: Wyre Borough Council

Location in Lancashire
Four Lane Ends (Lancashire)

Four Lane Ends is a road junction in Thornton-Cleveleys, Lancashire, England. It is formed by the meeting of the north–south-running Fleetwood Road and the east–west-bound Victoria Road, the B5412. The names of both roads change in line with their directions at the junction, with Fleetwood Road North (leading to and from Fleetwood) becoming Fleetwood Road South (leading to and from the Norcross Roundabout primarily) and Victoria Road East (leading to and from Thornton Centre) becomes Victoria Road West (leading to and from Cleveleys).

At the northeastern corner, and accessed from Fleetwood Road North, stands the Rushlands, a former doctor's home and retirement home, built around 1928. It is now a hotel.

A former NatWest Bank building stands in the southeastern corner. It replaced Swarbricks Farm.

The Grade II listed Thornton-Cleveleys War Memorial, erected in 1923, stands at the southwestern corner of the junction.

Thornton's public library (opened in 1938) and Thornton Little Theatre (formerly Thornton Lecture Hall) occupy the northwestern corner.
