= Marsh Farmhouse =

- Marsh Farm; Marsh House Farm
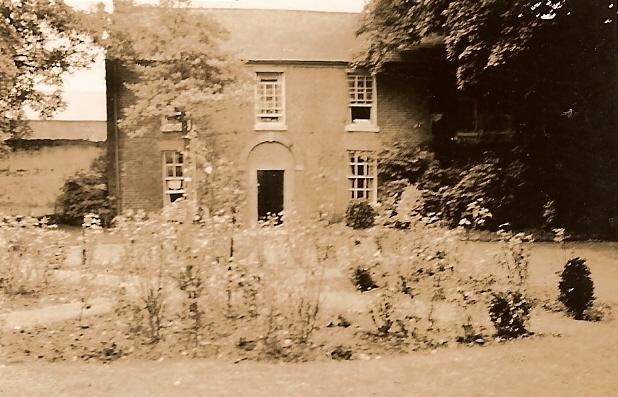
- The farmhouse in 1925

- Location within the Borough of Wyre Location within Lancashire
- 53.87162°N 3.01928°W
- Location: Thornton-Cleveleys, Lancashire, England

History
- Built: 1803 (223 years ago)

Site notes
- Area: Borough of Wyre

Listed Building – Grade II
- Designated: 16 August 1983
- Reference no.: 1073153

Marsh Farmhouse is a historic building in Thornton-Cleveleys, Lancashire, England. Built in 1803, it is a Grade II listed building. It is located to the southeast of today's Amounderness Way roundabout at Victoria Road East (known as Ramper Road at the time).

The farmhouse is in brick with stone dressings, partly rendered, with a concrete tiled roof. It has two storeys and a symmetrical two-bay front. The central doorway has a semicircular relieving brick arch with stone imposts and a keystone inscribed with the name "B. F. Hesketh Esq 1803", referring to Bold Fleetwood Hesketh, son of Fleetwood Hesketh and Frances Bold. The windows are sashes.

Hesketh died in 1819, aged 57, and was buried in the churchyard of St Chad's Church, Poulton-le-Fylde, alongside his parents.

== See also ==
- Listed buildings in Thornton-Cleveleys
