= Four Lane Ends =

Four Lane Ends is the name of several locations in England:

- Four Lane Ends Interchange, a metro station in East Newcastle upon Tyne
- Four Lane Ends, Thornton-Cleveleys, a road junction in Thornton-Cleveleys, Lancashire
- Four Lane Ends, a district within the ward of Richmond, South Yorkshire
- Four Lane Ends, a hamlet near Tiverton, Cheshire
