= Listed buildings in Thornton-Cleveleys =

Thornton-Cleveleys is an unparished area in the Wyre district of Lancashire, England. It contains eleven buildings that are recorded in the National Heritage List for England as designated listed buildings. Of these, one is at Grade II*, the middle grade, and the others are at Grade II, the lowest grade. The area has an agricultural background, and is now largely residential. The listed buildings consist of former farmhouses, other houses and cottages, a windmill, a war memorial, and two churches.

== Key ==
Grade	Criteria
II*	Particularly important buildings of more than special interest
II	Buildings of national importance and special interest

== Buildings ==
Name and location	Photograph	Date	Notes	Grade
Raikes Farmhouse; 53.87362°N 2.98924°W		1692	A rear extension was added to the farmhouse in the 19th century. The house is pebbledashed with a slate roof, and has two storeys and three bays. The doorway has a plain surround, and the windows on the front are casements. The gable walls contain small sash windows, and in the right gable wall is an inscribed sandstone tablet.	II
Poolfoot Cottage; 53.88224°N 3.00781°W		1694	Originally a pair of cottages. later converted into a single dwelling, it has cobble walls, now rendered and whitewashed, with a slate roof. It is in a single storey with five bays. The windows vary and include French windows, a sliding sash window, and a bay window. On the front is a modern porch.	II
Calf Heys; 53.87725°N 3.02316°W	—	18th century	A house, later extended and used as a vicarage, and later a private house. It is in rendered brick with a slate roof, it has an L-shaped plan, and is in Regency style. There are two storeys and five unequal bays. There is a modern glazed porch, and the windows are sashes.	II
Trunnah Farmhouse; 53.87769°N 3.00614°W		1769	The former farmhouse with attached barn is in rendered brick with a slate roof. The house has two storeys and a symmetrical front of two bays that contain an oval datestone. Most of the windows are sashes, and there is also a French window. At the right end are stone quoins.	II
Marsh Mill; 53.87492°N 3.01199°W		1794	This is a tower windmill with an attached drying kiln house. The tower is rendered with a circular plan, it is tapered, and has five storeys. At the top is a rotating boat-shaped wooden cap with an eight-bladed fantail and four sails. Around the second floor is wooden staging with rails. There is a ground floor doorway, two doorways at the level of the staging, and most of the windows are square. The drying kiln is in two storeys with a ventilator on the ridge and a first floor taking-in door. Inside, the original machinery has been restored to working order.	II*
Marsh Farmhouse; 53.87162°N 3.01928°W		1803	The farmhouse is in brick with stone dressings, partly rendered, with a concrete tiled roof. It has two storeys and a symmetrical two-bay front. The central doorway has a semicircular relieving brick arch with stone imposts and an inscribed keystone. The windows are sashes.	II
Sacred Heart Church; 53.88148°N 3.00844°W		1899	A Roman Catholic church designed by Pugin & Pugin in Decorated style. It is in yellow sandstone with dressings in red sandstone, and has slate roofs. The church consists of a nave, a short chancel flanked by chapels, and a tower at the east end. The tower contains a statue of Christ in a niche, and has an embattled parapet. The west wall of the chancel contains a rose window, and there is a gallery at the east end.	II
Greenside, The Rest and Ivy Cottage; 53.88879°N 3.04084°W	—	1901	A group of four houses forming a quadrangle, by Edwin Lutyens in free Arts and Crafts style. They are in rendered and whitewashed brick, and have swept and hipped red tile roofs. The houses have two storeys, and contain casement windows, and the courtyard is approached through arches.	II
Delph Cottage, York Cottage, Red Cottage and Mitre Cottage; 53.88847°N 3.04085°W	—	1901	A group of four houses forming a quadrangle, by Edwin Lutyens in free Arts and Crafts style. They are in rendered and whitewashed brick, and have swept and hipped red tile roofs. The houses have two storeys, and contain casement windows, and the courtyard is approached through arches.	II
St Andrew's Church; 53.87869°N 3.04031°W		1909–10	The tower was added in 1939, followed by the west bays of the nave, the baptistry, and the west porch in the 1950s. The church is in Decorated style, and is built in yellow sandstone with dressings in red sandstone, and has roofs of Welsh slate with bands of green slate. It consists of a nave, a baptistry, west porches, aisles, transepts, a chancel, vestries, a southeast chapel, and a northeast tower. The tower has two stages, incorporating a vestry, and has angle buttresses, and a top stage with square corner projections.	II
War Memorial; 53.87173°N 3.01070°W		1923	The war memorial, designed by Albert Toft, stands in the centre of a garden at a crossroads known as Four Lane Ends. It consists of a bronze statue depicting a soldier standing with a rifle. The statue is on a square granite shaft, on a tapered plinth, on a base of two steps. On the shaft is an inscription and the names of those lost in the First World War. In front and at the sides of the memorial are three granite tablets in the form of open books with the names of those lost in the Second World War.	II
