= List of highways numbered 586 =

The following highways are numbered 586:

== United Kingdom ==
- A586 road

== United States ==
- SR 586
- LA 586
- MD 586
- PR-586
- FM 586

| Preceded by 585 | Lists of highways 586 | Succeeded by 587 |
