= Raikes Farmhouse =

Historic building in Lancashire, England

- Raikes Farm; The Raikes
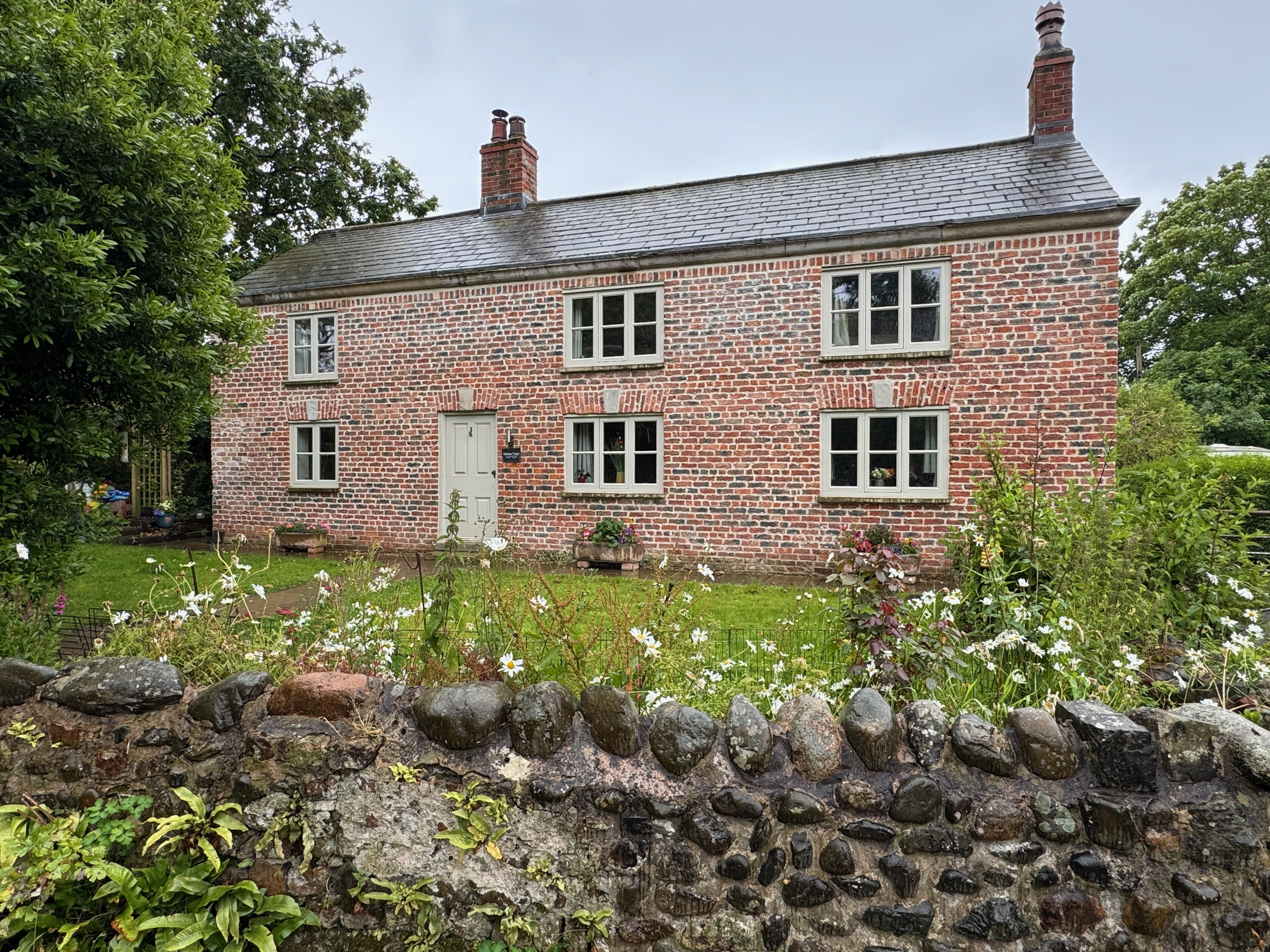
- The building in 2024

- Location within the Borough of Wyre Location within Lancashire Location within England
- 53.8736°N 2.9892°W
- Location: Thornton-Cleveleys, Lancashire, England

History
- Built: 1692 (334 years ago)

Site notes
- Area: Borough of Wyre

Listed Building – Grade II
- Designated: 16 August 1983
- Reference no.: 1073151

Raikes Farmhouse is a historic building in Thornton-Cleveleys, Lancashire, England. Replacing a building dating from at least 1595, the current structure was built in 1692, with a rear extension added in the 19th century. It has been designated a Grade II listed building by Historic England. The property is located on Raikes Road, just southeast of its junction with Stanah Road and Hillylaid Road.

The property was renovated sometime between 2011 and 2019, a process that removed its pebbledashing.

In 2014, a planning application was made to demolish three barns and erect six dwellings on the property, but the application was later withdrawn.

An 1890 Lancashire and Yorkshire Victorian railway carriage body was acquired from the farm by Poulton & Wyre Railway Society in 2023.

== History ==
For much of the 20th century and the early part of the 21st century, the property was owned by the Hodgkinson family. Thomas Hodgkinson died in 2008, aged 87; his wife, Eunice, died three years later. In 1905, Richard and Ann Wright were living there.

A tablet, made of sandstone, is visible on the building's right gable, with the initials "B. T. S." and the year "1692".

== Gallery ==
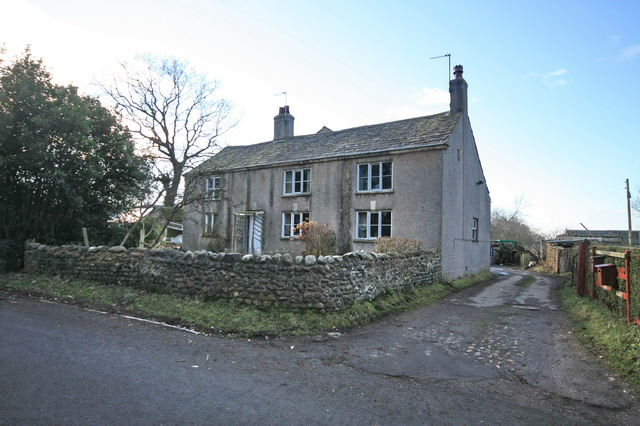
The farmhouse in 2009, prior to its renovation

== See also ==
- Listed buildings in Thornton-Cleveleys

== Sources ==
- Historic England, "Raikes Farmhouse, Thornton-Cleveleys (1073151)", National Heritage List for England
