= List of highways numbered 585 =

Route 585, or Highway 585, may refer to:

== Canada ==
- Alberta Highway 585
- New Brunswick Route 585
- Ontario Highway 585

== Ireland ==
- R585 regional road

== United Kingdom ==
- A585 road

== United States ==
- I-585
- SR 585
- KY 585
- LA 585
- MS 585
- CR 585
- NM 585
- SR 585
- FM 585
- WYO 585

Territories

- Puerto Rico Highway 585

Preceded by 584	Lists of highways 585	Succeeded by 586
