= Trunnah Farmhouse =

Historic building in Lancashire, England

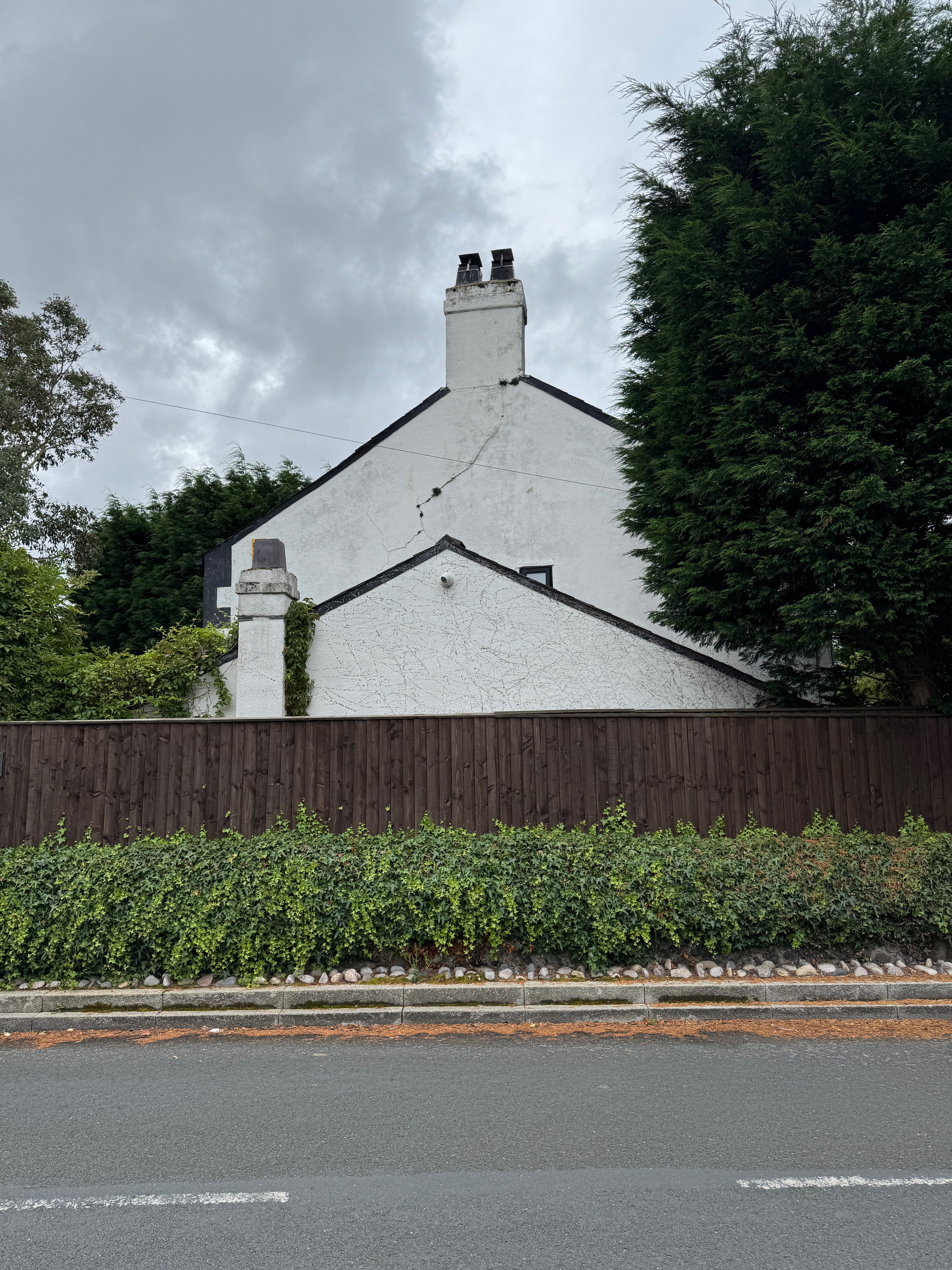
- Northern gable end, viewed from Woodland Avenue

- Location within the Borough of Wyre Location within Lancashire Location within England
- 53.877707°N 3.006174°W
- Location: Thornton-Cleveleys, Lancashire, England

History
- Built: 1769 (257 years ago)

Site notes
- Area: Borough of Wyre

Listed Building – Grade II
- Designated: 16 August 1983
- Reference no.: 1073151

Trunnah Farmhouse is a historic building on Woodland Avenue in Thornton-Cleveleys, Lancashire, England. A former farmhouse with attached barn, dating to 1769, it is in rendered brick with a slate roof. The house has two storeys and a symmetrical front of two bays that contain an oval datestone. Most of the windows are sashes, and there is also a French window. At the right end are stone quoins.

An oval datestone on the building states "R M J S 1769".

== Gallery ==
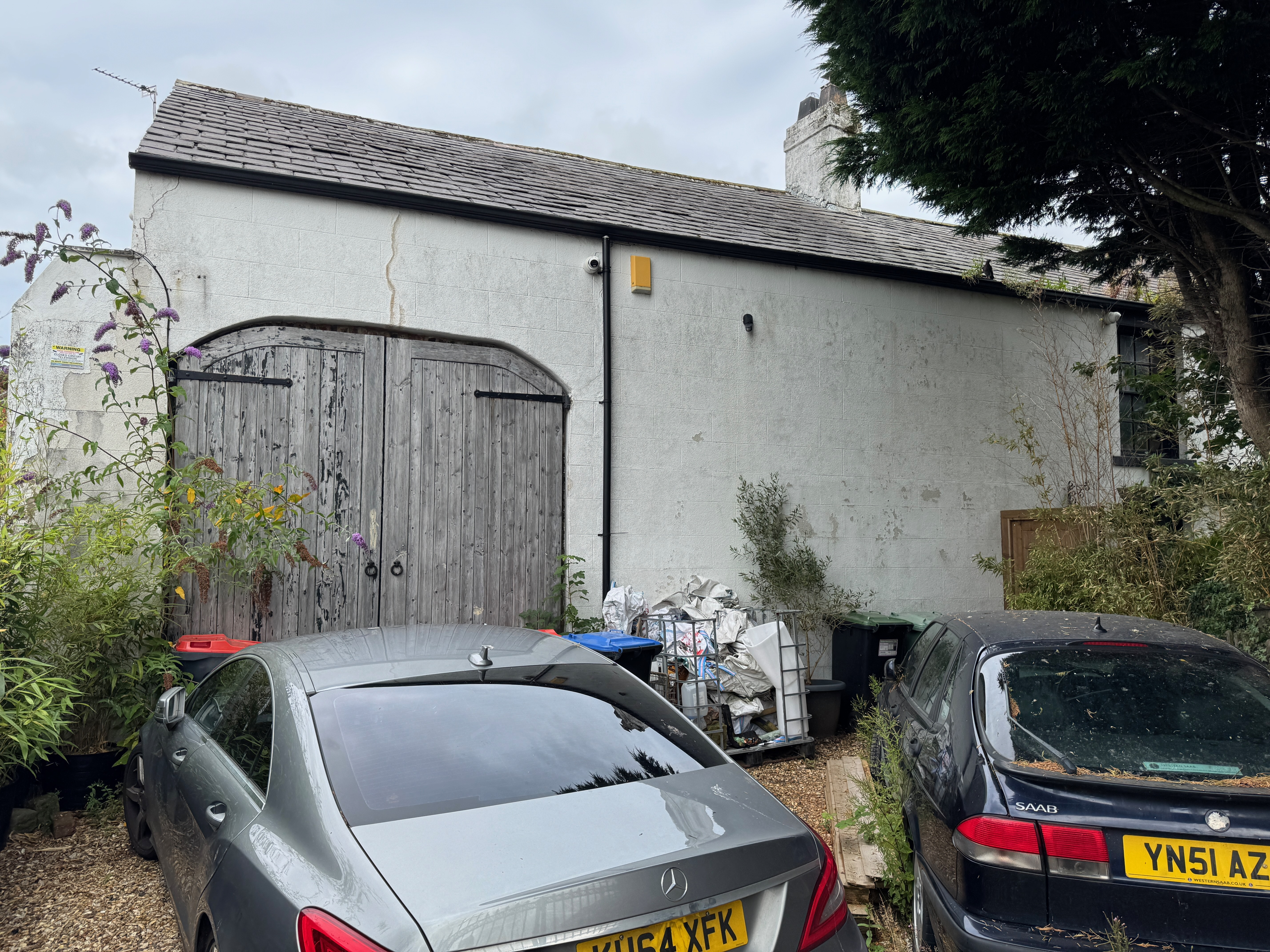
Barn, viewed from Rossendale Avenue North

== See also ==
- Listed buildings in Thornton-Cleveleys
