= Children's Corner (amusement park) =

Amusement park in Cleveleys, Lancashire, England

- A 1970s view of Children's Corner, looking north along North Promenade from the end of Victoria Road
- Interactive map of Children's Corner
- Location: Promenade, Cleveleys, Lancashire, England
- Coordinates: 53.87830°N 3.04714°W
- Status: Defunct
- Opened: 1961 (65 years ago)
- Closed: 2004 (22 years ago)
- Owner: Albert Mason Sr.

Attractions
- Total: "Alpine Glide" helter skelter "Monte Carlo Rally" classic cars

Children's Corner, also known as Kiddie's Corner, was a small amusement park located in Cleveleys, Lancashire, England. It stood at the western end of Victoria Road, on Cleveleys Promenade, between 1961 and 2004.

The park opened in 1961 on land known as The Arena. It was originally owned by the council, but Albert Mason Sr., owner of nearby Olympia Family Amusements, purchased a lease to run it in late 1960; it opened the following year.

Its two most popular attractions were the "Alpine Glide" helter skelter and the "Monte Carlo Rally" classic-car ride, which featured electronically driven cars on a track, allowing children to believe they were driving them.

In 2001, a new ride called the Jumping Star was opened.

After its closure in 2004, the park was demolished as part of work on the town's sea defences. A concrete seating arena now occupies the location.

== Attractions ==
A closer view of the helter skelter and car ride, 1970s

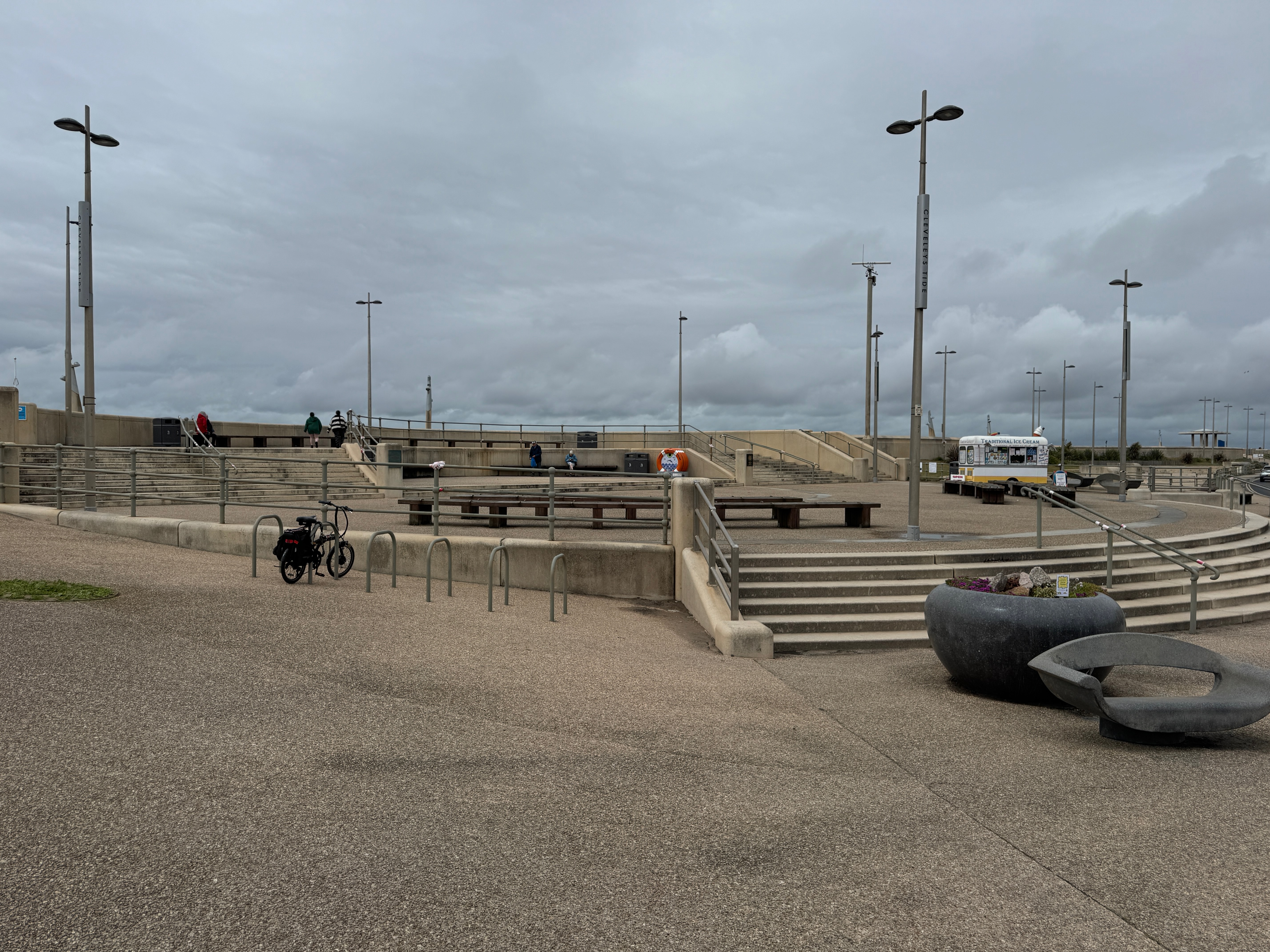
The same view in 2024
