= Poolfoot Cottage =

Historic building in Lancashire, England

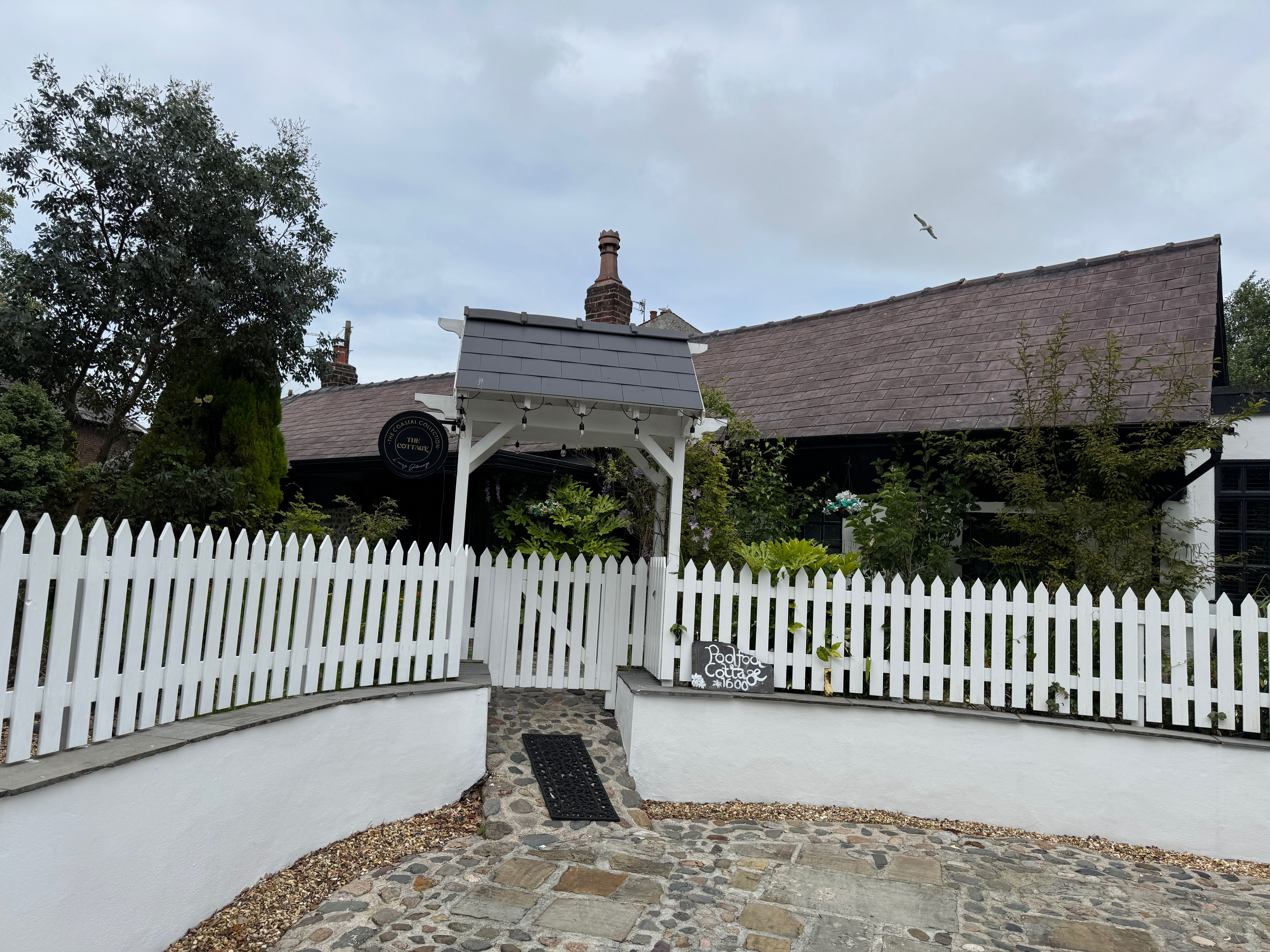
- Viewed from Heys Street

- Location within the Borough of Wyre Location within Lancashire Location within England
- 53.882247°N 3.007792°W
- Location: Thornton-Cleveleys, Lancashire, England

History
- Built: 1694 (332 years ago)

Site notes
- Area: Borough of Wyre

Listed Building – Grade II
- Designated: 16 August 1983
- Reference no.: 1281132

Poolfoot Cottage is a historic building on Heys Street in Thornton-Cleveleys, Lancashire, England. Originally a pair of cottages, the buildings were later converted into a single dwelling. It has cobble walls, now rendered and whitewashed, with a slate roof. It is in a single storey with five bays. The windows vary and include French windows, a sliding sash window, and a bay window. On the front is a modern porch.

== Gallery ==
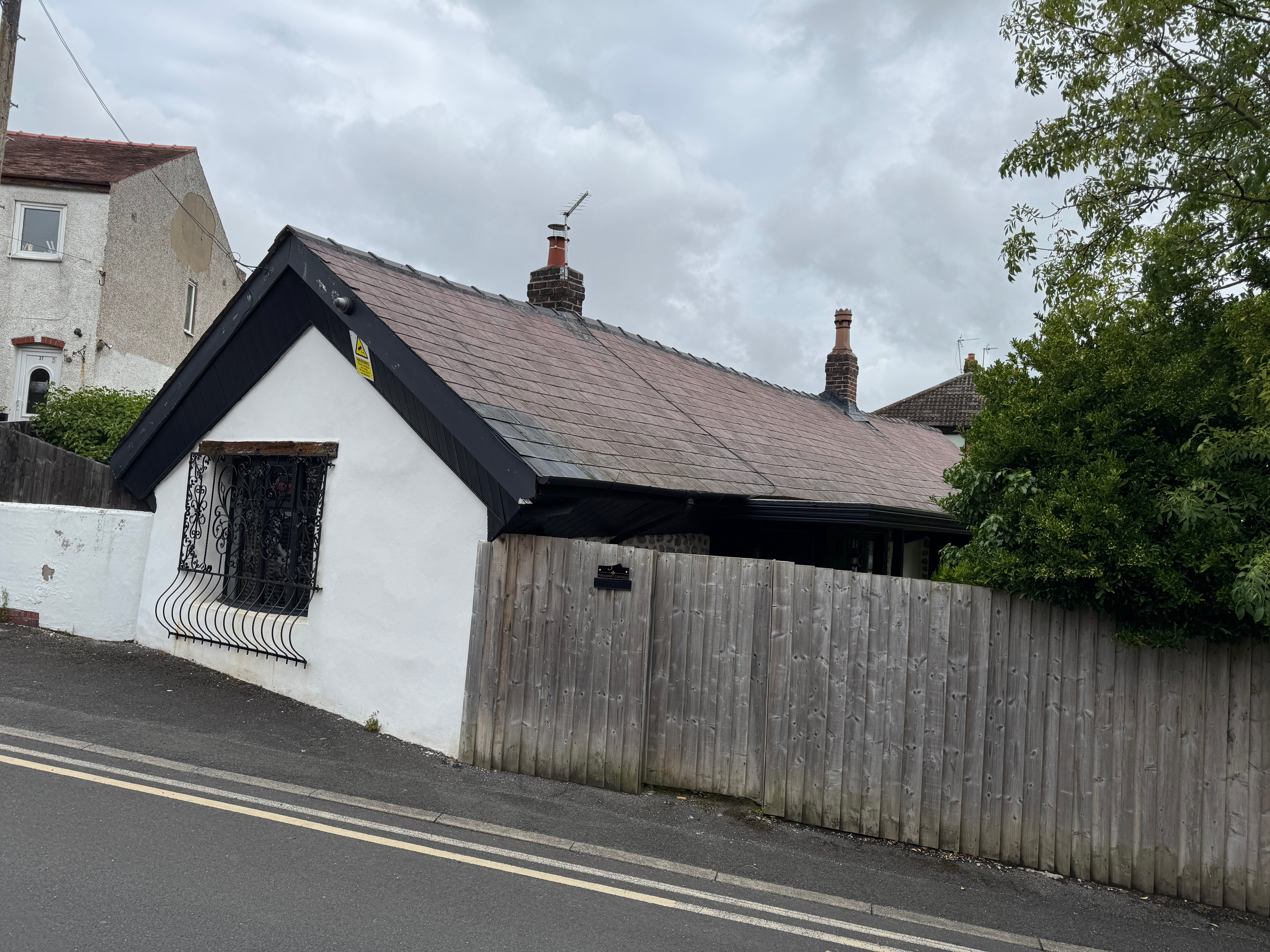
Gable end, viewed from Crabtree Road

== See also ==
- Listed buildings in Thornton-Cleveleys
