= Victoria Road, Thornton-Cleveleys =

Road in Lancashire, England

Coordinates: 53.874434°N 3.023875°W

Victoria Road
- Ramper Road (formerly)
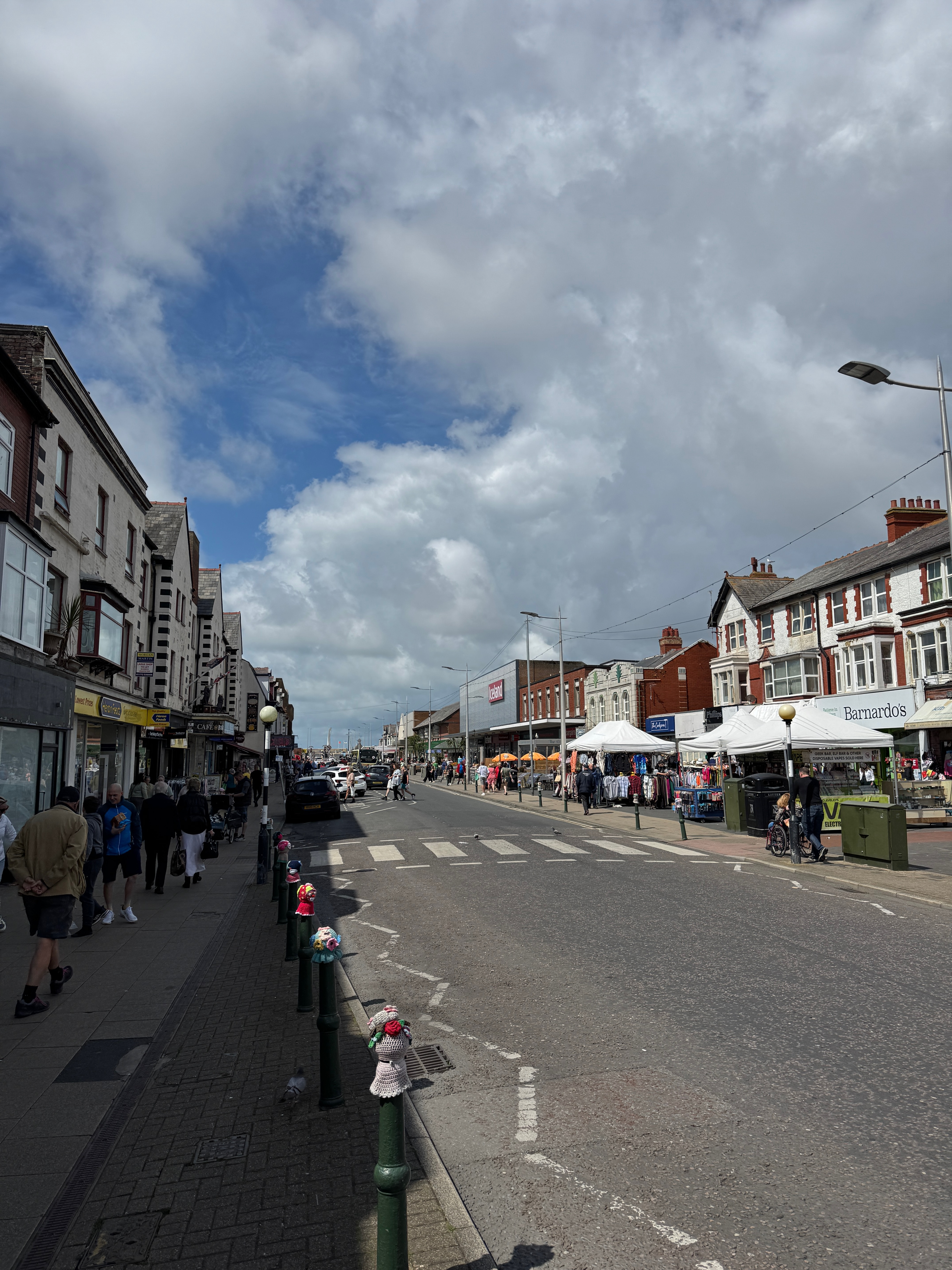
- Victoria Road West in Cleveleys
- Interactive map of Victoria Road
- Length: 2 mi (3.2 km)
- Location: Thornton-Cleveleys, Lancashire
- East end: Station Road
- West end: South Promenade

Victoria Road is a major thoroughfare in Thornton-Cleveleys, Lancashire, England. Originally known as Ramper Road, it runs for about 2 miles (3.2 km) from Station Road in Thornton, in the east, to South Promenade in Cleveleys, in the west. Its addresses are denoted as "Victoria Road East" or "Victoria Road West", the split occurring at the Amounderness Way roundabout carrying traffic of the A585 between Poulton-le-Fylde and Fleetwood. The road picks up the B5412 designation from Station Road until The Crescent and Brighton Avenue (the A587) in Cleveleys.

Blackpool Tramway crosses Victoria Road West at the junction of Rossall Road, The Crescent and Brighton Avenue in Cleveleys.

The westernmost section of Victoria Road, in Cleveleys, is known for its plethora of cafes. This section is often called the "jewel in Wyre's crown", although Victoria Road West received widespread support for road-safety improvements in 2023.

== History ==
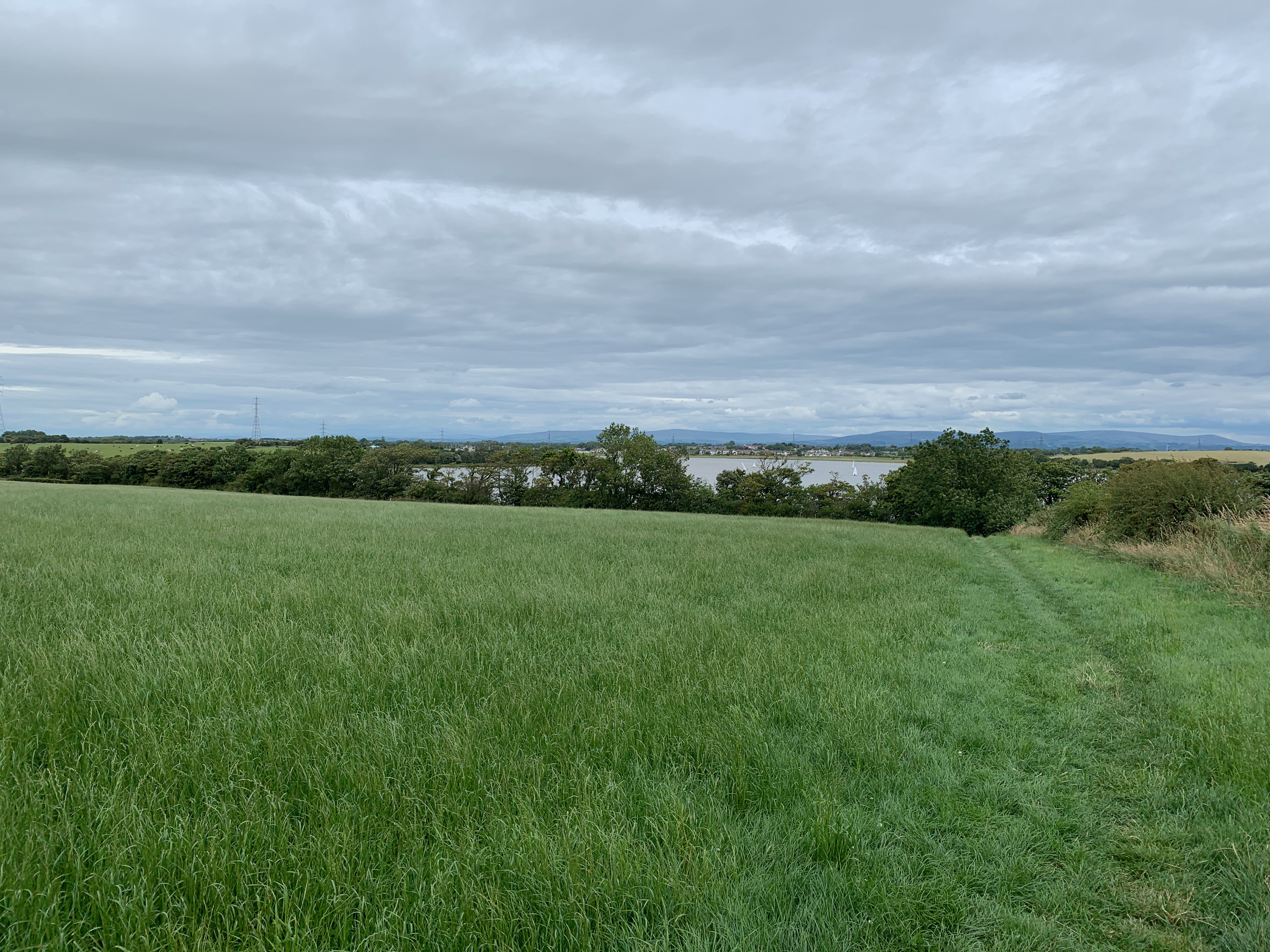
The footpath in view follows the former route of a Roman road down to the River Wyre

According to Ben Bowman of the Blackpool Gazette and Herald: "At Cleveleys there was no highway to Thornton until Ramper Road (now Victoria Road) was constructed of gravel over the marsh to Thornton, under an order called the Marsh Act Award of 1805," but a 1786 William Yates map shows Ramper Road was already in place. It is possible that the road continued almost exactly 1 mile (1.6 km) beyond its current eastern terminus to Bulker Ford at Skippool Creek, which is believed to have been a Roman crossing over the River Wyre to Hambleton.

A river, believed to be a distributary of the River Wyre, once followed the route of Victoria Road. Borehole samples have provided evidence of a major watercourse.

== Junctions ==
Victoria Road forms junctions with the below major roads (listed from east to west):

- Fleetwood Road (at Four Lane Ends) (B5268)
- Amounderness Way (A585)
- North Drive
- The Crescent, Brighton Avenue and Rossall Road (all the A587)

== Notable landmarks ==
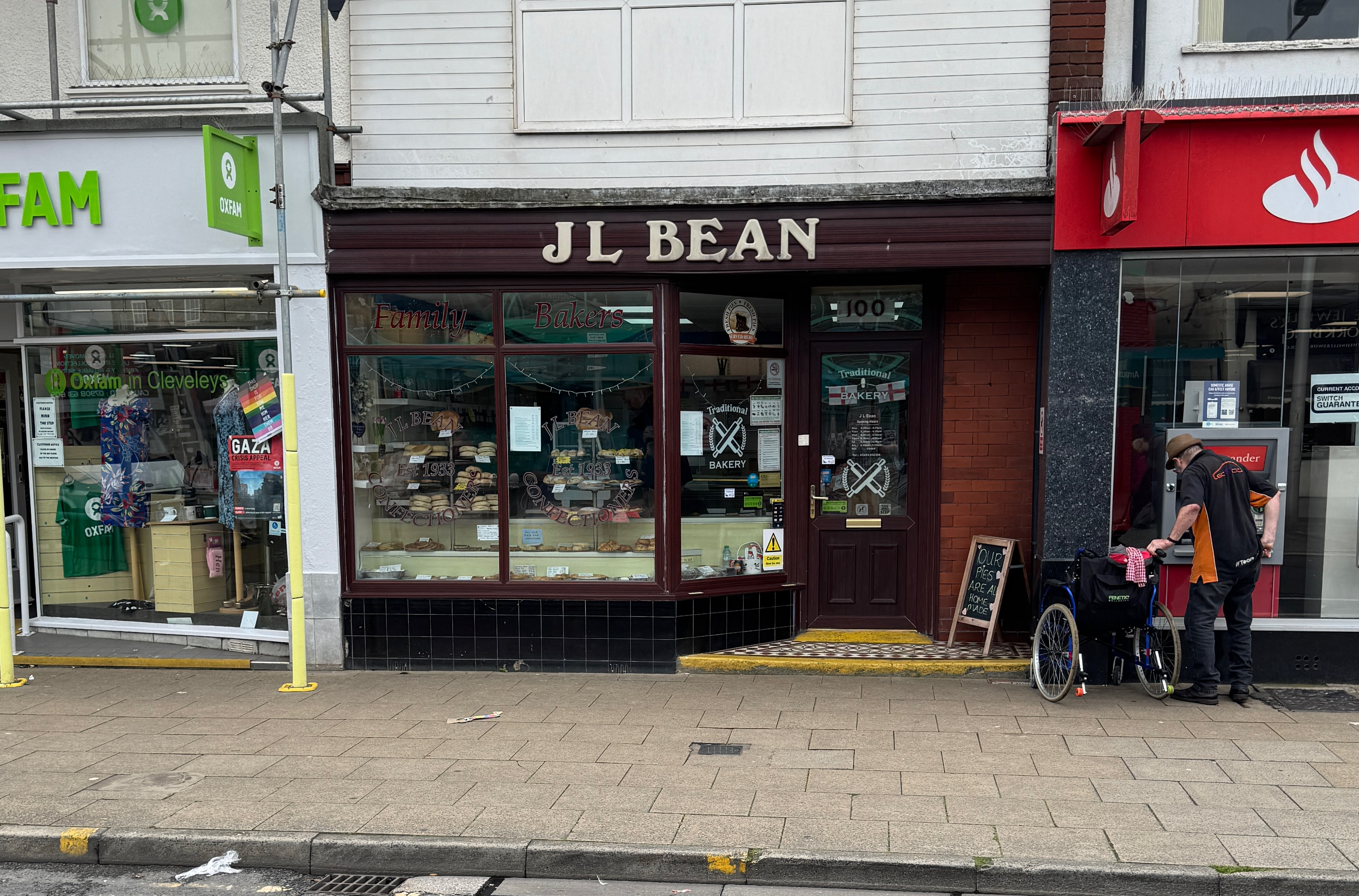
J. L. Bean, pictured during its 92nd year in business

- Thornton Centre
- Thornton Library
- Thornton Sports Centre
- Marsh Farmhouse (built in 1803; Grade II listed)
- Victoria Hotel
- Cleveleys Hotel (demolished)
- The Regal Hotel

J. L. Bean Bakers is the oldest shop on Victoria Road West. It has been in business since 1933.

Neal's Family Bakery on Victoria Road West was established in 1938. It announced plans to close in March 2024, but was saved by a new owner.

=== Business closures ===
Fredericks, a clothing store established in 1989, closed in 2024.

Victoria Road West's TSB Bank was one of seventy branches which closed in 2022.

Argos closed its Victoria Road West store in 2020, one of 120 such closures nationwide.

== Public transportation ==
Victoria Road is served by Blackpool Transport's routes 7A and 75, Transpora's routes 24, 648 and 660 and Archway Travel's 526.

== See also ==
- Ramper Road railway station
