= A586 road =

Road in England

A586

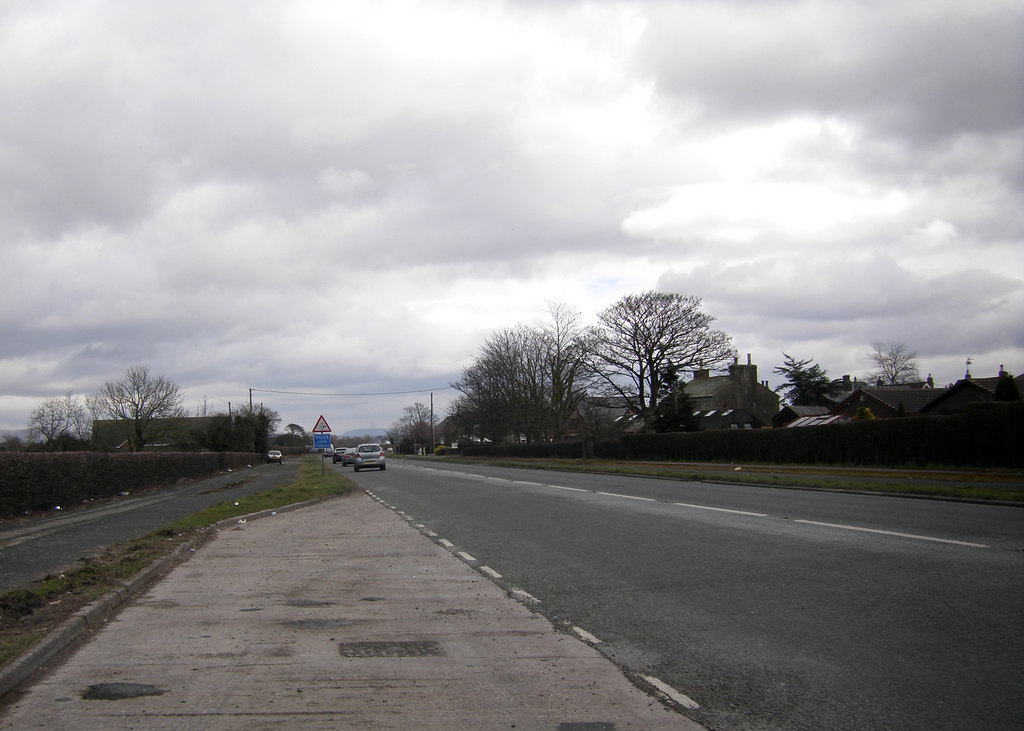

Route information
- Length: 13 mi (21 km)

Location
- Country: United Kingdom
- Constituent country: England

Road network
- Roads in the United Kingdom; Motorways; A and B road zones

The A586 is a road in Lancashire, England, which runs from Garstang to Blackpool.

The road runs a total distance of 13 miles (21 km), in a roughly east–west direction, and is both urban and rural in character. It begins near Churchtown (53.8813°N 2.7804°W), south of Garstang and just east of Catterall, as a junction on the A6 Preston Lancaster New Road, immediately to the north of Kirkland Bridge. It runs as a winding rural single-lane road 2 miles (3.2 km) south west to St Michael's on Wyre, where it crosses the River Wyre. Becoming Garstang Road, it runs west, bypassing Great Eccleston and Little Eccleston, and sharing with the A585 as Garstang New Road between Larbreck and Little Singleton, about 4 miles (6.4 km) past St Michael's on Wyre. This is a wider, straighter stretch of road. The road splits from the A585 after approximately 1 mile (1.6 km), at the Five Lane Ends in Little Singleton, and enters the outskirts of Poulton-le-Fylde as Garstang Road East. From here, the road becomes progressively more urban as it reaches the suburbs of Blackpool. After 3.5 miles (5.6 km), as Poulton Road it crosses the A587 at the Plymouth Road roundabout, and becomes Westcliffe Drive as it passes through Layton, and Talbot Road shortly after. The road continues as Talbot Road past Blackpool North railway station and the former Blackpool bus station, and passes through the town centre one-way system, eventually terminating at Talbot Square (53.8188°N 3.0558°W), where it meets the A584 and A583 next to the North Pier.
