= List of highways numbered 587 =

The following highways are numbered 587:

== United Kingdom ==
- A587 road

== United States ==
- I-587
  - Future I-587 (proposed)
- SR 587
- LA 587
- MD 587
- MS 587
- SR 587
- FM 587

Preceded by 586	Lists of highways 587	Succeeded by 588
