= Cleveleys bus station =

Bus station in Cleveleys, Lancashire, England

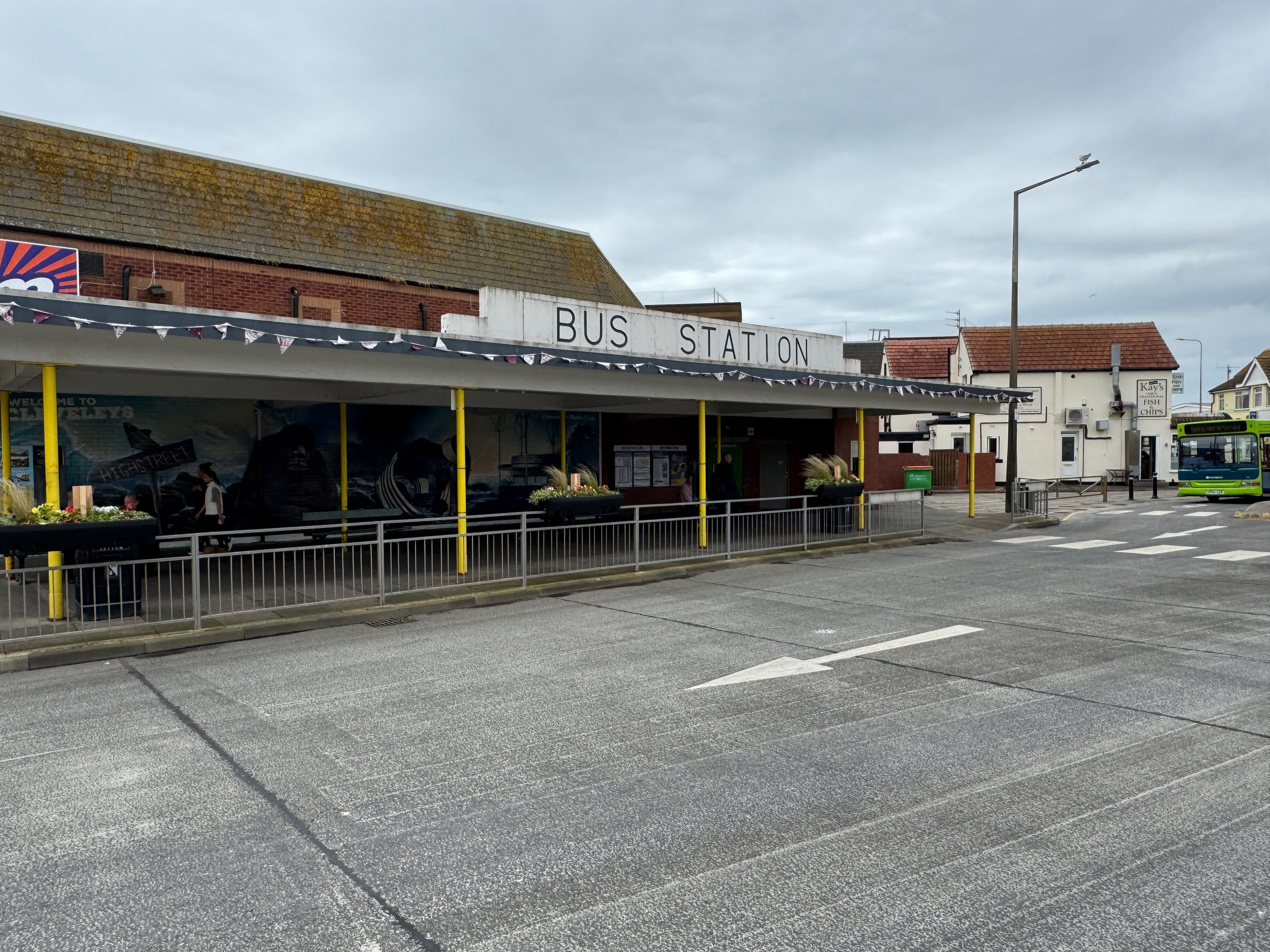
- The station in 2024.

General information
- Location: Rough Lea Road, Cleveleys, England
- Coordinates: 53.878439°N 3.045003°W
- Operator: Wyre Council
- Bus stands: 5
- Bus operators: Blackpool Transport, Transpora
- Connections: 5, 7, 7a, 24

History
- Opened: 1932 (94 years ago)
Location
- Location within Lancashire

Cleveleys bus station is located on Rough Lea Road in Cleveleys, Lancashire, England. Built in 1932, and serving several local towns, the station has five stands.

== History ==
The station was built by Thornton Cleveleys Urban District in 1932, and was used by Ribble Motor Services buses initially. Blackpool Corporation buses began serving it in 1940.

In 2024, a mural with a Star Wars theme was unveiled inside the station, after nearby Cleveleys beach was used as a location for the American television series Andor. Christian Fenn was the artist.

The station was refurbished in 2012.

== Services ==
Blackpool Transport's Blackpool-bound routes 5, 7 and 7A, Transpora's routes 24 (Fleetwood and Blackpool via Poulton-le-Fylde), 568 and 660 serve the bus station.

== See also ==
- Public transport in the Fylde
