= List of highways numbered 588 =

The following highways are numbered 588:

== United Kingdom ==
- A588 road

== United States ==
Maryland

- MD 588
- SR 588
- PA 588
- FM 588

Territories

- Puerto Rico Highway 588

Preceded by 587	Lists of highways 588	Succeeded by 589
