= A583 road =

Preston to Blackpool road in England

Coordinates: 53.7782°N 2.8674°W

A583

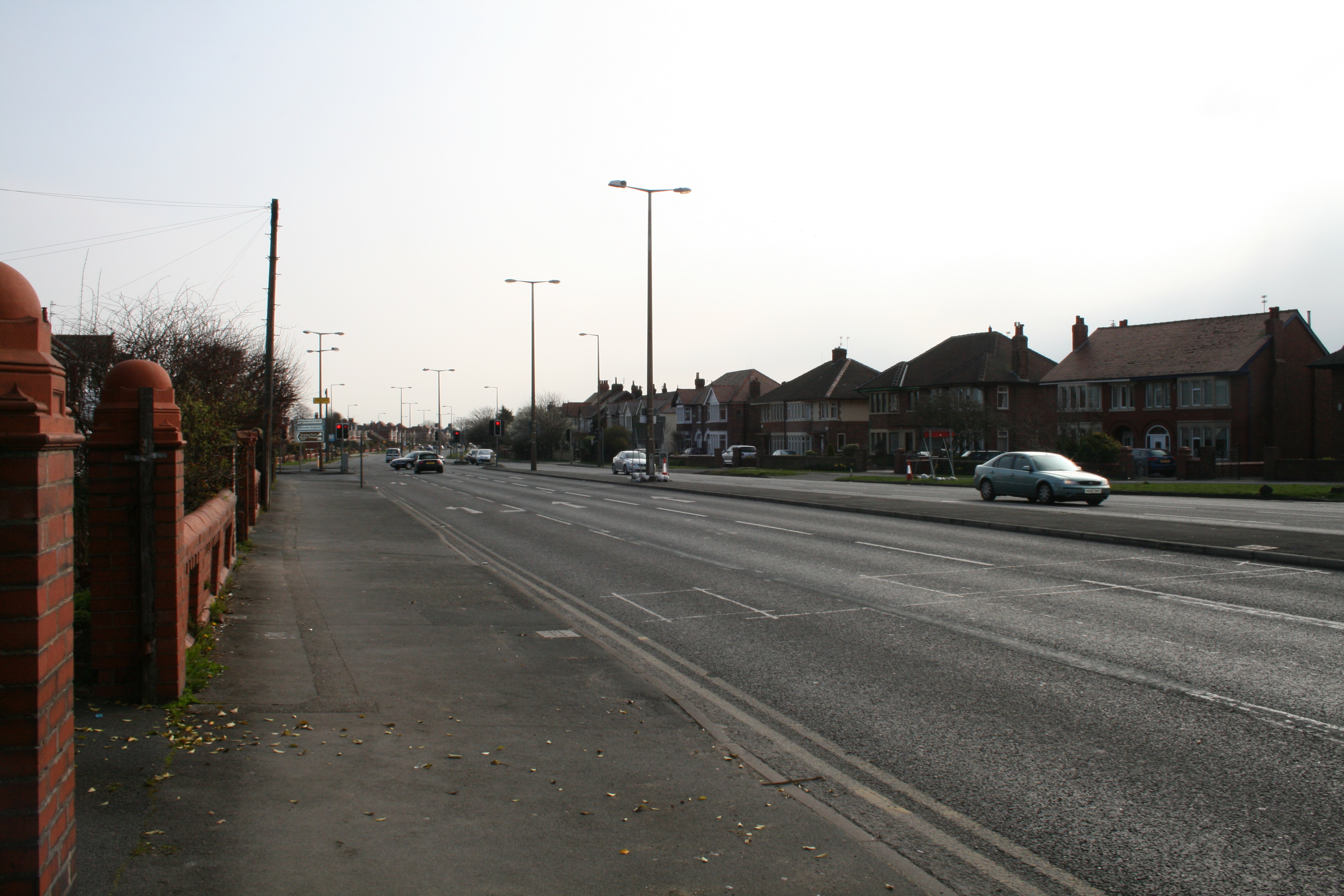
- Preston New Road in Blackpool, looking towards Preston

Route information
- Length: 17 mi (27 km)

Major junctions
- East end: A59 – Preston
- A5071; A5072; A5085 / A582; A584; A585; M55 / A5230; A587 / A5073; A586

- West end: A584 – Blackpool

Location
- Country: United Kingdom

Road network
- Roads in the United Kingdom; Motorways; A and B road zones

The A583 is a primary road from Preston to Blackpool in England, via Kirkham. It runs a distance of 17 miles (27.4 km), and was previously the main route into Blackpool until the construction of the M55 motorway.

== Route ==
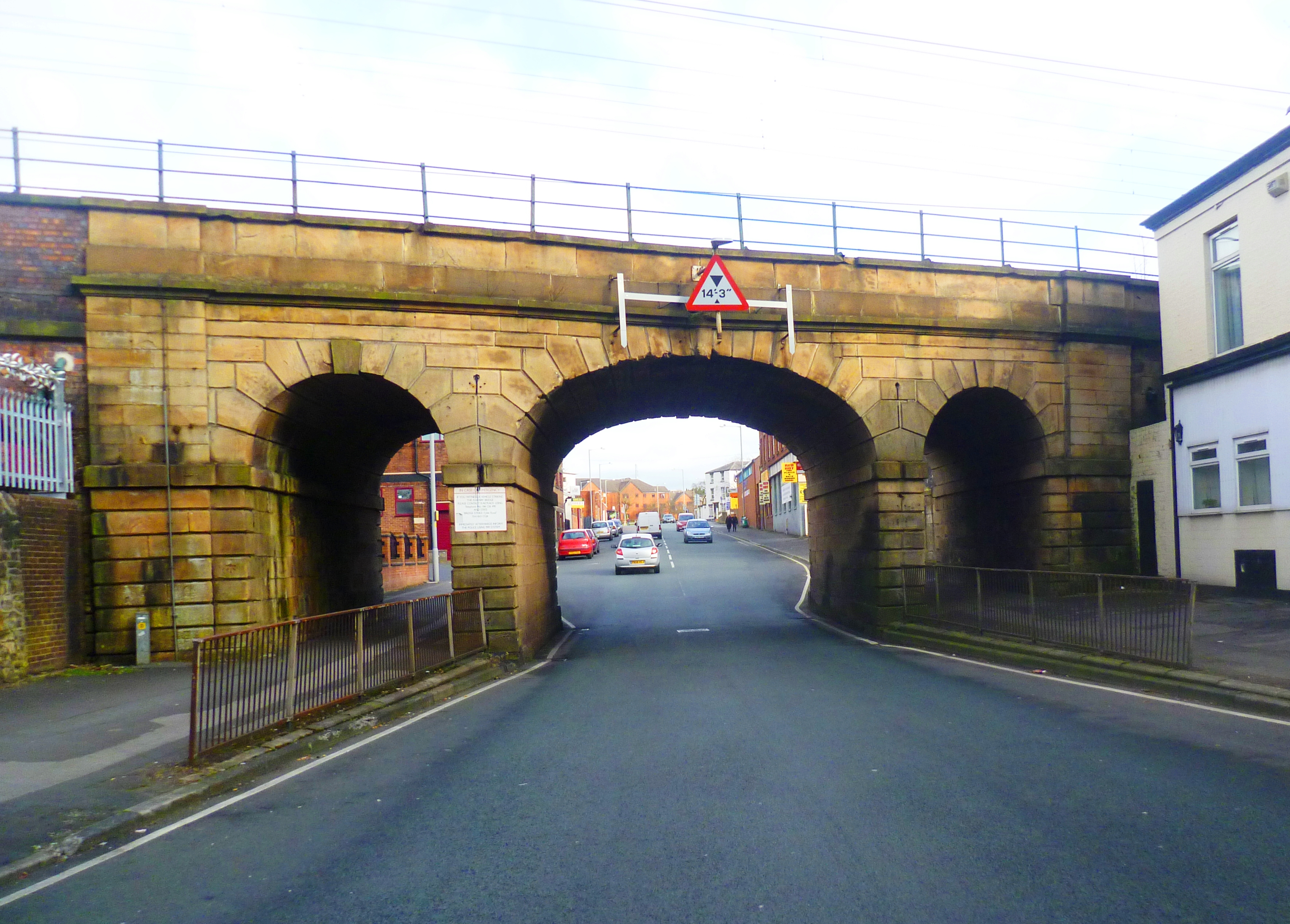
Fylde Road into Preston

The A583 runs from the A59 Ring Way in Preston city centre to Blackpool town centre, terminating near the town's North Pier. It is mostly a primary route, although there are non-primary sections in the urban areas at both ends of the route.

The road begins as Friargate and heads out of the city centre as Fylde Road, becoming Watery Lane after passing under the Blackpool Branch Lines to meet the A5072. As Watery Lane, it becomes a dual carriageway and acts as a bypass for the Riversway Docklands and the Ashton-on-Ribble area. After becoming Riversway, it then merges with the A5085 Blackpool Road and continues west as Blackpool Road, shortly before the A584 branches off towards Lytham St Annes. The road passes around the villages of Clifton and Newton-with-Scales as Blackpool Road before reaching the market town of Kirkham. The road's original route passed through Kirkham until 1936, when the Kirkham bypass was built taking the road around the south side of the town. After passing Kirkham, the road continues as Blackpool Road to meet the A585 and B5259 at a roundabout close to Kirkham Grammar School and Ribby Hall Holiday Village. It continues west towards Blackpool, becoming Preston New Road shortly before a crossroads with the B5260. Three miles (4.8 km) further on it meets the B5410, and junction 4 of the M55 motorway shortly after, entering the District of Blackpool in doing so. As Preston New Road it travels around the edge of the Mereside estate and through Marton before reaching the large Oxford Square junction, where the A587, A5073 and B5390 all join it. The A583 then loses its primary status, heading north as Whitegate Drive to the Devonshire Square junction where it meets the B5124 and B5266. It then turns west and heads into the town centre as Church Street, where the B5390 rejoins it. After passing through part of the town centre along Church Street and Abingdon Street it terminates at Talbot Square, where North Pier and the town's war memorial are located, as well as the Town Hall. At this terminus it, along with the A586, joins the A584, the road which joined the A583 near Preston.

Major junctions on the road are the A5085 Blackpool Road at Lea, the A584 at Clifton, the A585 west of Kirkham, the western terminus of the M55 motorway just outside Blackpool where the A5230 also terminates, the A5073/A587 in Marton, and the A584/A586 in Blackpool town centre.

== History ==
The 13-mile (21 km) Clifton to Blackpool section of the A583 was formerly a privately owned toll road owned by the Clifton and De Hoghton estates. The tolls were abolished in 1902, when it became a main road as a result of an agreement made by Lancashire County Council and Fylde Rural District three years earlier which also saw the construction of new sections of road at Clifton and Blackpool.

The increased use of private cars, buses and charabancs in the 1920s, and the poor condition of the road, made it one of Lancashire County Council's priorities in its road improvement schemes. The Blackpool to Clifton section of the road was reconstructed between 1929 and 1936, and as part of the reconstruction project bypasses were built to take the road around Kirkham and the centre of Clifton.

The route of the A583 changed again in the mid 20th century, when the Riversway section of the road was constructed to bypass the Ashton-on-Ribble area of Preston. Its previous route now forms parts of the A5085 and A5072.

== Preston Western Distributor Road ==
Until 2023 the M55 had no Junction 2. As part of a City Deal signed between Preston City Council and central Government in late 2013, both Lancashire County Council and Preston City Council agreed in principle to build a 'Preston Western Distributor Road' which would link the A583/A584 outside Clifton to a new Junction 2 of the M55.

Construction of the new road began in September 2019 and involved a new motorway junction, four new bridges and two viaducts. Completion of the £200m scheme was scheduled for early in 2023 and the road opened on 3 July 2023.
