= Blackpool bus station =

Bus station in Blackpool, England (1939–2002)

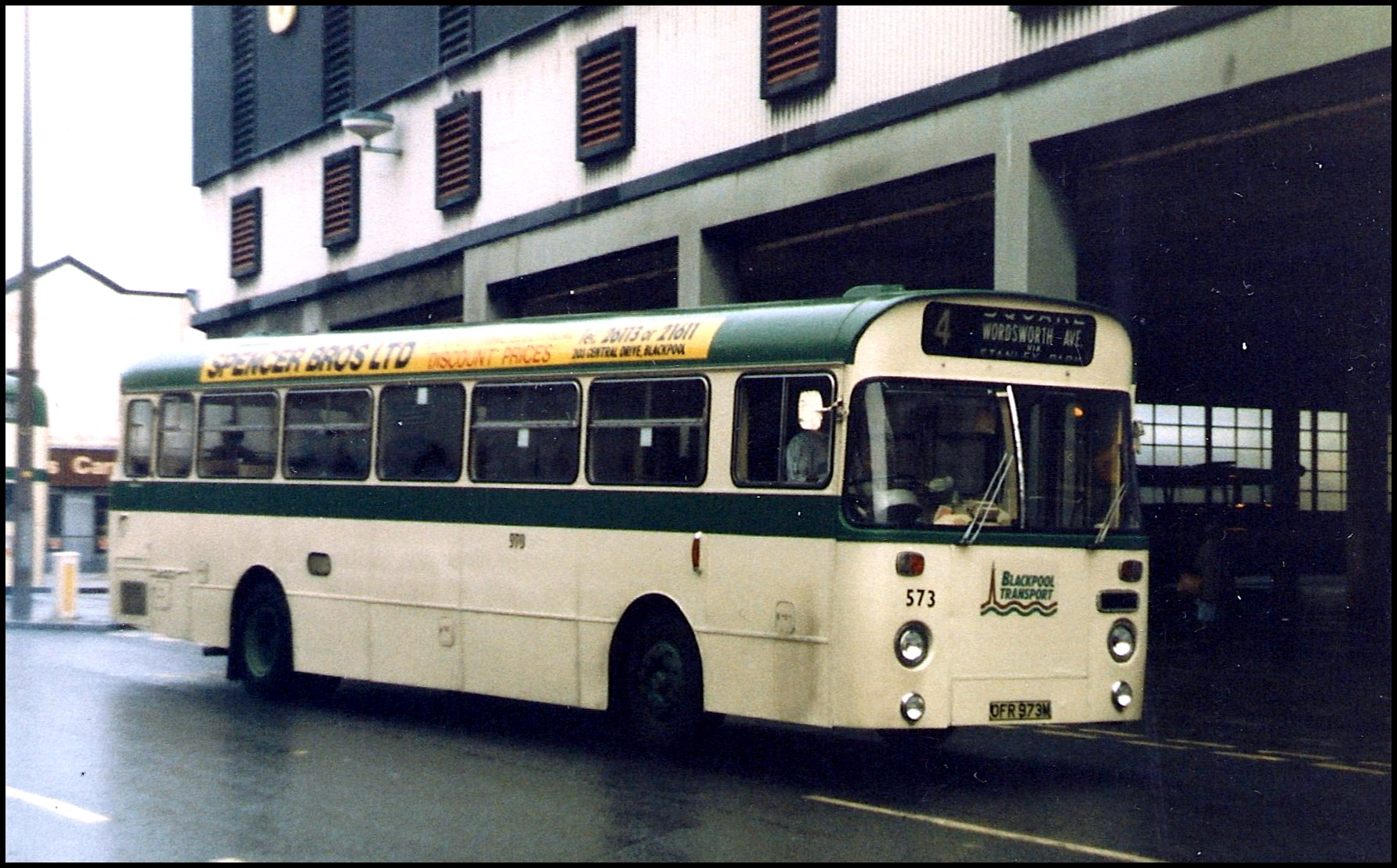
- Blackpool Transport's route 4 leaving the bus station en route to Wordsworth Avenue in the 1980s

General information
- Other names: Talbot Road bus station
- Location: Talbot Road, Blackpool, England
- Coordinates: 53.820221°N 3.049855°W
- Operator: Blackpool Borough Council
- Connections: Blackpool North railway station (200 metres (220 yd))

History
- Opened: 1939 (87 years ago)
- Closed: 2002 (24 years ago)
Location
- Location within Lancashire

Blackpool bus station (known colloquially as Talbot Road bus station) was a bus station located on Talbot Road in Blackpool, Lancashire, England. The building, which is bounded by Talbot Road to the north, Cookson Street (the A586) to the east, Deansgate to the south and Topping Street to the west, is now a gym.

Built in 1939, as the ground floor of a multi-story car park on land known as Talbot Mews, the bus station was taken out of use in 2002. It was preceded by an open-air motor-coach station.

In 2019, the town completed the Blackpool Bus Hub, on Market Street and Corporation Street, from which run Blackpool Transport's routes 5, 5A, 5B, 5C, 6, 7, 7A, 11, 11A, 11B and 14, and Stagecoach Cumbria & North Lancashire's routes 61 and 68.

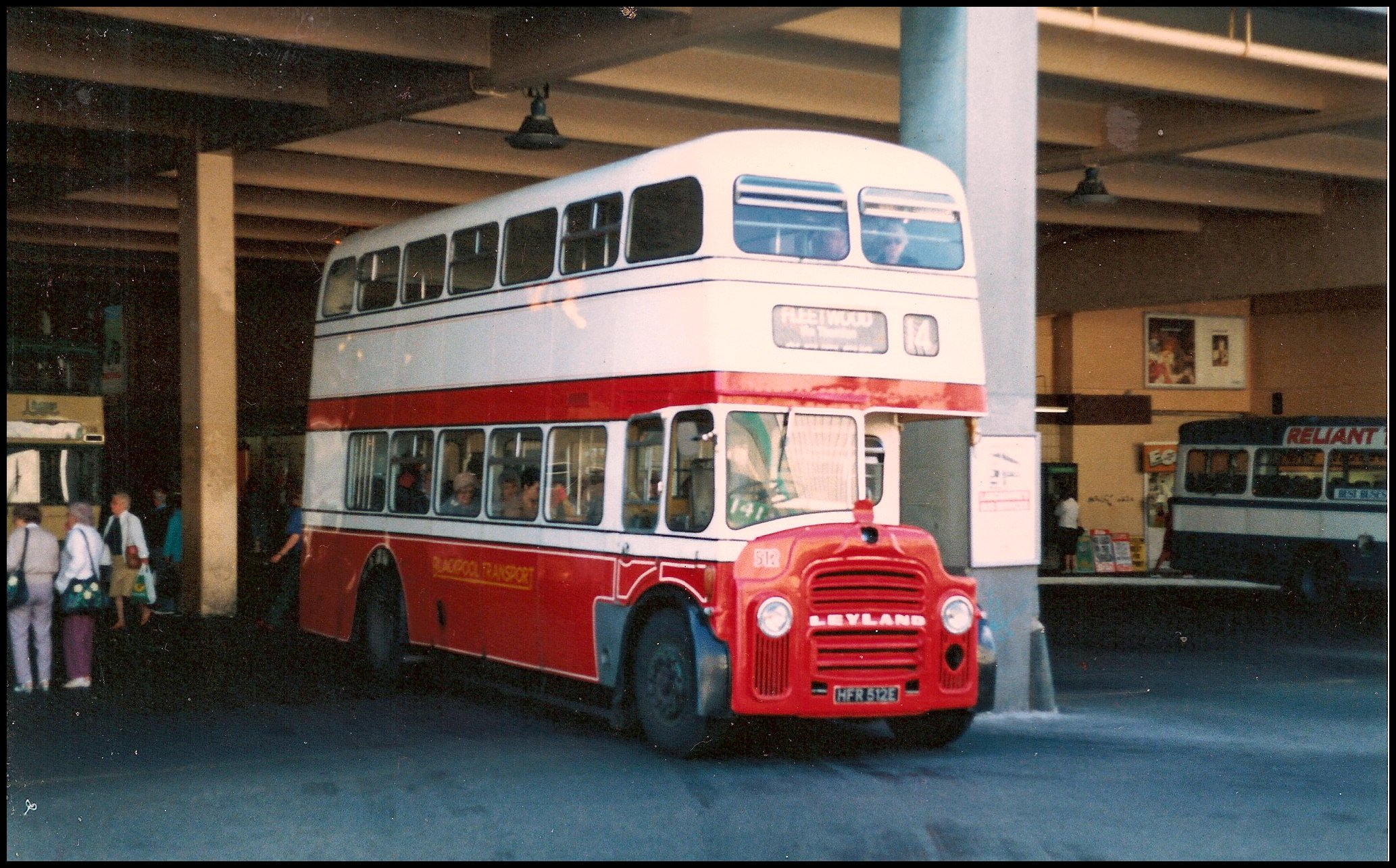
Blackpool Transport's route 14 at the bus station in the 1980s, en route to Fleetwood

== See also ==
- Public transport in the Fylde
