= M55 motorway =

Preston–Blackpool motorway in England

M55

- M55 highlighted in blue Shown with North West England motorway network Shown with UK motorway network

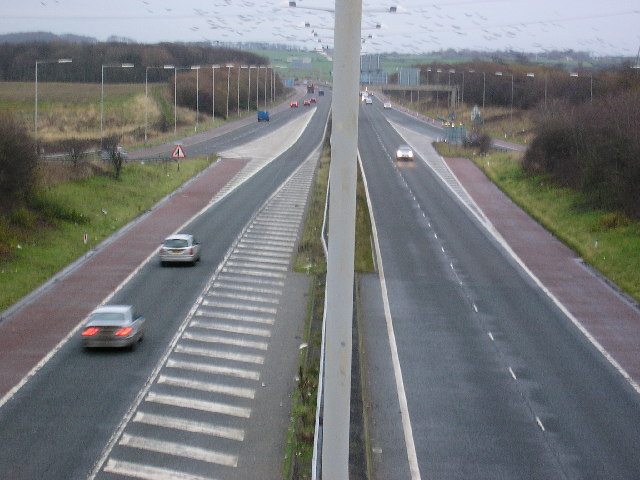
- Looking east from Junction 4, 2005

Route information
- Maintained by National Highways
- Length: 12.2 mi (19.6 km)
- Existed: 1958–present
- History: 1958: First mile opened as part of M6 Preston bypass; 1975: Remainder opened as M55; 2023: Junction 2 added

Major junctions
- East end: Fulwood
- M6 motorway
- West end: Blackpool

Location
- Country: United Kingdom
- Counties: Lancashire
- Primary destinations: Preston; Blackpool

Road network
- Roads in the United Kingdom; Motorways; A and B road zones
| ← M54 | → M56 |

The M55 is a motorway in Lancashire, England, which can also be referred to as the Preston Northern Bypass. It connects the seaside resort of Blackpool to the M6 at Preston. It is 12.2 miles (19.6 km) in length.

One mile (1.6 km) was originally built in 1958 as part of the UK's first motorway, the Preston Bypass, and the remainder was built in 1975.

== Route ==
The M55 has three lanes in both directions for most of its length. After leaving the M6 at junction 32, the road immediately interchanges with the A6 and then crosses the West Coast Main Line. It meets the A582 extension, built in 2023, at junction 2, then crosses the Lancaster Canal before passing north of Wesham to meet the A585 at junction 3. It then continues west in a rural setting to meet A583 at junction 4, where the motorway ends and becomes the A5230. The western part of the M55, and the first few hundred metres of the A5230, occupy the route of the old Blackpool Branch railway line.

== History ==
- The section from the M6 to junction 1 opened as part of the M6 Preston Bypass in 1958.
- The section between junctions 1 and 4 opened in 1975.

The first motorway constructed in Great Britain was the M6 Preston Bypass, opened in 1958. This ran from the current M6 junction 29 to the M55 junction 1. It was built as a two-lane route. In 1965 the M6 was extended north from what is the current day junction 32 to meet the Lancaster Bypass, and the M6 junction was rebuilt to its current design to connect the A6 at the now M55 junction 1. Due to increasing traffic, it was decided to provide a motorway link to Blackpool and this road was opened in 1975.

Some of the material for backfilling the new M55 was obtained from a nearby disused airfield at RNAS Inskip, where the runways were broken up and the land returned to agriculture. More material came from the Tootle Heights quarries in Longridge.

=== Junction 2 ===
Until 2023, the motorway had no junction 2. A proposed South Ribble link road would have involved the extension of the M65 motorway around the west of Preston to link to the M55 at the missing junction. The link road proposal has been dormant since the mid-1990s. Between 1993 and 1995, the M6 around the east of Preston was widened to four lanes, making the link road proposal less likely.

As part of a City Deal signed between Preston City Council and central Government in late 2013, both Lancashire County Council and Preston City Council agreed in principle to build a 'Preston Western Distributor Road' which would link the A583/A584 outside Clifton to a new junction 2 of the M55.

Construction of the new road began in September 2019 and involved a new motorway junction at Medlar, four new bridges and two viaducts. The £200 million scheme was completed in July 2023 and was named Edith Rigby Way. Moto Hospitality submitted plans to Preston City Council in December 2024 to build a services station off junction 2.

== Incidents ==
=== Aircraft test landing ===
On 26 April 1975, during work to extend the motorway, a test was conducted, by test pilot Tim Ferguson, using a Jaguar military jet aircraft from nearby Warton Aerodrome, to prove the viability of using the road as a makeshift runway in time of war. Jaguar XX109 was the second production model. Ferguson was the deputy chief test pilot of BAC Warton. The demonstration was not publicised, in the interests of public safety, but many spectators crossed the fields and gathered on the banks at the side of the motorway to watch.

== Junctions ==
The entire route is in the ceremonial county of Lancashire.

M55 motorway junctions
| Location | mi | km | Junction | Destinations | Notes |
|---|---|---|---|---|---|
| Preston | 0 | 0 | M6 J32 (Note: 53.8076°N 2.6984°W) | M6 – Manchester, Liverpool, Lancaster | Opened 1965 |
| Preston | 1.0 | 1.6 | 1 (Note: 53.8008°N 2.7167°W) | A6 – Preston (N), Garstang | Opened 1958, rebuilt 1975 |
| Preston | 3.4 | 5.5 | 2 (Note: 53.8000°N 2.7763°W) | A582 – Preston (S & W) | Opened 2023 |
| Medlar | 8.1 | 13.1 | 3 (Note: 53.8069°N 2.8896°W) | A585 – Kirkham, Fleetwood | Opened 1975 |
| Blackpool | 12.2 | 19.6 | 4 (Note: 53.7938°N 2.9849°W) | A583 – Kirkham, Blackpool A5230 – Lytham St Annes | Opened 1975 |
1.000 mi = 1.609 km; 1.000 km = 0.621 mi

Coordinate list

Junctions 3 and 4 are visual reporting points (VRPs) for general aviation aircraft in the surrounding Blackpool Airport airspace.

== See also ==
- List of motorways in the United Kingdom
