= Thornton-Cleveleys War Memorial =

Public sculpture by Albert Toft

- England
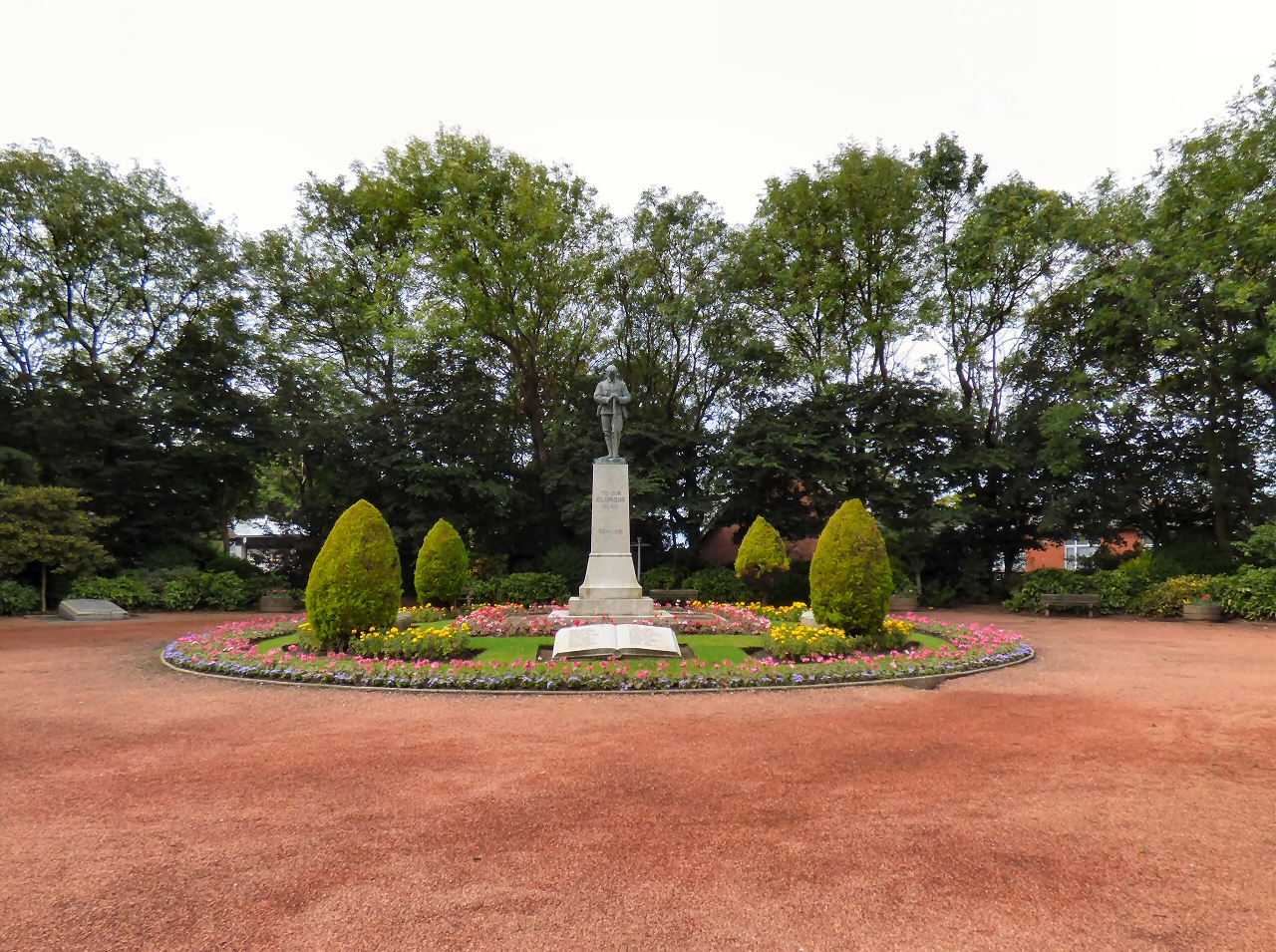
- Pictured in 2017
- For soldiers who died and served in World War I and World War II
- Unveiled: 1923 (103 years ago)
- Location: 53.87173°N 3.0107°W; Four Lane Ends, Thornton-Cleveleys, Lancashire, England
- Designed by: Albert Toft
- TO; OUR GLORIOUS; DEAD; 1914 – 1918

Erected in 1923, the Thornton-Cleveleys War Memorial is located in Thornton-Cleveleys, Lancashire, England. A Grade II listed structure, it stands in a small garden in the southwestern corner of a junction known as Four Lane Ends.

Designed by Albert Toft and sculpted by W. L. Cookson, the memorial consists of a bronze statue depicting a soldier standing with a rifle. The statue is on a square granite shaft, on a tapered plinth, on a base of two steps. On the shaft is an inscription and the names of those lost in the First World War. In front and at the sides of the memorial are three granite tablets in the form of open books with the names of those lost in the Second World War. Colonel Hugh Jeudwine was present at the memorial's unveiling on 11 November 1923.
