= Norcross Roundabout =

Roundabout in Lancashire, England

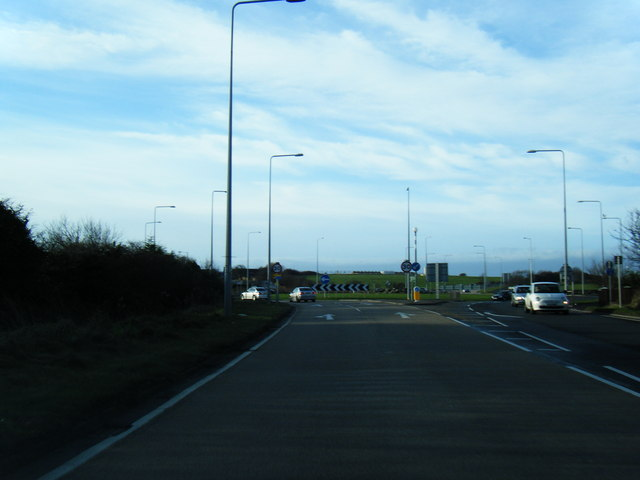
- Approaching the roundabout from the east on Amounderness Way, 2013

Location
- Thornton, Lancashire, England
- Coordinates: 53°51′52″N 3°00′36″W
- Roads at junction: A585; B5268

Construction
- Type: Roundabout
- Maintained by: National Highways

Location in Lancashire

Norcross Roundabout is a major traffic roundabout in the English village of Thornton, Lancashire. It was built at the junction of the A585, the B5268 Fleetwood Road South and Norcross Lane. As of 2020, an average of 28,000 vehicles utilise the roundabout each day.

The roundabout separates Thornton, to the north and northeast, from an area known as Norcross, beyond the roundabout to the southwest, and from Carleton to the south and southeast. It is part of a section of the A585 called Amounderness Way.

It is one of five roundabouts on Amounderness Way, the others being (from the southeast to the northwest): the Victoria Road Roundabout, between Thornton and Cleveleys; and three in Fleetwood, shortly before the road's northern terminus. The one to the east of Norcross Roundabout, known as the River Wyre Roundabout, was removed in 2021.

A major revamp of the roundabout, undertaken between July 2019 and April 2020, was described by motorists after its completion as "total hell", with a lack of signage cited as the main reason. Despite this, Carnell, the contractors who carried out the project, were shortlisted for Team of the Year at the national Chartered Institution of Highways and Transportation Awards. The project increased the size of the roundabout, including widening its approaches, as well as adding traffic lights. The project cost £12.3 million, funded by a national £220 million congestion relief programme.

Also in 2020, a study by Reach Data Unit named Norcross Roundabout the second-most-dangerous roundabout in Lancashire, after the A589 roundabout in Morecambe.
