= A584 road =

Road in England

Coordinates: 53.7458°N 3.0195°W

A584

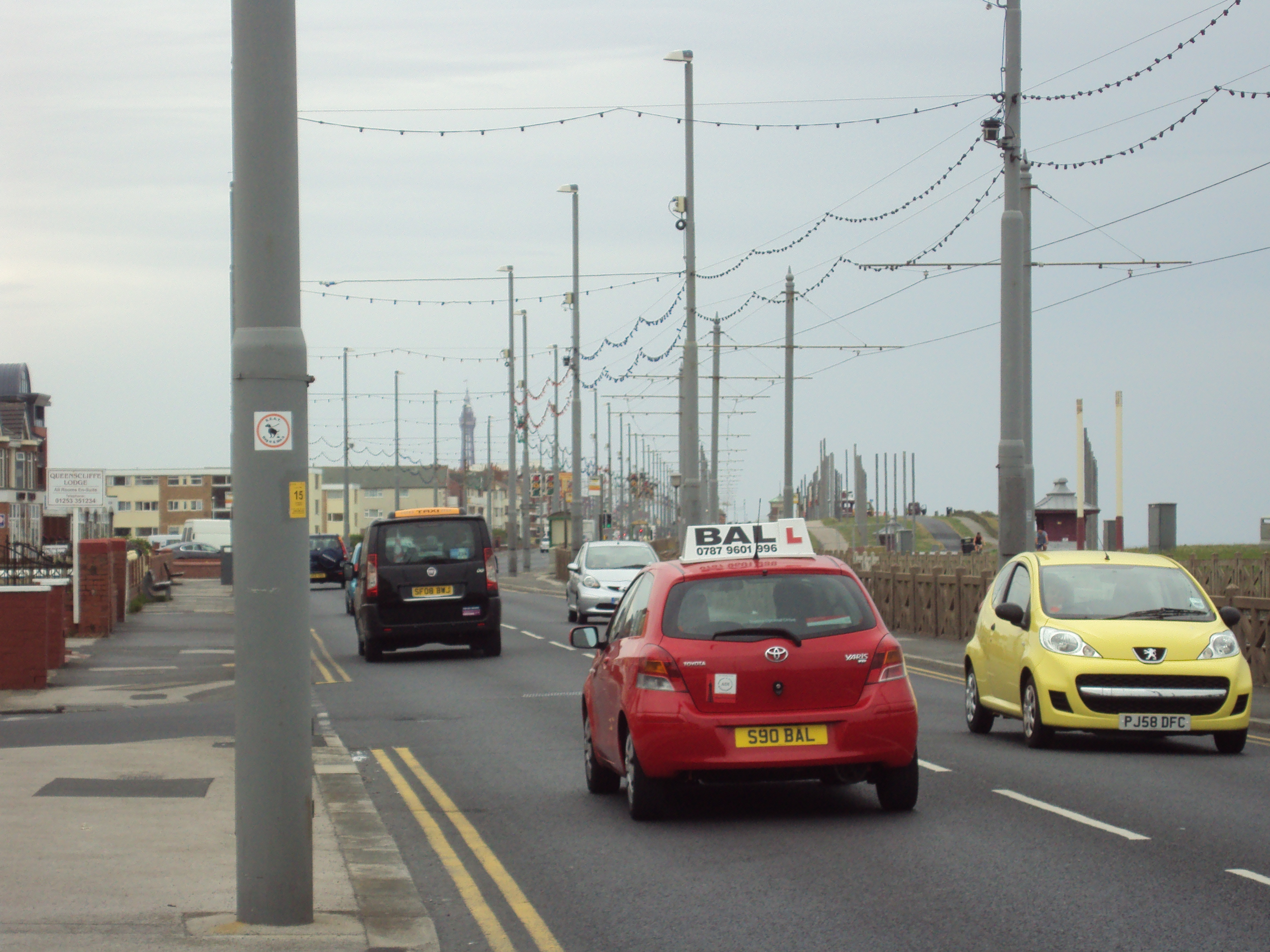
- Queen's Promenade, Bispham

Route information
- Length: 19 mi (31 km)

Location
- Country: United Kingdom
- Constituent country: England

Road network
- Roads in the United Kingdom; Motorways; A and B road zones
← A583	→ A585

The A584 (formerly Lamaleach Road) is a road in Lancashire, England, that runs from Clifton, near Preston, to Little Bispham, in the north of Blackpool. The road runs a total distance of approximately 19 miles (31 km), largely following the Fylde coastline, and for 7 miles (11 km) forms Blackpool Promenade.

== Route ==
=== Preston and Lytham ===
It begins in Clifton, west of Preston, as a junction on the A583 Blackpool Road. As Preston New Road, it runs west for 3 miles (5 km), bypassing Freckleton and then becomes Lytham Road through Warton towards Lytham, where it becomes the coast road along Lytham Green. From here it continues west through Fairhaven and St Annes-on-the-Sea following the coast as it turns to the north, as Clifton Drive.

=== Blackpool ===
The road enters Blackpool on the coast at Starr Gate, near Blackpool Airport, about 7 miles (11 km) from Lytham. It continues north up the coast for a further 7 miles (11 km), as Blackpool Promenade (called the Queen's Promenade north of Gynn Square), passing through the town centre as well as many well-known landmarks, including the Pleasure Beach, the Sandcastle Waterpark, Blackpool Tower and the town's three piers. The 5-mile (8 km) stretch between Starr Gate and Bispham is also the site of Blackpool Illuminations during the months of September and October. North of Bispham, the road passes through the suburb of Norbreck and the large Norbreck Castle Hotel before reaching Little Bispham. At this point, it moves inland for roughly half a mile to terminate at the A587 Fleetwood Road, just south of Cleveleys. Between Starr Gate and Little Bispham, the road runs adjacent to the tram tracks.
