= A587 road =

Road in England

A587

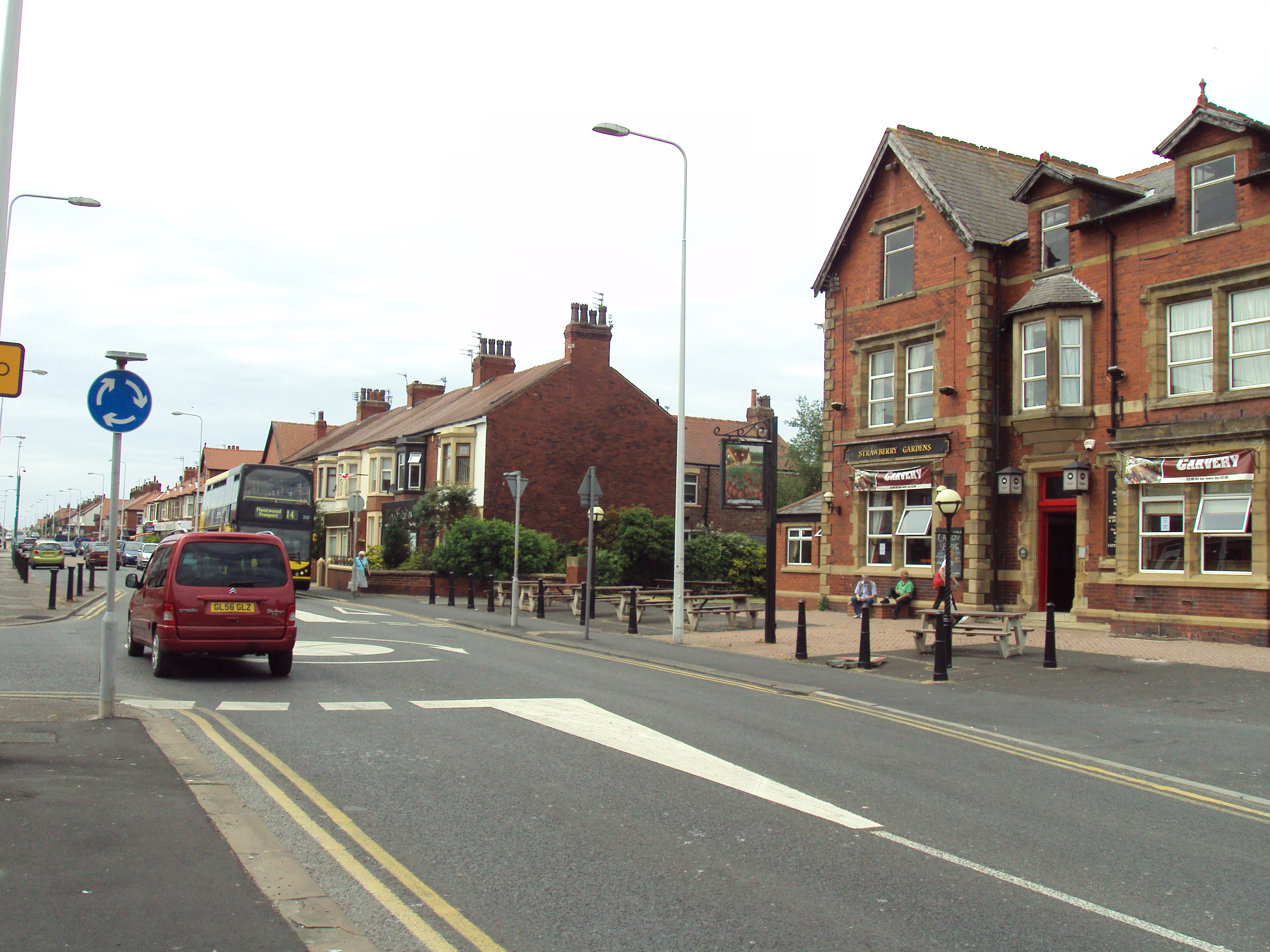
- Poulton Road, Fleetwood

Route information
- Length: 9.5 mi (15.3 km)

Major junctions
- North end: A585 – Fleetwood

- South end: A583 – Blackpool

Location
- Country: United Kingdom
- Constituent country: England

Road network
- Roads in the United Kingdom; Motorways; A and B road zones

The A587 is a road in England that runs from Blackpool to Fleetwood in Lancashire.

The road runs a total distance of approximately 9.5 miles (15.3 km), largely on residential and commercial streets. It begins close to the Oxford Square junction in Marton, in the south-eastern part of Blackpool (53.8043°N 3.0246°W), as a turning off the A583, Preston New Road. It continues north, as South Park Drive and later East Park Drive, past Stanley Park and Blackpool Victoria Hospital for about 1.5 miles (2.4 km), until the Four Lane Ends roundabout. At this point, as St Walburga's Road, it continues north, and later becomes dual carriageway for 0.7 miles (1.1 km) which forms a border between the suburbs of Layton and Grange Park. After the Plymouth Road roundabout, it crosses the railway close to Layton station, and continues north as Bispham Road for a further 1.4 miles (2.3 km), passing through the Warbreck area before reaching Bispham roundabout.

From Bispham it then continues north, as Devonshire Road and later Fleetwood Road, for a further 1.3 miles (2.1 km) through the north Blackpool suburbs of Norbreck and Little Bispham before it is joined at Anchorsholme by the A584 Queen's Promenade. The A587 then heads north for 0.5 miles (0.80 km) as a dual carriageway, named Fleetwood Road and Kelso Avenue for north and southbound traffic respectively, with the tram tracks dividing the road until entering the town of Cleveleys and the Wyre District. Past Victoria Road in Cleveleys, as a single-lane road now known as Rossall Road, it continues north for a further 1.5 miles (2.4 km), past Rossall School in a short 40-mph section, and into Fleetwood, where it becomes Broadway. The road crosses West View roundabout, and turns right down Poulton Road, eventually terminating at the Ash Street roundabout, near Affinity Lancashire (53.9193°N 3.0142°W), where it joins to the A585.
