= A585 road =

Road in England

A585

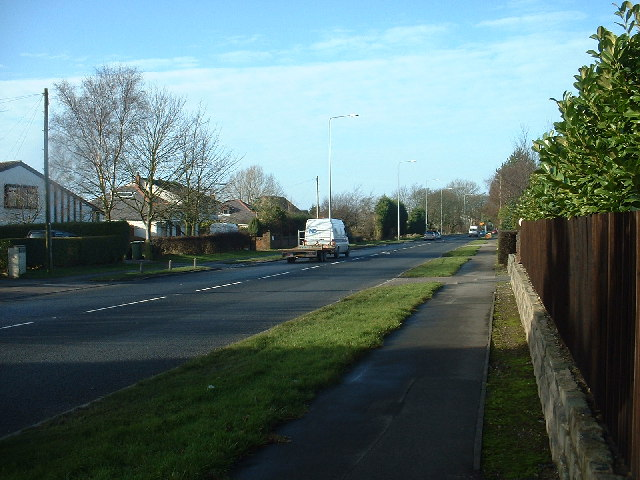
- A585 at Little Singleton

Route information
- Length: 14 mi (23 km)

Location
- Country: United Kingdom

Road network
- Roads in the United Kingdom; Motorways; A and B road zones
← A584	→ A586

The A585 is a primary road in England which runs from Kirkham to Fleetwood in Lancashire.

The road runs a total distance of just under 14 miles (23 km), on a mixture of rural and urban residential/commercial streets. The 12-mile (19 km) section north of the M55 formerly carried large amounts of container traffic to and from the Fleetwood container port, until operations ceased in 2010.

== Route ==
The road begins at Kirkham, as a turning off the A583, the Kirkham by-pass (53.7824°N 2.8941°W). It travels north for 1.5 miles (2.4 km), firstly as the Kirkham & Wesham By-Pass, then as Fleetwood Road, through Kirkham and Wesham, until it meets Junction 3 of the M55 at Wesham Circle. The road continues as Fleetwood Road in a roughly northerly direction for a further 3 miles (4.8 km), through Esprick and Greenhalgh. This section is rural and fairly winding, although some curves were straightened in the 1970s when container traffic began using the road, most notably the series of bends in Thistleton at the B5269 turnings to Singleton and Elswick. These were notoriously known as 'Hellfire Corner'.

The road meets the A586 Garstang New Road near Larbreck, where it turns west, sharing with the A586 for one mile (1.6 km), until a traffic light controlled junction at Little Singleton. It continues north-west as Mains Lane for a further 1.5 miles (2.4 km), passing the A588 turning to Shard Bridge and Over Wyre, then sharing with the A588 until Skippool, where the A588 diverts south-west towards Poulton-le-Fylde via Breck Road. The River Wyre Roundabout at Skippool was removed in 2021 as part of a revamp of Amounderness Way.

At this point, the road becomes Amounderness Way, which was built in the 1970s to allow container traffic to bypass Thornton. It continues through Norcross Roundabout, initially as a national speed limit road until Cleveleys, at which point the speed limit is reduced due to more urban surroundings. The road continues north, acting as a border between Thornton and Cleveleys.

The road then enters Fleetwood, first reaching Broadwater Roundabout, a total distance of about 4.5 miles (7.2 km) from the start of the newer section of the road. Broadwater Roundabout is surmounted by a statue of Eros, a copy of that standing in Piccadilly Circus, London. From here, the road begins its last and newest section, a 1.5-mile (2.4 km) stretch of Amounderness Way built on the old railway bed in the 1990s. It eventually terminates at the Ash Street roundabout, near Fleetwood Freeport, where it joins the A587 (53.9191°N 3.0144°W).

== Little Singleton bypass ==
A new bypass built around Little Singleton fully opened to traffic in early March 2024, having begun a phased opening prior to Christmas 2023. It was built at a length of around 3 miles (4.8 km). The bypass aimed to reduce congestion and bottlenecks on existing roads, particularly during peak traffic hours.
