= Cleveleys =

Town in Lancashire, England

Coordinates: 53.881°N 3.040°W

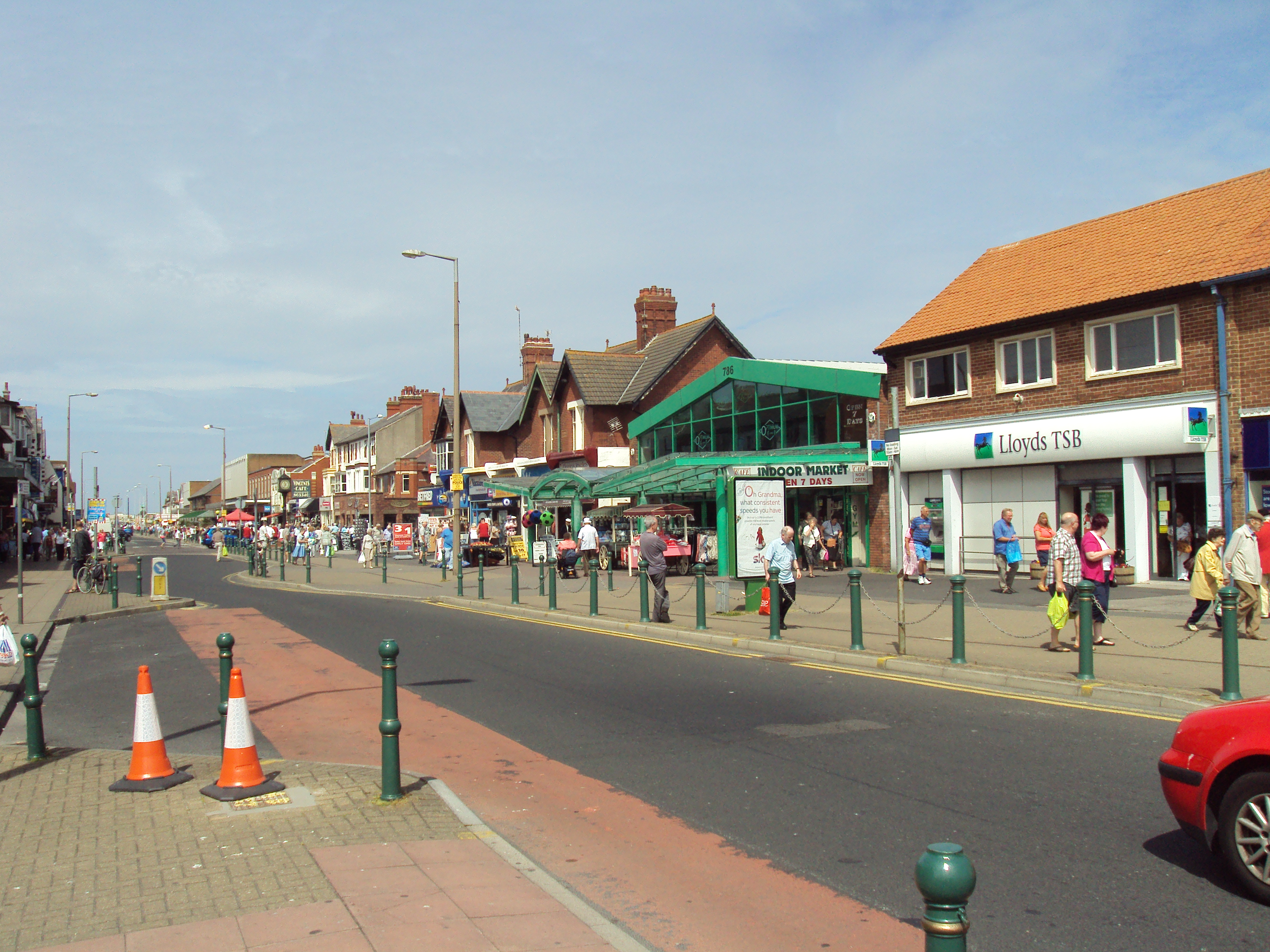
- Victoria Road West

- Shown within Wyre Borough Shown within the Fylde Location within Lancashire
- OS grid reference: SD317433
- District: Wyre
- Shire county: Lancashire
- Region: North West
- Country: England
- Sovereign state: United Kingdom
- Post town: THORNTON-CLEVELEYS
- Postcode district: FY5
- Dialling code: 01253
- Police: Lancashire
- Fire: Lancashire
- Ambulance: North West
- UK Parliament: Blackpool North and Fleetwood

Cleveleys is a town on the coast of the Fylde peninsula of Lancashire, England, about 4 miles (6 km) north of Blackpool and 2 miles (3 km) south of Fleetwood. It is part of the Borough of Wyre. With its neighbouring settlement of Thornton, Cleveleys was part of the former urban district of Thornton-Cleveleys and is part of the Blackpool Urban Area. In 2011 the Cleveleys Built-up area sub division had a population of 10,754.

== History ==
At the start of the Second World War, several departments of the Ministry of Pensions, the Ministry of Education and the Board of Trade were moved to the Cleveleys area. Some were housed in the Rossall School briefly. An extensive site was developed for the Ministry of Pensions in the Norcross section of Carleton and all the government departments moved out in 1940.

On 1 February 2008, the MS Riverdance ferry, while undertaking a regular sailing from Northern Ireland to Heysham under severe stormy conditions, ran aground on Anchorsholme beach, close to the boundary with Cleveleys

== Transport ==
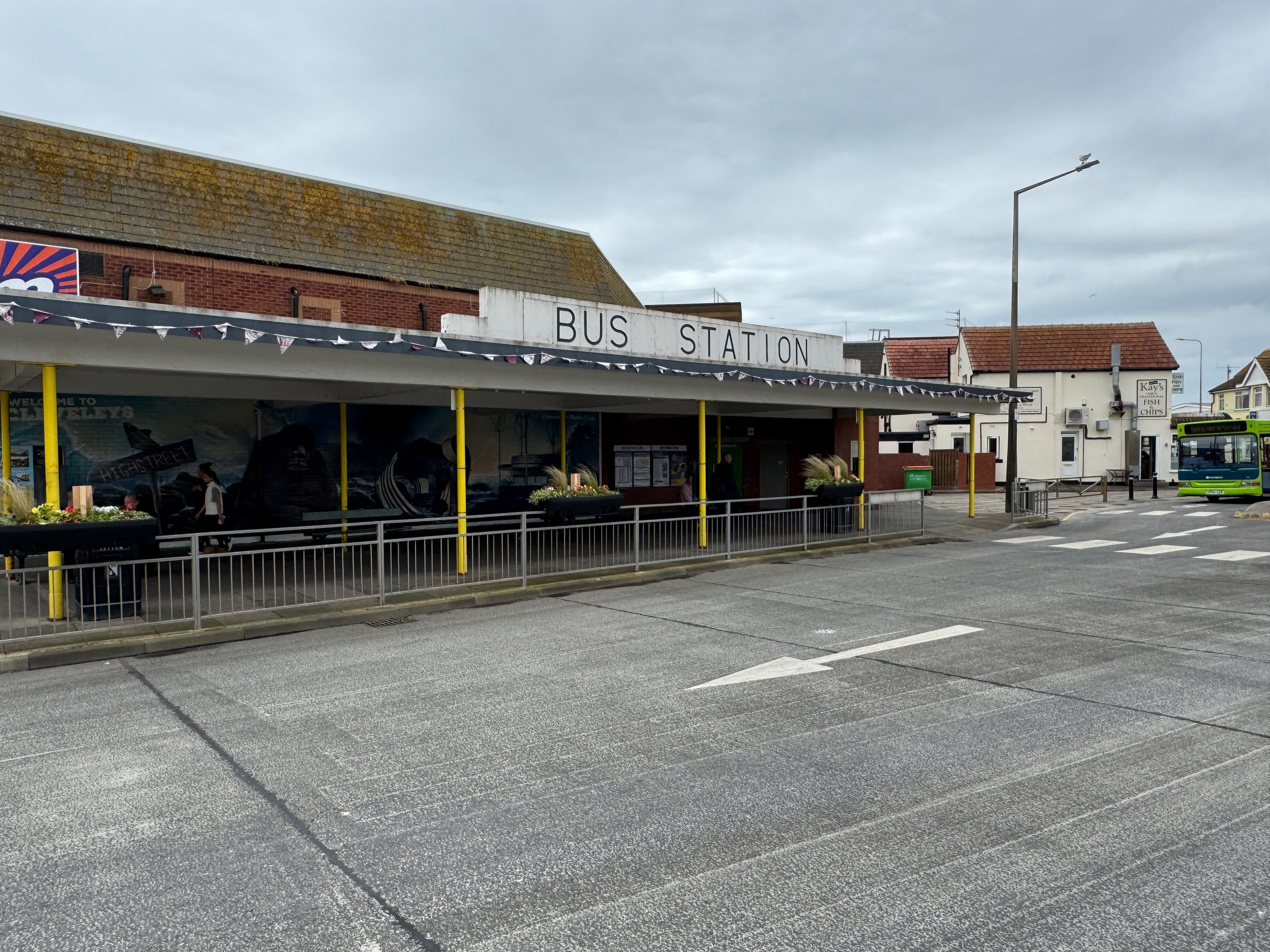
Cleveleys bus station in 2024

Cleveleys is served by Blackpool Transport, which operates to Blackpool town centre, Mereside, Lytham, Bispham and Fleetwood via Cleveleys bus station. Transpora's route 24 also serves Cleveleys.

Cleveleys is on the Blackpool Tramway. The tramway runs from Starr Gate in Blackpool to Fleetwood via Bispham and Cleveleys. There are five tram stops in the area, between the stops of Rossall School (Southern Fleetwood) and Little Bispham (Northern edge of Blackpool).

The nearest railway station to Cleveleys is Poulton-le-Fylde, 3.5 miles (5.6 km) away. Poulton-le-Fylde has train services to Blackpool North or to Manchester Airport, York or Liverpool.

== Media ==
Local television news programmes are provided by BBC North West and ITV Granada. The local television station That's Lancashire also broadcasts to the area. Television signals are received from the Winter Hill TV transmitter.

Local radio stations are BBC Radio Lancashire, Heart North West, Smooth North West, Greatest Hits Radio Lancashire, Dune Radio, and Blackpool-based stations: Coastal Radio and Fylde Coast Radio.

The town is served by the local newspaper, Blackpool Gazette.

== Amenities ==
Cleveleys has a number of pubs, including The Victoria Hotel, The Shipwreck Brewhouse, and The Jolly Tars, all on Victoria Road.

Between 1961 and 2004, the Children's Corner amusement park stood on Cleveleys Promenade at the end of Victoria Road West. It was demolished in the early 21st century as part of work on the town's sea defences.

== In popular culture ==
In early May 2021, the Star Wars series Andor shot on location in Cleveleys. The town doubled as the beach resort planet Niamos where Cassian Andor was arrested.
