= Thornton-Cleveleys =

Coordinates: 53.874°N 3.021°W

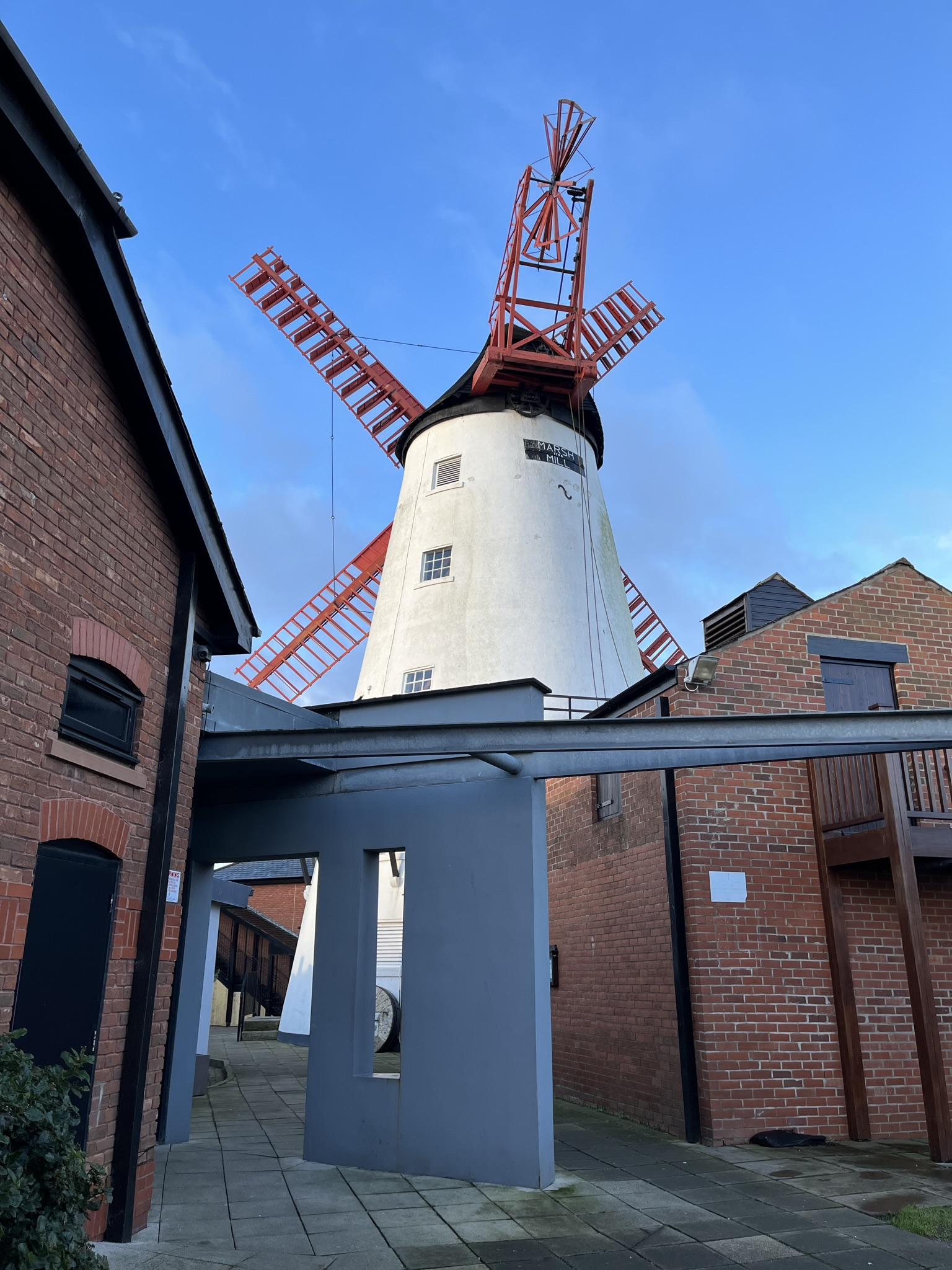
- Marsh Mill, Thornton

- Shown within Wyre Borough Shown on the Fylde Location within Lancashire
- Population: 31,157 (2001 Census)
- District: Wyre
- Shire county: Lancashire
- Region: North West
- Country: England
- Sovereign state: United Kingdom
- Post town: Thornton-Cleveleys
- Postcode district: FY5
- Dialling code: 01253
- Police: Lancashire
- Fire: Lancashire
- Ambulance: North West
- UK Parliament: Blackpool North Fleetwood

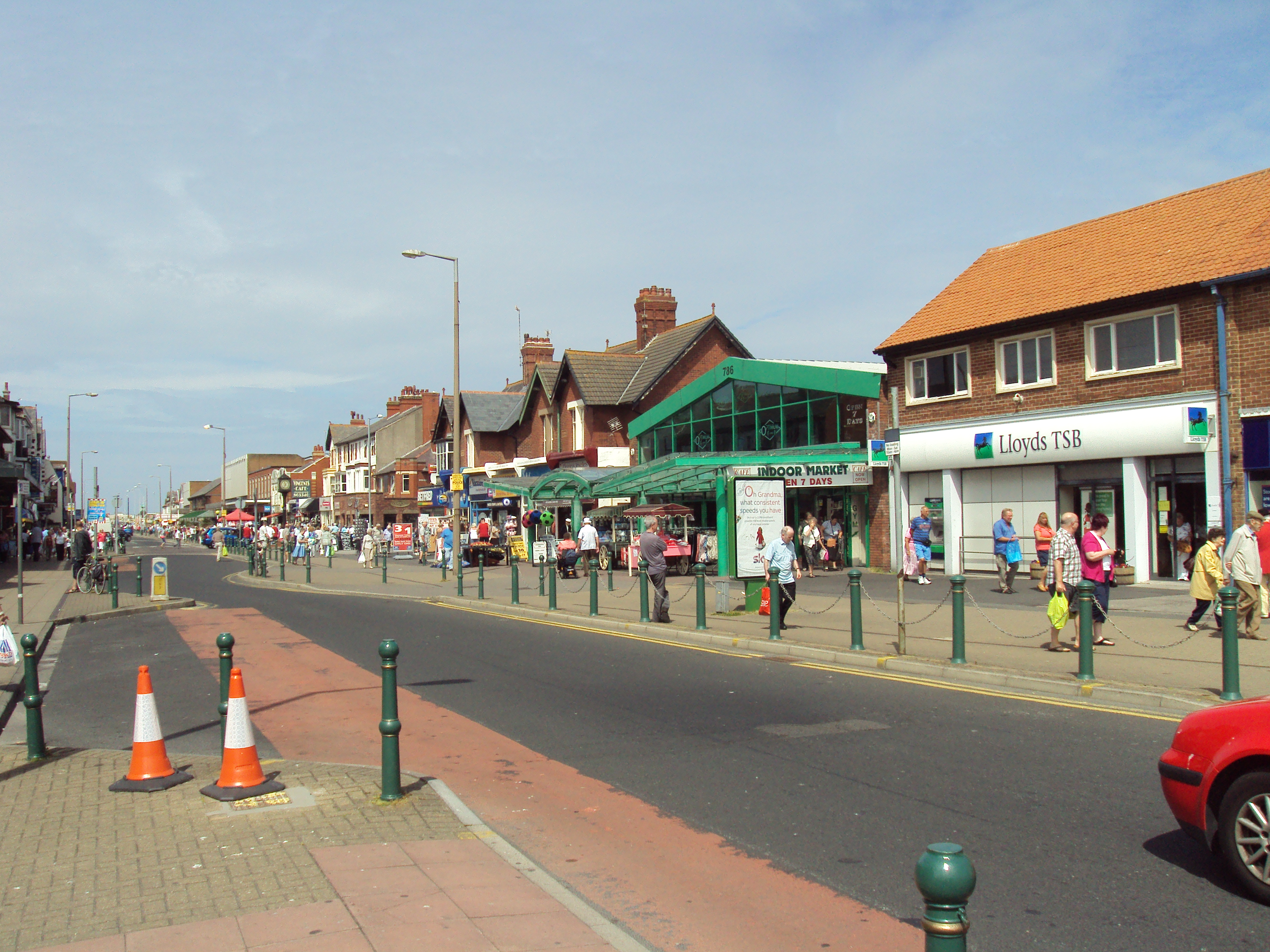
Victoria Road West, Cleveleys

Thornton-Cleveleys is a conurbation consisting of the village of Thornton and the town of Cleveleys. The two settlements formed a joint urban district from 1927 until 1974, before becoming part of Wyre, Lancashire.

== Political geography ==
The civil parish of Thornton became an urban district in 1900, and was then renamed Thornton-Cleveleys in 1927, the parish remained just "Thornton". On 1 April 1974 the urban district became part of the Borough of Wyre. No successor parish was formed so it became unparished. Thornton-Cleveleys corresponds with five wards of the borough.

According to the 2001 census Thornton-Cleveleys has a population of 25,547, increasing to 28,703 at the 2011 census. The population of the individual borough council wards was recorded as:

- Bourne: 6,121 (2011 = 6,676)
- Cleveleys Park: 5,994 (2011 = 5,940)
- Jubilee: 4,186 (2011 = 4,025)
- Stanah: 5,267 (2011 = 6,111)
- Victoria: 5,851 (2011 = 5,951)

== See also ==
- Listed buildings in Thornton-Cleveleys
