= The Rivers Trust =

Waterway society in the UK and Ireland

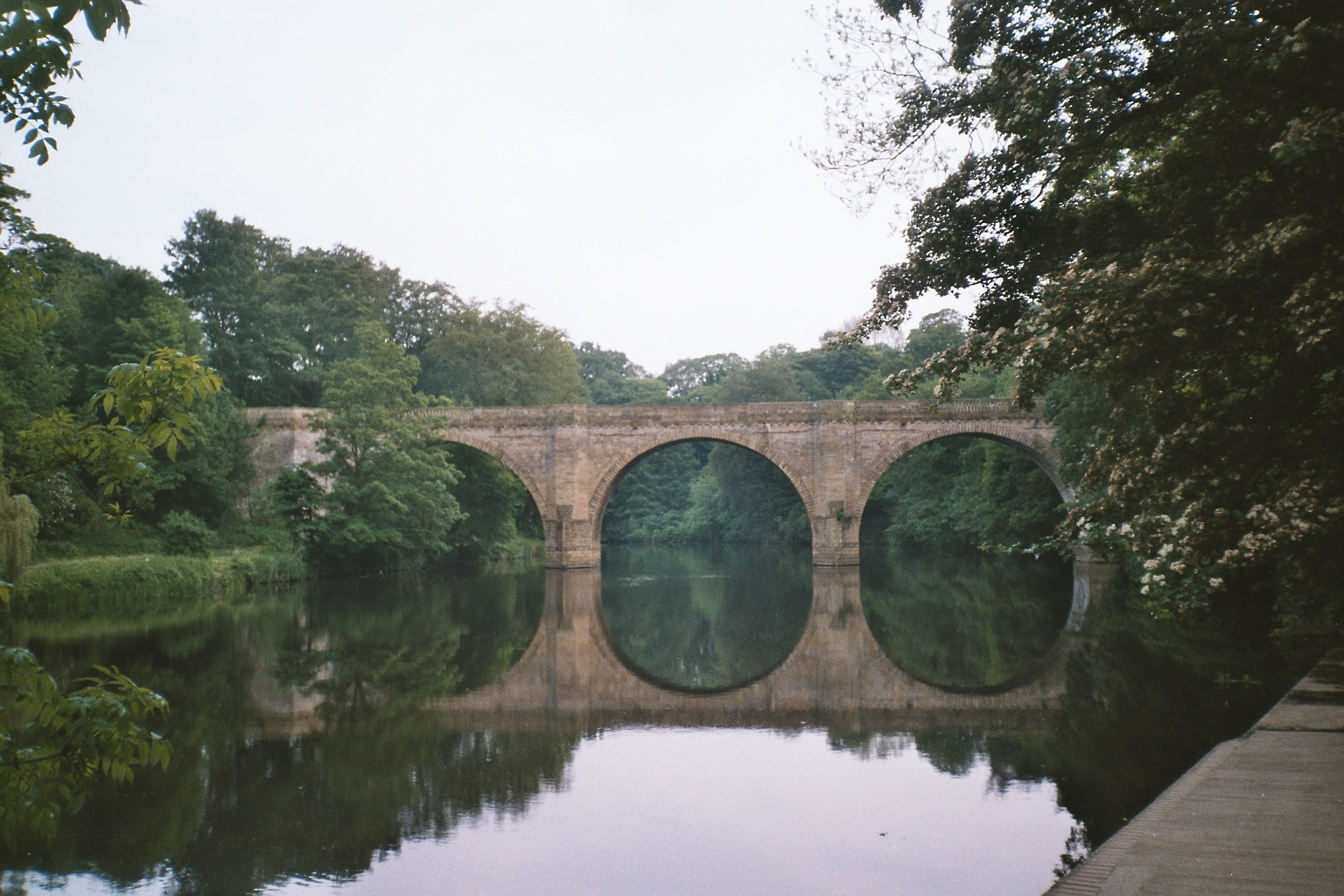
Prebends Bridge, River Wear, Durham

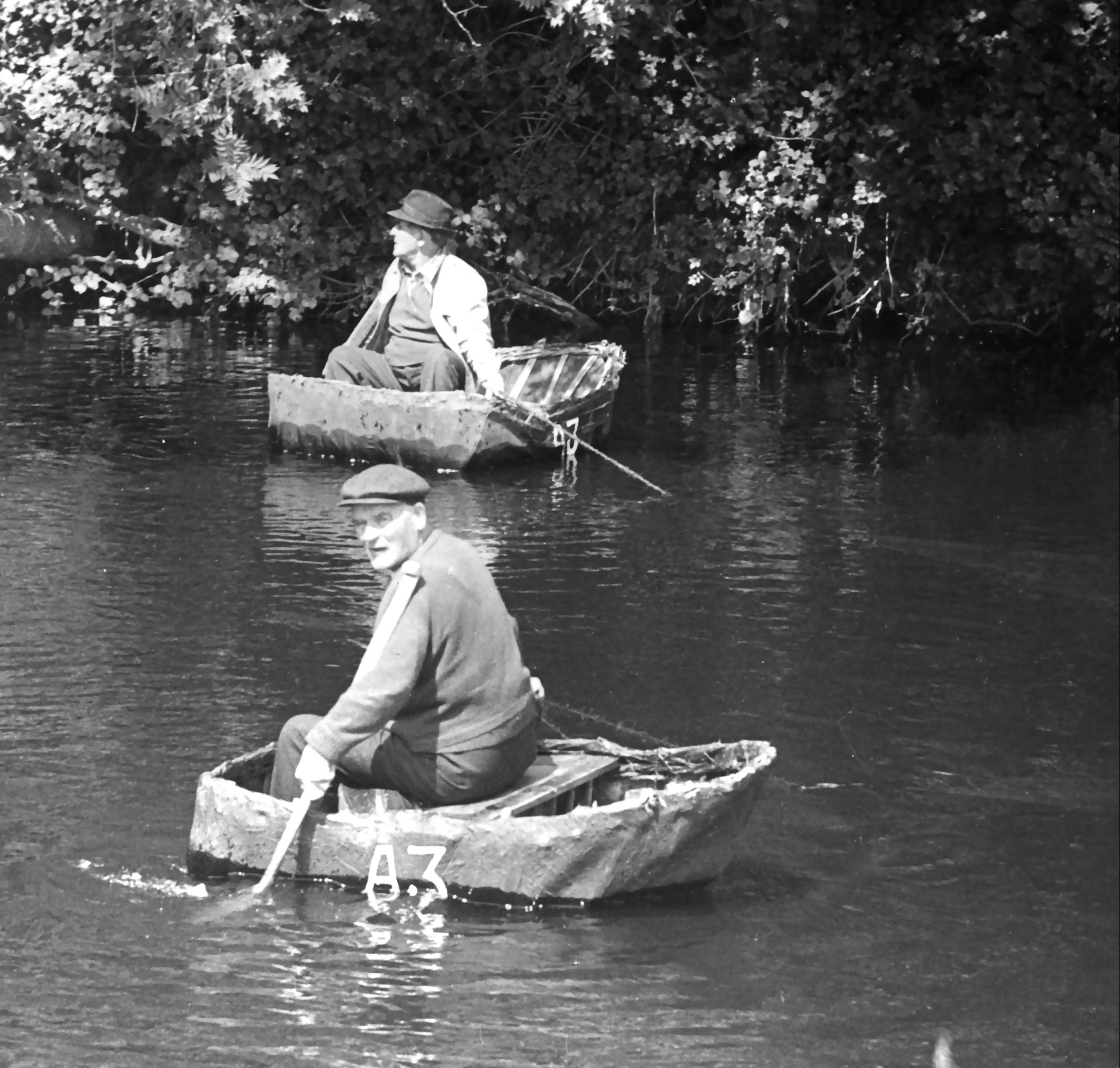
Coracles on the River Teifi

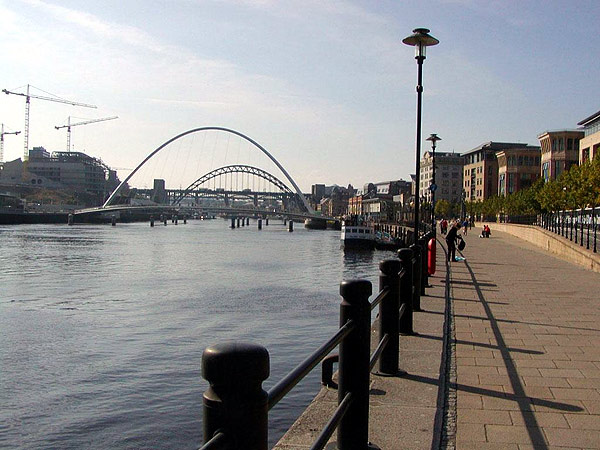
River Tyne

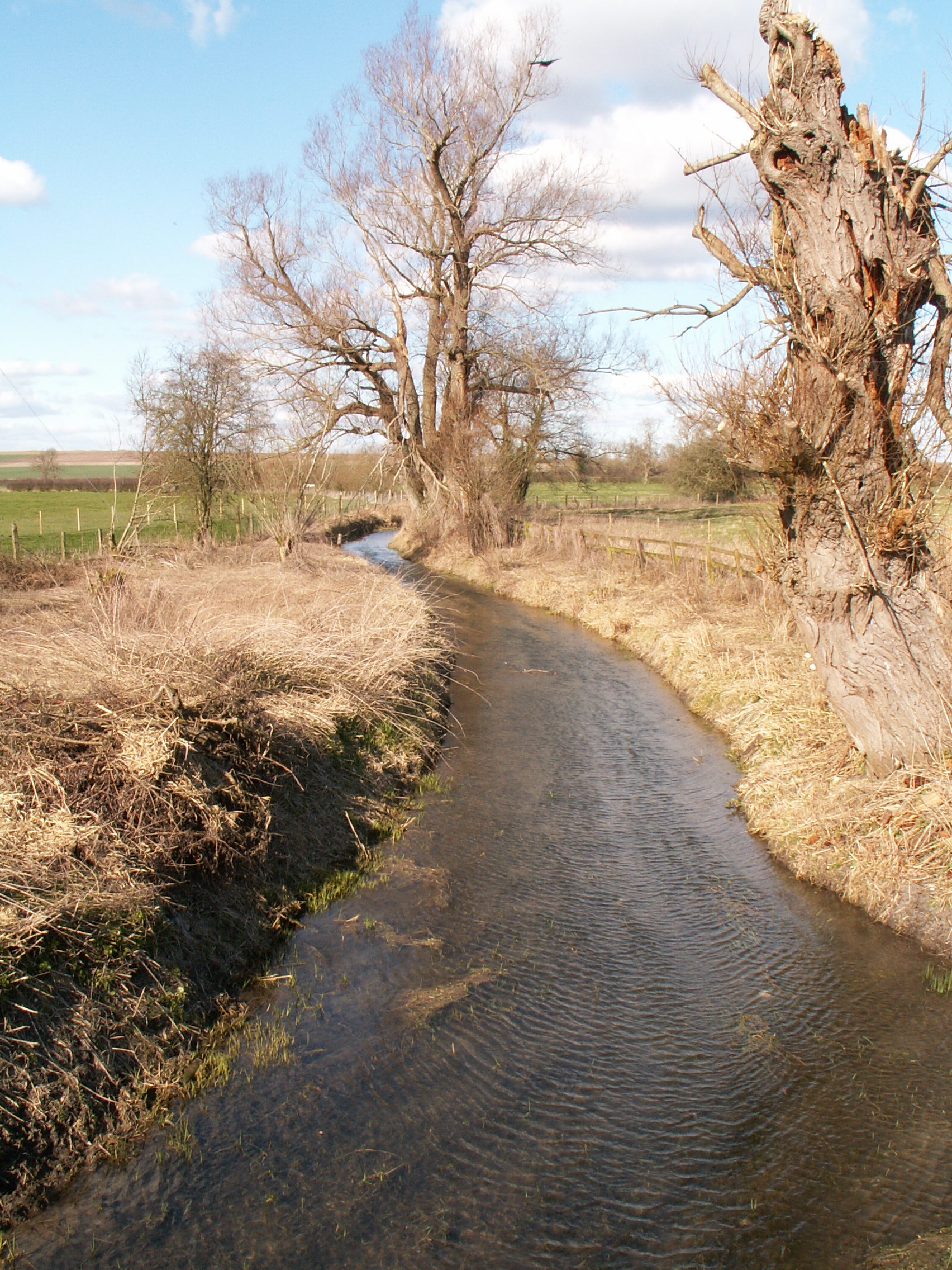
River Kennet

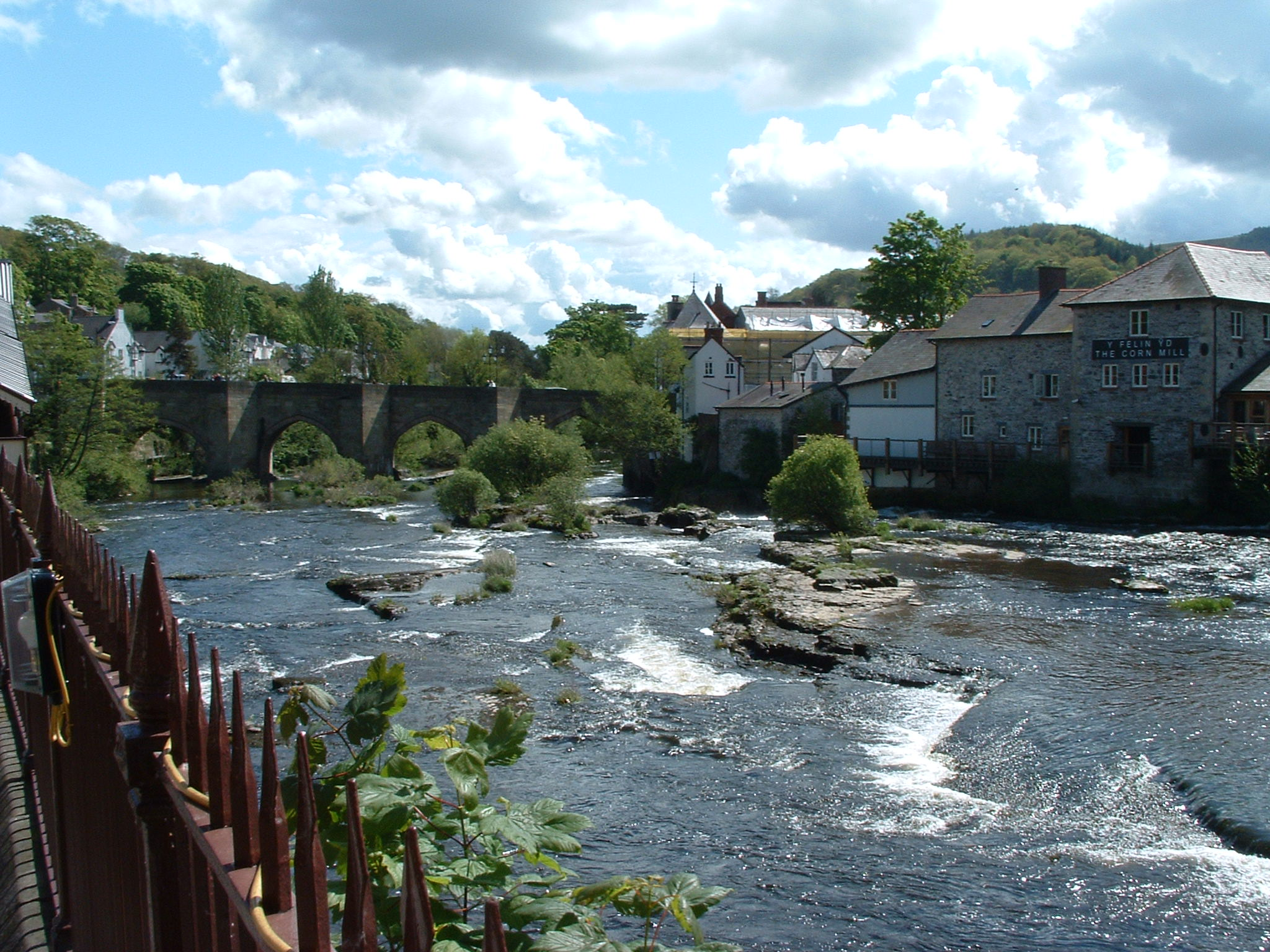
River Dee, Wales

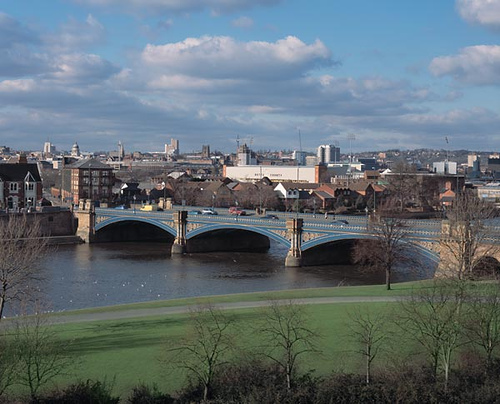
River Trent, Nottingham

The Rivers Trust (RT) is an environmental charity No. 1107144, and an umbrella organisation for 60 member trusts concerned with rivers in England, Wales, Northern Ireland and Ireland. The Trust's headquarters are in Callington, Cornwall. The Rivers Trust along with its members work to protect, promote and enhance freshwater ecosystems for both people and wildlife.

The Rivers Trust was founded in 2001 as the Association of Rivers Trusts. Its founding associations were four River Trusts: the Eden Rivers Trust, Tweed Foundation, Westcountry Rivers Trust, and the Wye and Usk Foundation. The association was granted registered charity status in 2004. Its Scottish equivalent is the Rivers and Fisheries Trusts of Scotland (RAFTS). Its Welsh equivalent is Afonydd Cymru: The Rivers Trust of Wales. (AC)

The association changed its name in August 2011 to The Rivers Trust.

The Rivers Trust are members of Blueprint for Water , Wildlife and Countryside Link and are administrators of the Catchment Based Approach .

== Member organisations ==
- Action for the River Kennet
- Aire Rivers Trust
- Arun and Rother Rivers Trust
- Ballinderry Rivers Trust
- Blackwater Rivers Trust
- Bristol Avon Rivers Trust
- Calder Rivers Trust
- Cambridgeshire Rivers Trust
- Clwyd, Conwy and Gwynedd Rivers Trust
- Cotswold Rivers Trust
- Don Catchment Rivers Trust
- East Yorkshire Rivers Trust
- Eden Rivers Trust
- Erne Rivers Trust
- Essex and Suffolk Rivers Trust
- Galloway Fisheries Trust
- Galway Waterways Foundation
- Inishowen Rivers Trust
- Lagan Rivers Trust
- Lincolnshire Rivers Trust
- Lune Rivers Trust
- Maigue Rivers Trust
- Main Rivers Trust
- Mersey Rivers Trust
- Moy Catchment River Association
- Norfolk Rivers Trust
- Northumberland Rivers Trust
- Nore Rivers Trust
- Ouse and Adur Rivers Trust
- Ribble Rivers Trust
- River Nene Regional Park CiC
- River Waveney Trust
- Severn Rivers Trust
- Six Mile Rivers Trust
- Slaney River Trust
- South Cumbria Rivers Trust
- South East Rivers Trust
- South East Wales Rivers Trust
- Strule Tributaries Rivers Trust
- Tees Rivers Trust
- Thames Rivers Trust
- Thames 21
- Trent Rivers Trust
- Tweed Forum Limited
- Tyne Rivers Trust
- Waterville Lakes and Rivers Trust
- Wear Rivers Trust
- Welland Rivers Trust
- Welsh Dee Rivers Trust
- Wessex Chalk Stream and Rivers Trust
- West Cumbria Rivers Trust
- West Wales Rivers Trust
- Westcountry Rivers Trust
- Wye and Usk Foundation
- Wyre Rivers Trust
- Yorkshire Dales Rivers Trust
- Yorkshire Esk Rivers Trust

== See also ==
- List of waterway societies in the United Kingdom
- List of navigation authorities in the United Kingdom
- Rivers and Fisheries Trusts of Scotland
- Sewage discharge in the United Kingdom
