= Westcountry Rivers Trust =

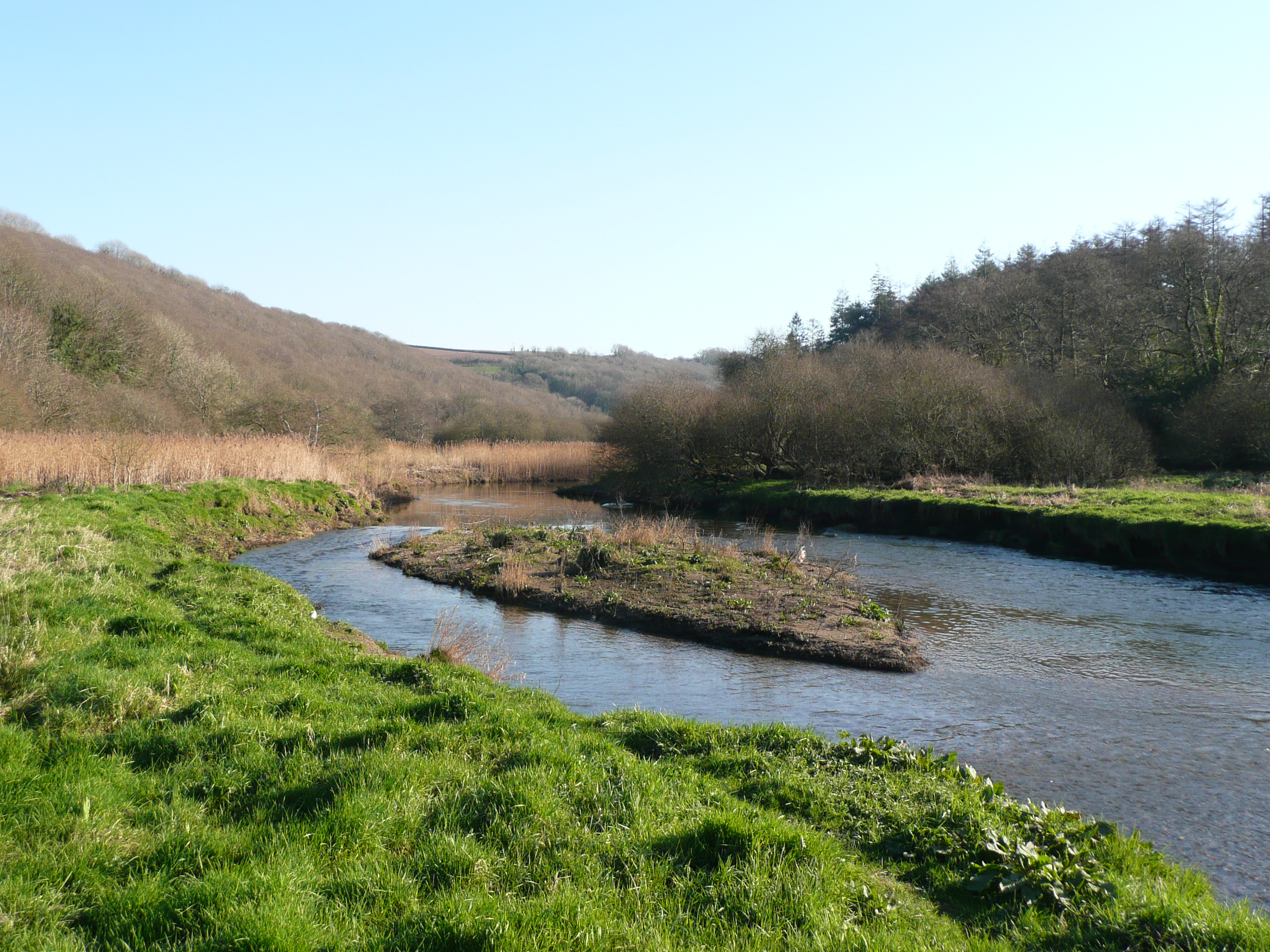
An eyot in the River Camel between Polbrock and Pendavey looking upstream.

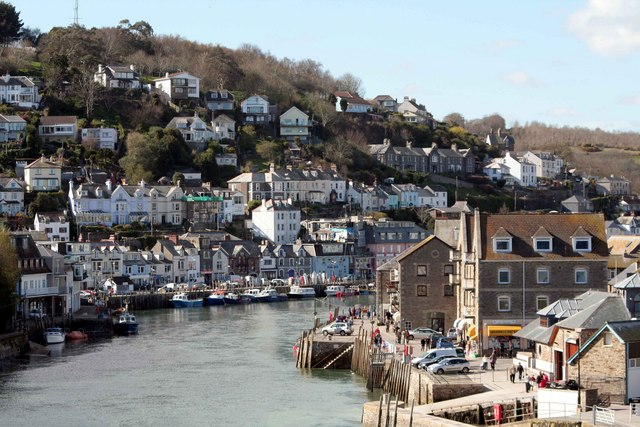
River Looe

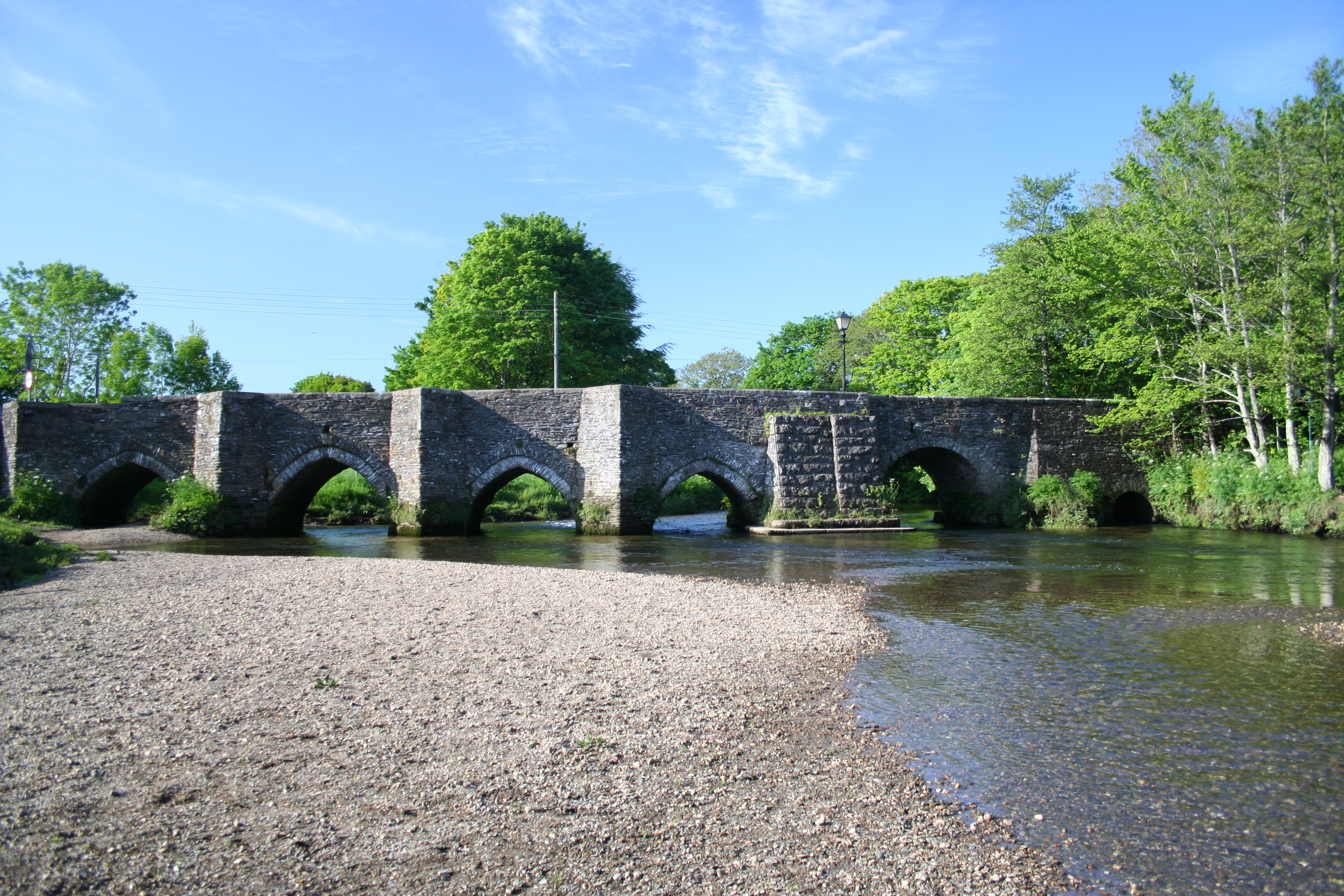
River Fowey

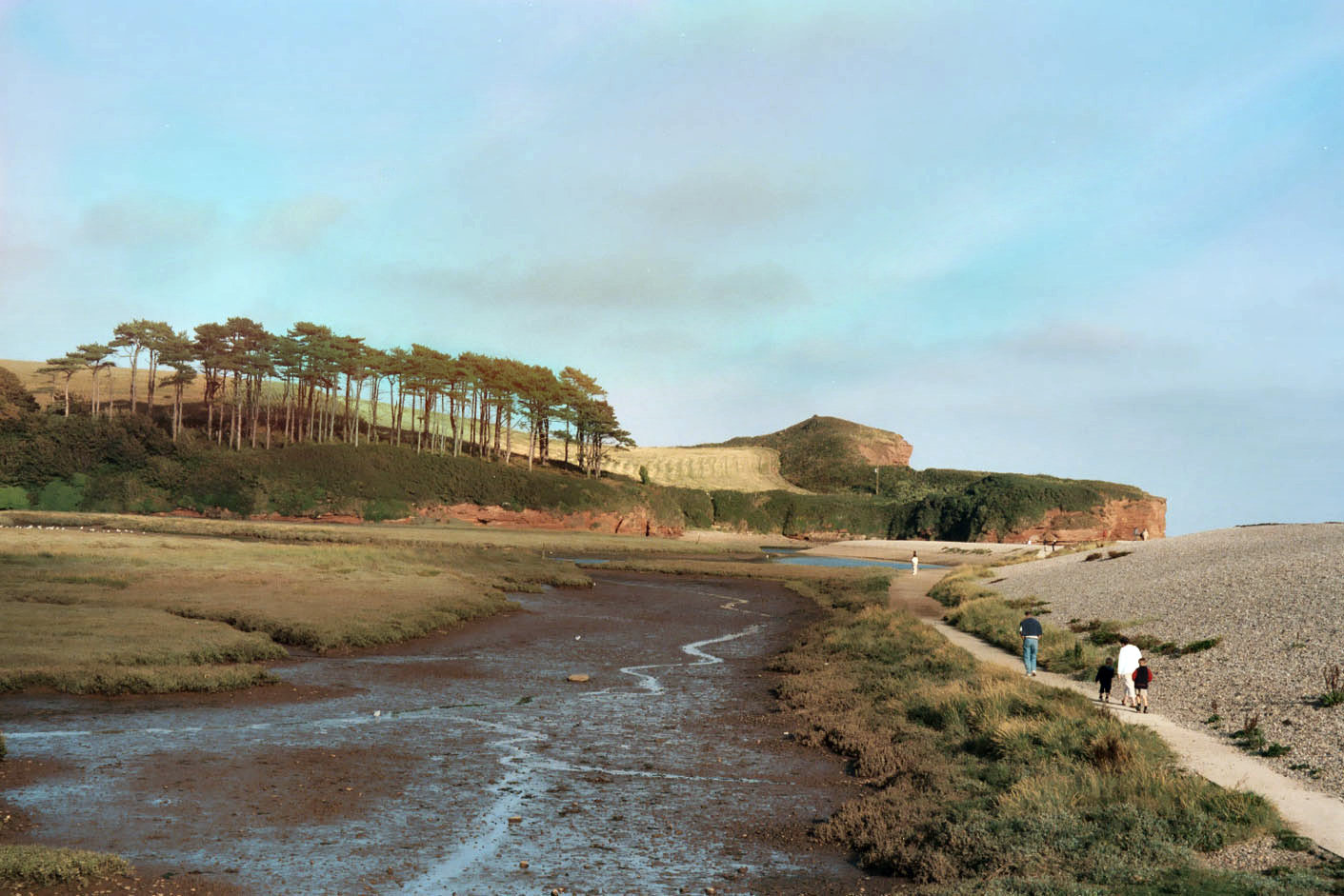
River Otter, Devon

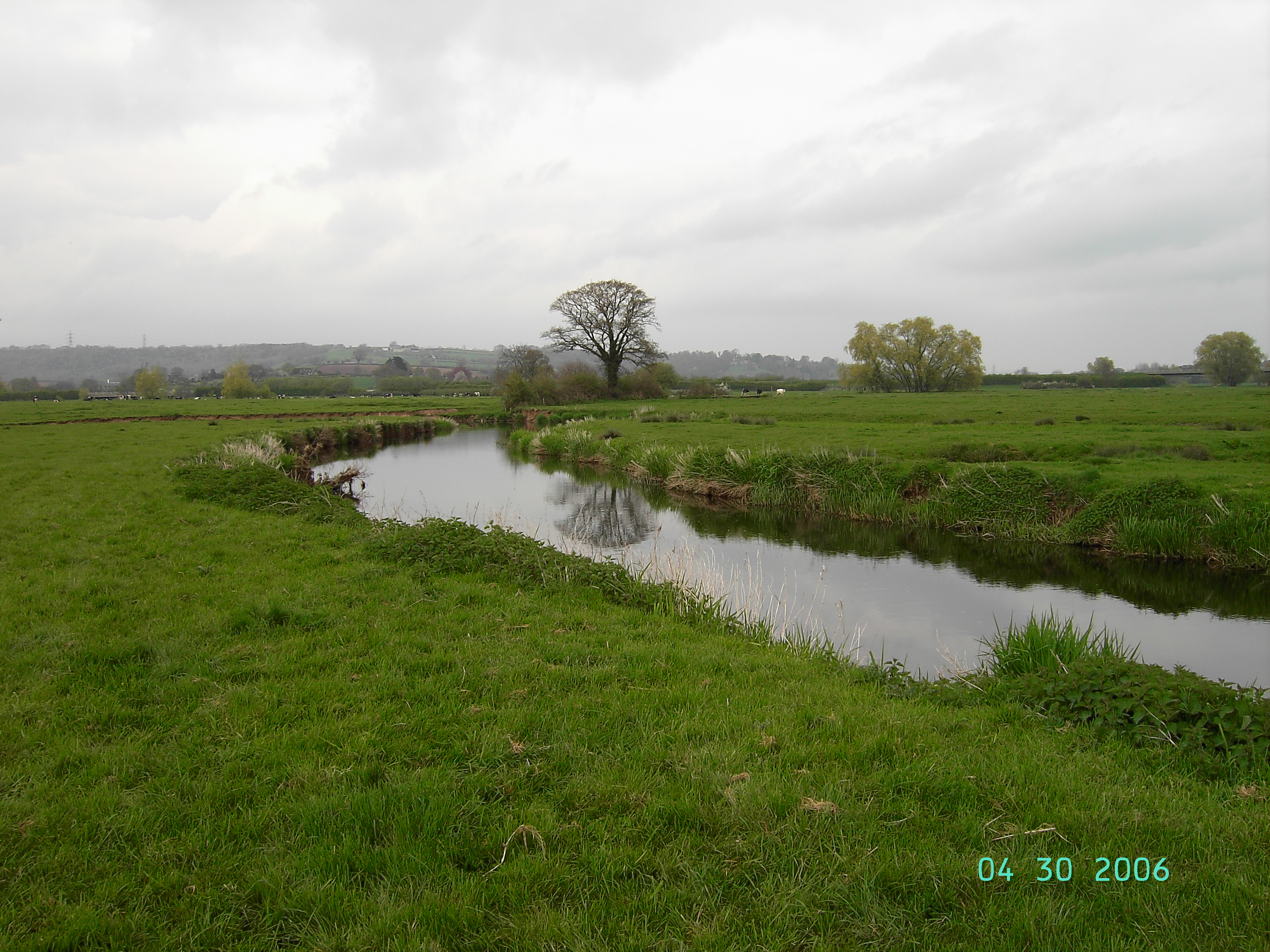
River Axe

The Westcountry Rivers Trust is a waterway society and a registered charity No. 1135007 in the West Country of England, United Kingdom. The Trust was founded in 1995 and aims to protect and enhance the West Country's rivers and streams, and to work with the region's landowners, farmers and the wider community, mainly through education projects.

== History of the Trust ==
The Westcountry Rivers Trust was launched in 1994 by a group of individuals who shared a love of rivers and concerns for the health of freshwater environments in the region. These individuals were particularly motivated to act, having observed a decline in water quality and fish populations in the rivers Taw and Torridge, largely resulting from drought and eutrophication. Additionally, they had been inspired by the success of communities joining together elsewhere to improve their environment. This group went on to become the first board of trustees when the Westcountry Rivers Trust gained its charitable status in 1995 and included a number of notable figures: Poet Laureate Ted Hughes, Stuart Gardiner, Lord Clinton, Teddy Goldsmith, Nick Grant, Alan Hawken, Michael Heathcoat-Amory, Michael Martin, Bill Tucker and Ann Voss-Bark. After a long period of volunteering, the first employee of the Trust was Arlin Rickard, who set up headquarters in his home. Arlin Rickard has since become CEO of The Rivers Trust.

The approach to river restoration taken by the Westcountry Rivers was particularly innovative at the time since it encouraged people to see how efforts to restore rivers have multiple additional benefits to farmers, water companies, tourism, estuary dredging and human health. Consequently, the changes to practice encouraged by the Trust outlasted the length of the projects.

The Westcountry Rivers Trust offered a refreshing stance to the restoration of our rivers; while so many efforts to conserve the environment are limited to the length of the project, it realised that it could open people's eyes to the wider benefits of river restoration. Measures to protect rivers could also help to save money for farmers, lower costs for water companies, boost tourism, reduce the need to dredge our estuaries and even benefit human health. Further to this, the Trust ensured that their work took into account the best available science and adopted an ‘ecosystems approach,’ which considers the functioning of the entire river catchment, rather than focusing solely on the river channel.

Despite its beginning as a small, grassroots charity, the potential of the Westcountry Rivers Trust's approach to make positive change to the river environment was recognised in 1996 when it was awarded the £1.6 million Tamar 2000 project. In 2017, the Trust employs a team of 36 and its approach to river restoration has been rolled out nationwide; following the establishment of The Rivers Trust in 2001, there are now in excess of 54 rivers trusts across the UK, making the rivers trust movement one of the most rapidly growing environmental movements.

== Projects ==
=== Upstream Thinking 2 (2015–2020) ===
Alongside partners from Devon Wildlife Trust, Cornwall Wildlife Trust & Exmoor National Park Authority, the Westcountry Rivers Trust is currently delivering the second phase of the South West Water-funded Upstream Thinking project.

The main aim of the Upstream Thinking project is to improve the quality of water in our rivers, which are the primary source of drinking water in the South West, and so reduce the need for costly and resource-intensive treatment processes at the Water treatment works. Often water quality issues in the region are caused by thousands of small incidents throughout the catchment. While these individual incidents tend not to be severe enough to breach water standards, they can have a large cumulative effect on the river. The approach taken by the Westcountry Rivers Trust is to work with landowners to reduce or mitigate the pressures on the river system across 5 important river catchments in the Westcountry: the Fowey, Tamar, Exe, Dart and Otter. In addition to the benefits to South West Water and their customers, the Upstream Thinking projects brings benefits in terms of the general health of the rivers, their ecology, wider biodiversity and agricultural productivity.

=== Upstream Thinking 2010–2015 ===
The Trust delivered South West Water's funded Upstream Thinking project, which is a collaborative conservation project on a catchment scale working to deliver a sustainable approach to land and water resource management. The project targeted strategic catchments in the Westcountry, which supply reservoirs and abstraction points, in a move to significantly improve raw water quality. By doing so, it reduced the cost of treatment plant and continual upgrading which has become necessary due to the increased sediment and/or nutrient loading in watercourses. The Upstream Thinking initiative is collectively worth over £9m and was the first project of its kind in the UK. The project value to WRT was £3.2m in the PR09 period, which entails farm advice and tailored farm plans to identify and tackle diffuse pollution from agriculture across five catchments.

=== Upstream Thinking Reverse Auction ===
As part of Upstream Thinking the Trust ran a reverse auction run on the river Fowey in conjunction with the University or East Anglia (funded by the DEFRA Economics Team). The auction distributed £360k against competitive bids submitted by farmers for capital works and management actions enshrined in a contract and 25-year covenant. Bids were evaluated in terms of environmental value for money using an advisor devised scoring matrix to score different interventions and then weight them against the intensity of farming operations and geographical location and the inherent risk of their land.

=== Catchment Restoration Fund – River Improvement Projects ===
The Trust delivered 5 CRF projects on the South Hams rivers, Dart & Teign, Exe & Axe, South Cornwall Rivers and on the Taw. The Taw River Improvement Project (TRIP – £1.8m) delivered Good Ecological Status for the Water Framework Directive on the river Taw. The predominant failures of these projects are addressing lack of fish and high phosphate levels. The projects included: – data assessment and surveying group that is apportioning sediment and phosphate using modelling programmes (SAGIS, SCIMAP, PSYCHIC, ECM, etc.) and novel tracing work; – fisheries work running walk over surveys and improving fish habitat and access; – agricultural work, linking with farmers to reduce sedimentation and phosphate loss; and – biodiversity work, delivering with landowners to use habitat to address WFD failures.

=== Catchment Based Approach ===
The Westcountry Rivers Trust has played host to several Catchment partnership but the longest is the Tamar Catchment Area Partnership, which consists of over 100 stakeholders representing over 30 organisations and groups. The initial pilot sought to address a failure in communication between the wants and needs of the stakeholders across a broad suite of ecosystem services, which historically has resulted in a multitude of sectorally focused management plans that at best do not articulate with, and at worse conflict against, each other. The Stakeholders formed six working groups that looked at water quality (both diffuse and point source), water quantity (both flooding and drought), carbon sequestration, habitats for wildlife and recreation/culture. Each group created a map(s) of the areas important in the provision of the service they were interested derived from a mutually agreed set of rules and assumptions. These maps where then combined to create a map of multifunctional areas that are important in the provision of several services. This allowed the wider partnership to understand the value of the catchment and where there were areas where complementary actions could lead to cost-benefit improvements.

=== Cornwall Rivers Project ===
This £2.6 million Project, from 2002 to 2006, was funded by the European Union (European Agriculture Guidance and Guarantee Fund) Objective 1 Programme and by the UK Government's Department of Environment, Food and Rural Affairs. It was aimed at those managing land in the catchments of these rivers and streams:

- River Allen, River Caerhays, River Camel, River Looe (East Looe River), (West Looe River), River Fal, River Fowey, River Gannel, Lerryn River, River Inny, River Lynher, River Menalhyl, River Mevagissey, River Neet, River Otter, River Seaton, River Strat, River Tiddy, River Tresilian, River White. Trust members visited over 870 landholdings in Cornwall to help improve farming practice, to protect the environment and to make economic savings. More than 1,380 km of watercourses were surveyed, and Integrated River Basin Resource Management Plans issued.

An End of Project leaflet was produced:

- Cornwall Rivers Project leaflet (PDF)

== See also ==
- List of rivers of England
- List of waterway societies in the United Kingdom
