= Bambuco Bridge =

Former sculpture in Newcastle upon Tyne, England

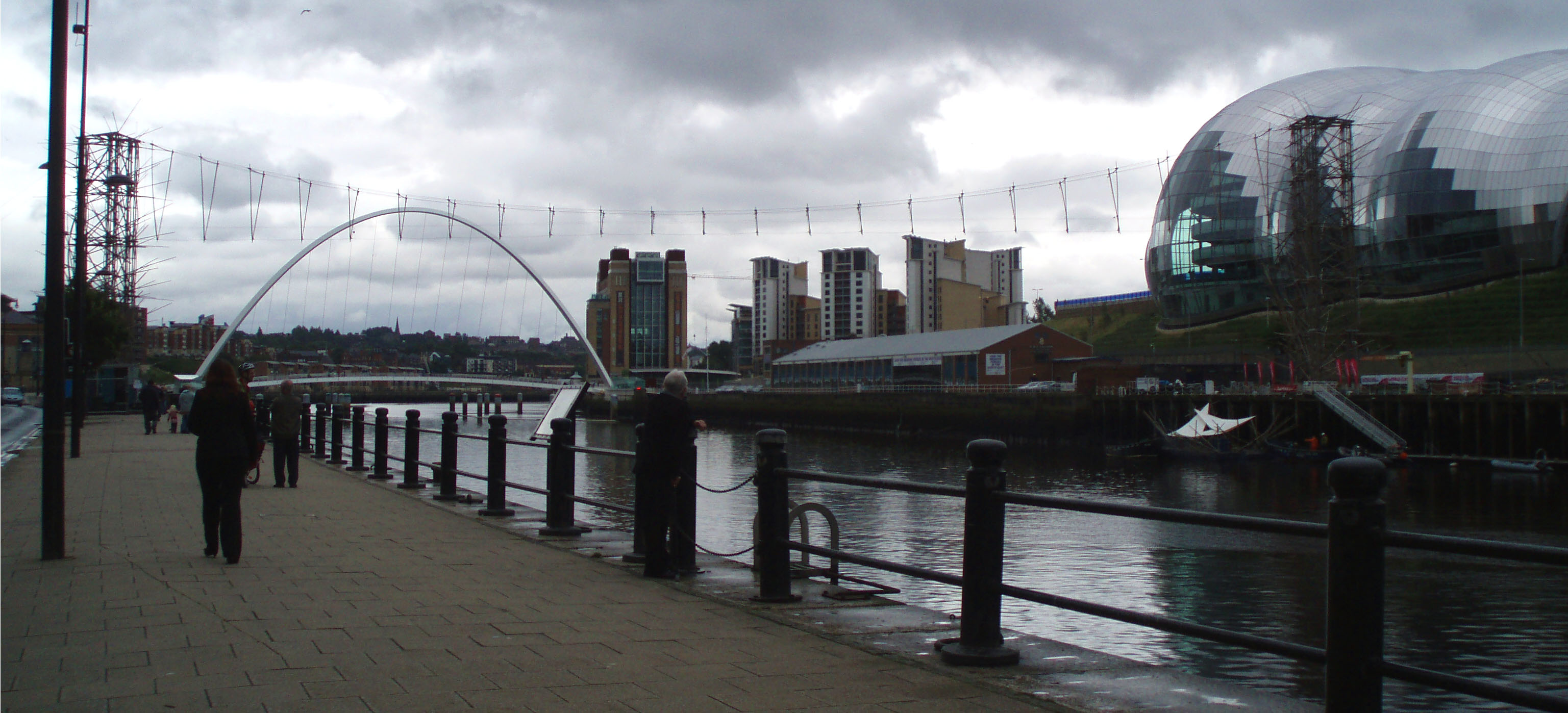
- Artist: Bambuco
- Year: 18 July 2008–20 July 2008
- Medium: Bamboo and rope
- Subject: Simple suspension bridge
- Dimensions: 25 m × 120 m (82 ft × 390 ft)
- Condition: Dismantled
- Location: Newcastle upon Tyne and Gateshead
- Coordinates: 54.9692°N 1.6039°W

The Bambuco Bridge was a temporary outdoor sculpture in the form of a simple suspension bridge spanning the River Tyne, England, made entirely from bamboo wood. The public art was designed and built for the SummerTyne festival, part of the NewcastleGateshead initiative.

== History ==
The 'bridge' was actually a sculpture and could not be used for human or vehicular transport. The sculpture opened for its three-day run at 10:00 on 18 July 2008, and closed on 20 July; the opening coincided with the start of the ten-day SummerTyne festival. There was a light show at 21:00 on 18 July to officially mark the occasion. After the three-day period, the bridge was dismantled in late July.

Newcastle upon Tyne and Gateshead commissioned the Australia-based firm Bambuco to create the bridge sculpture from 20 tonnes (in 800 pieces) of bamboo in 2008, the 80th anniversary of the construction of the Tyne Bridge. The sculpture's construction started in late June 2008. It was located between the Tyne Bridge and the Gateshead Millennium Bridge and spanned 120 m (390 ft) across the river, at a height of 25 m (82 ft). The sculpture—which had its legs next to HMS Calliope on the Gateshead bank and the law courts on the Newcastle bank—was also at a slight angle across the river. The founder of Bambuco, Simon Barley had the initial idea of a bamboo bridge over the Tyne, but died in 2007 before the project could be undertaken; Bambuco toyed with calling this bridge the Bridge of Si's, a play on Venice's Bridge of Sighs.

== Image gallery ==
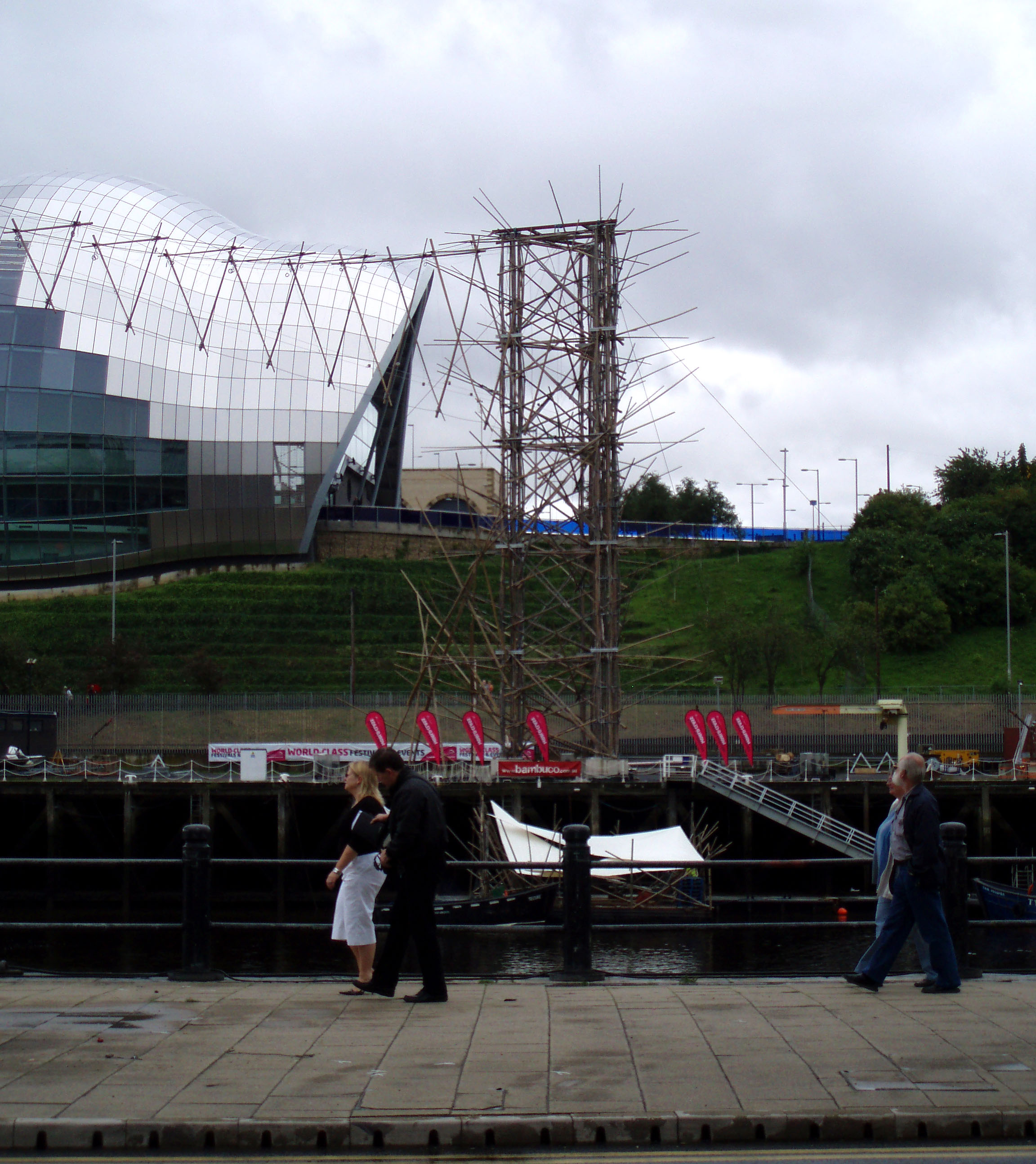
The Gateshead tower of the sculpture

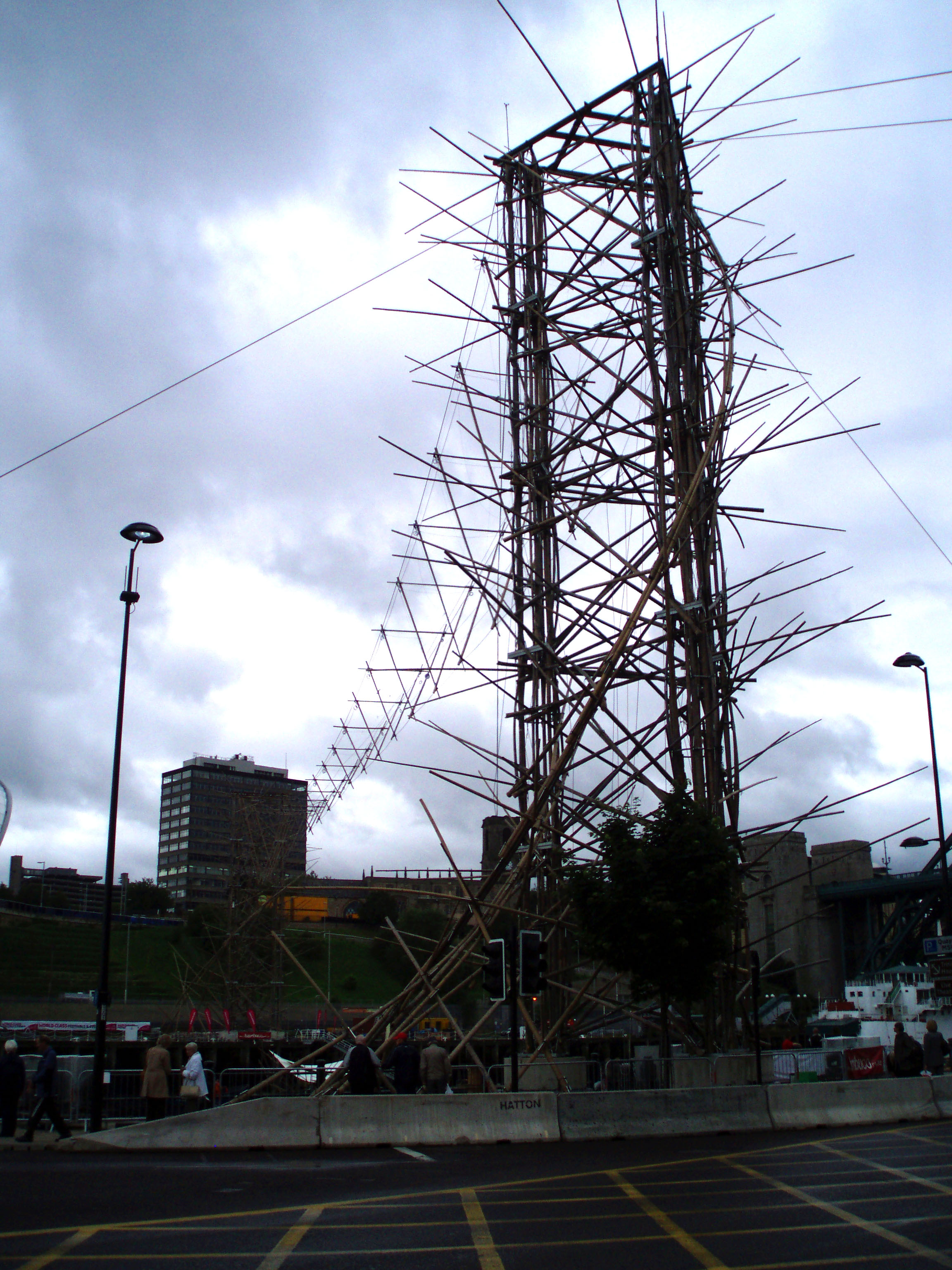
The Newcastle tower of the sculpture

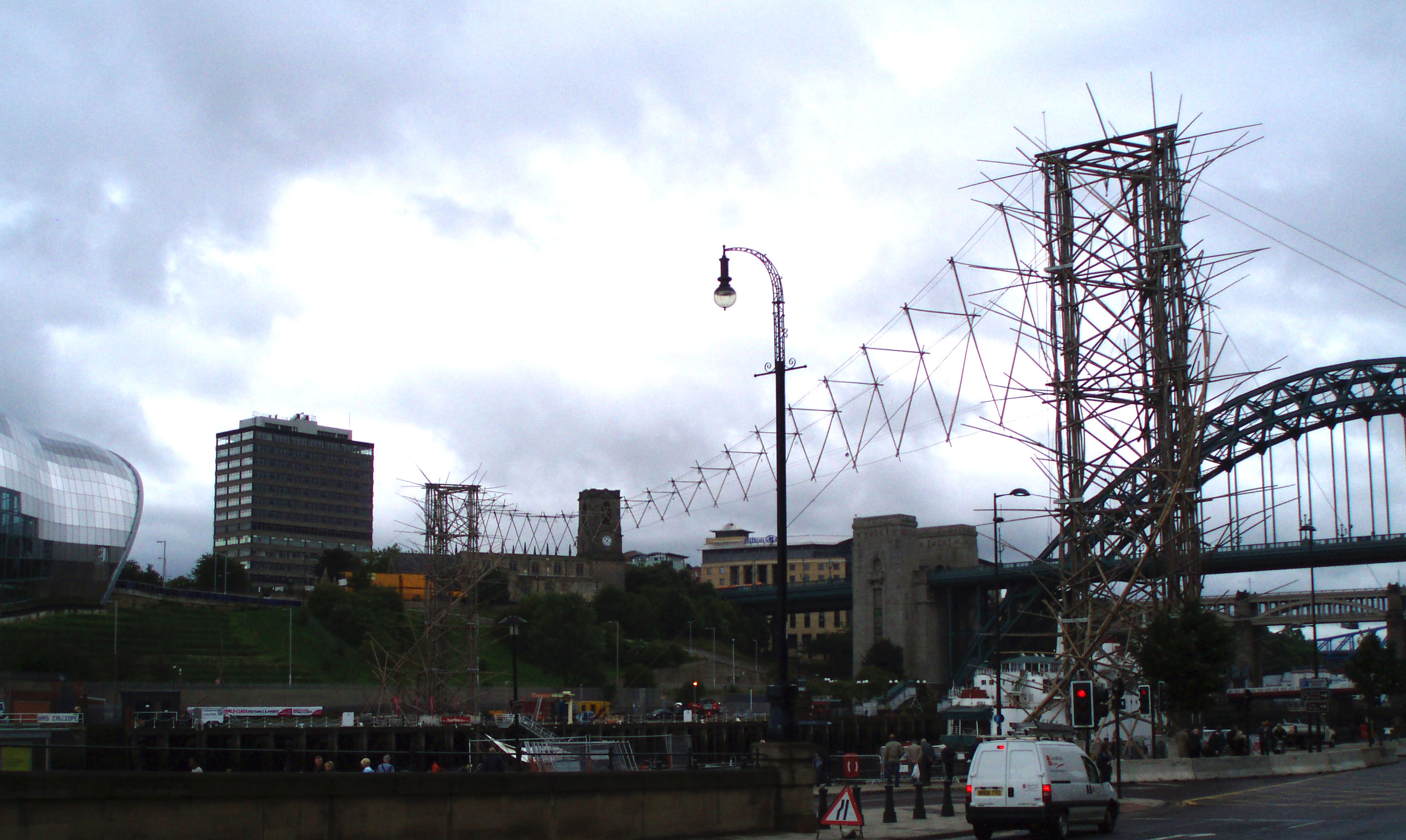
The sculpture with the Tyne Bridge in the background
