= Wyre Rivers Trust =

Waterway trust in Lancashire, England

- Type: Charity
- Headquarters: Southport, Merseyside
- Location: UK
- Region served: Borough of Wyre
- Services: Conservation
- General manager: Thomas Myerscough
- Website: https://wyreriverstrust.org

Wyre Rivers Trust is an environmental organisation based in the Borough of Wyre, Lancashire, England. A subsidiary of The Rivers Trust, its aim is to improve the natural environment around the River Wyre catchment in line with the European Water Framework Directive (WFD). It is a registered charity, with its registered office being in Southport, Merseyside.

Its partner companies include Wyre Council, the Royal Society of Biology and United Utilities.

The company's motto is From Bowland to Bay, and its general manager is Thomas Myerscough.
