= River Tyne =

River in North East England

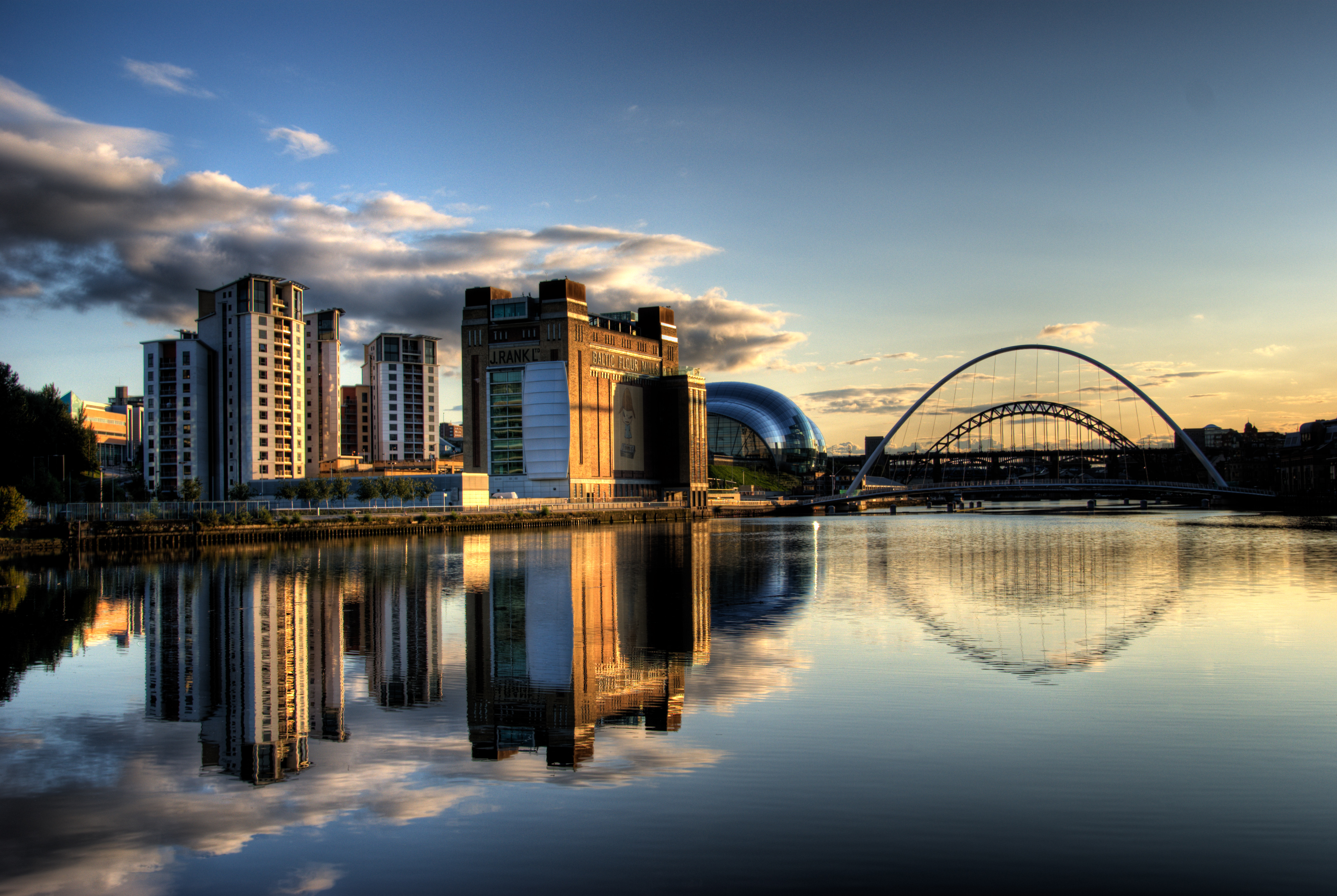
- River Tyne Gateshead Quayside

Location
- Country: United Kingdom
- Constituent country: England
- County: Cumbria; Northumberland; Tyne and Wear

Physical characteristics
- Source: South Tyne
  - location: Alston Moor, Cumbria, England
- 2nd source: North Tyne
  - location: Deadwater Fell, Kielder, Northumberland, England
- Mouth: Tynemouth
  - location: Tynemouth, North Tyneside, England
  - coordinates: 55°0′37″N 1°25′8″W
- Length: 118 km (73 mi)
- Basin size: 2,933 km^{2} (1,132 sq mi)
- Discharge
  - location: Bywell
  - average: 44.6 m^{3}/s (1,580 cu ft/s)

Basin features
- Tributaries
  - left: River Derwent, River Team, River Don
  - right: Ouse Burn

The Swing Bridge, the Tyne Bridge and the Gateshead Millennium Bridge in the background in Newcastle upon Tyne

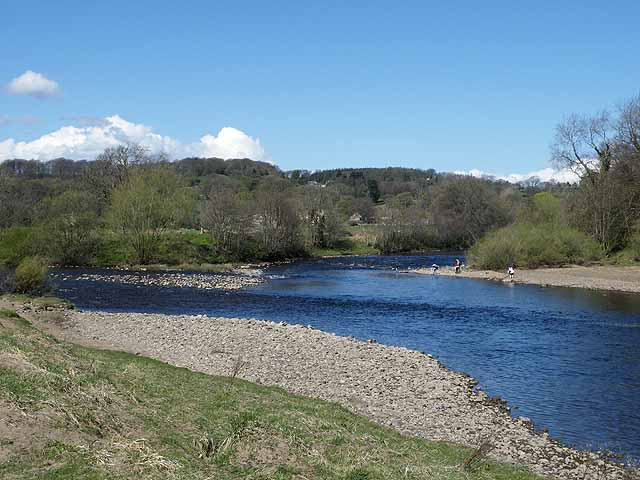
Confluence of North (right) and South Tyne (left) near Warden

The River Tyne /ˈtaɪn/ is a river in North East England. Its length (excluding tributaries) is 73 miles (118 km). It is formed by the North Tyne and the South Tyne, which converge at Warden near Hexham in Northumberland at a place dubbed 'The Meeting of the Waters'.

The Tyne Rivers Trust measure the whole Tyne catchment as 2,936 km^{2} (1,134 square miles), containing 4,399 km (2,733 miles) of waterways.

== Course ==
=== North Tyne ===
The Ordnance Survey records 'the source of the North Tyne river' at grid reference NY 605974 at Deadwater, a few tens of metres short of the Scottish border. It flows southeast through the village of Kielder before entering first Bakethin Reservoir and then Kielder Water, both set within Kielder Forest. It then passes by the village of Bellingham before the River Rede enters as a left-bank tributary at Redesmouth. It passes Hadrian's Wall near Chollerford before joining the South Tyne near Warden to the northwest of Hexham.

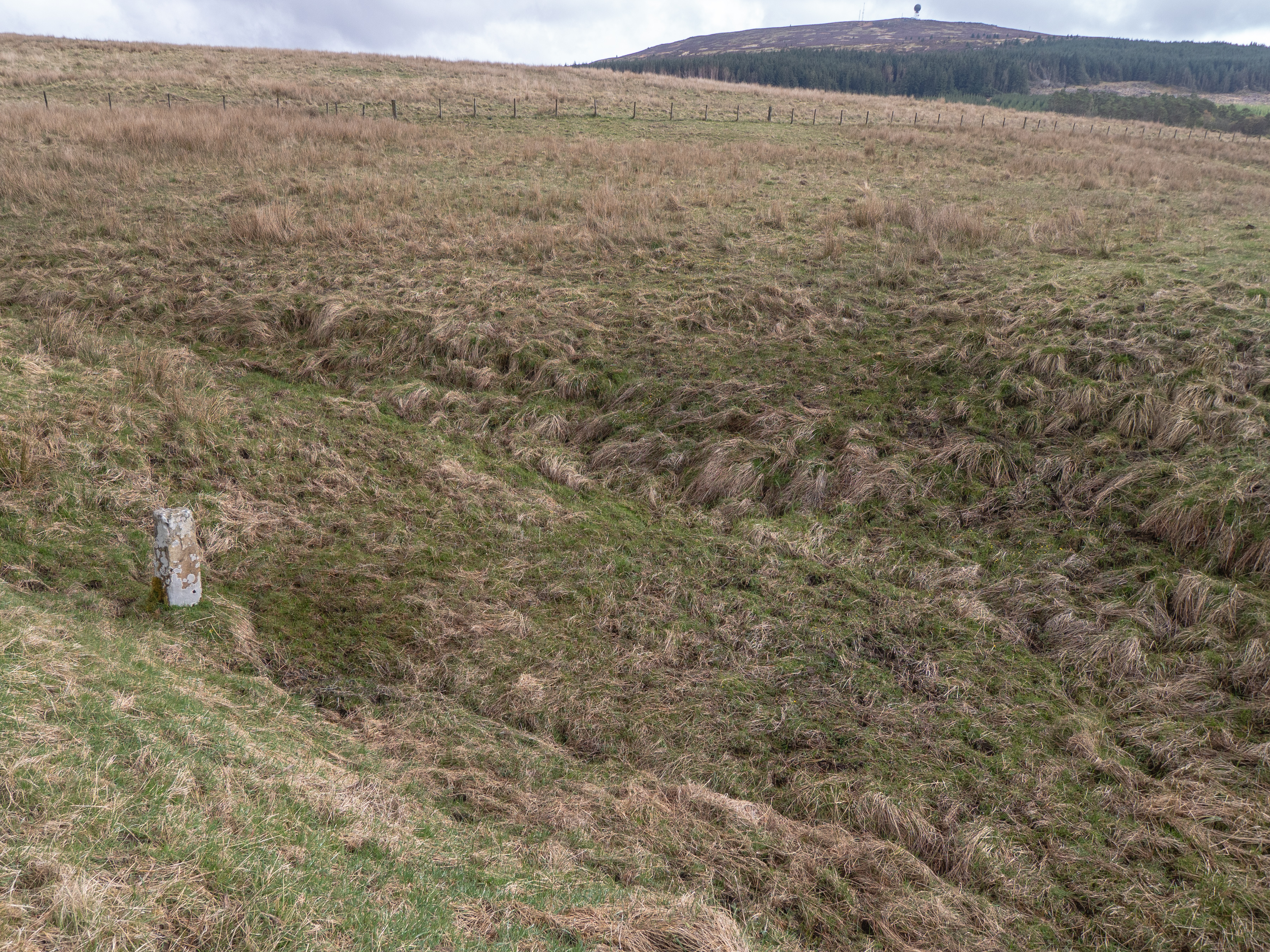
A stone marker shows the source of the River North Tyne

=== South Tyne ===
The South Tyne rises at Tyne Head on Alston Moor, Cumbria close to the sources of the Tees and the Wear. Initially it flows north through the North Pennines Area of Outstanding Natural Beauty (AONB), enters Northumberland downstream of Alston and turns to the east as it approaches the town of Haltwhistle. Paralleling Hadrian's Wall which lies to the north, the river continues past Redburn and Haydon Bridge to join the North Tyne at Warden. This low level east-west corridor through the Pennines is referred to as the Tyne Gap.

=== Tyne ===
From the confluence of the North and South Tyne at Warden, the river flows east through Northumberland by Hexham, Corbridge and Prudhoe and enters the county of Tyne and Wear to the east of Wylam. The river subsequently forms the boundary between Newcastle upon Tyne on the north bank and the Borough of Gateshead on the south bank for 13 miles (21 km), in the course of which it flows under ten bridges. To the east of Gateshead and Newcastle, the Tyne divides Hebburn and Jarrow on the south bank from Walker and Wallsend on the north bank, forming the boundary between the boroughs of North Tyneside and South Tyneside. The Tyne Tunnel runs under the river to link Jarrow and Wallsend and is roughly where the mouth of the River Don forms. Finally the river flows between South Shields and Tynemouth into the North Sea.

== Geography ==
Thomas John Taylor (1810–1861) theorised that the main course of the river anciently flowed through what is now Team Valley, its outlet into the tidal river being by a waterfall at Bill Point (in the area of Bill Quay). His theory was not far from the truth, as there is evidence that prior to the last ice age, the River Wear once followed the current route of the lower River Team and merged with the Tyne at Dunston. Ice diverted the course of the Wear to its current location, flowing east the course of the Tyne and joining the North Sea at Sunderland.

The River Tyne is estimated to be around 30 million years old.

Islands (aits) in the Tyne include Broomhaugh Island and Gold Island. Many of the aits that were once there are now gone due to dredging, such as Kings Meadow, Clarenee Islands (or Clarence: sources differ), Little Annie, and Ryton Island.

== Conservation ==
The conservation of the Tyne has been handled by various bodies over the past 500 years. Conservation bodies have included Newcastle Trinity House, and the Tyne Improvement Commission.

The Tyne Improvement Commission conservation was created by the River Tyne Improvement Act 1850 (13 & 14 Vict. c. lxiii) and lasted until 1968. The 1850–1950 era was the worst period for pollution of the river. The Tyne Improvement Commission laid the foundations for what has become the modern day Port of Tyne. Under the management of the Tyne Improvement Commissioners, over a period of the first 70 years the Tyne was deepened from 6 to 30 ft (1.8 to 9.1 metres) and had 150 million tonnes dredged from it. During these 70 years, the two Tyne piers were built; Northumbrian, Tyne and Albert Docks were built, as well as the staithes at Whitehill and Dunston. This infrastructure enabled millions of tonnes of cargo to be handled by the Port by 1910. The tidal river has been managed by the Port of Tyne Authority since 1968.

The River Tyne has a charity dedicated to protecting and enhancing its waters and surrounding areas. The Tyne Rivers Trust, established in 2004, is a community-based organisation that works to improve habitat, promote better understanding of the Tyne catchment area and build the reputation of the Tyne catchment as a place of environmental excellence.

== Port of Tyne ==
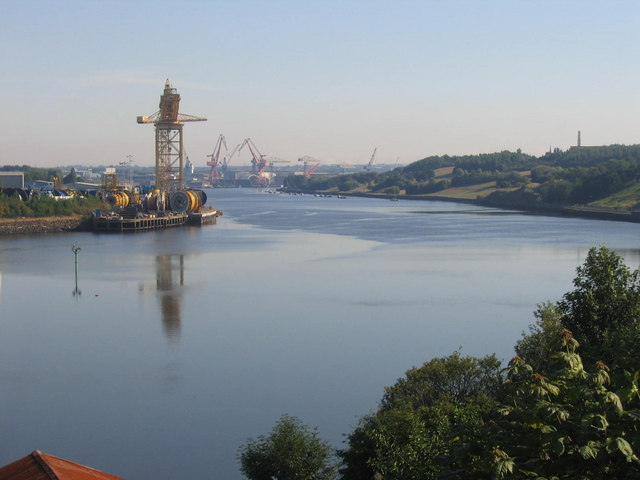
The River Tyne at Bill Quay

With its proximity to surrounding coalfields, the Tyne was a major route for the export of coal from the 13th century until the decline of the coal mining industry in North East England in the second half of the 20th century. The largest coal staithes (a structure for loading coal onto ships) were located at Dunston in Gateshead, Hebburn and Tyne Dock, South Shields. The wooden staithes at Dunston, built in 1890, have been preserved, although they were partially destroyed by fire in 2006 and then a further fire in May 2020 means that the Staithes is becoming more vulnerable to vandalism and would need extensive financing to preserve it and make it secure. In 2016, Tyne Dock, South Shields was still involved with coal, importing 2 million tonnes of shipments a year. The lower reaches of the Tyne were, in the late 19th and early 20th centuries, one of the world's most important centres of shipbuilding, and there are still shipyards in South Shields and Hebburn to the south of the river. To support the shipbuilding and export industries of Tyneside, the lower reaches of the river were extensively remodelled during the second half of the 19th century, with islands (including Kings Meadow, the largest) removed and meanders in the river straightened.

== Name and etymology ==
Nothing definite is known of the origin of the designation Tyne, nor is the river known by that name until the Saxon period: Tynemouth is recorded in Anglo-Saxon as Tinanmuðe (probably dative case). The Vedra on the Roman map of Britain may be the Tyne or the Wear. Ptolemy's Tína could be a "misplaced reference" to either this river or the Tyne in East Lothian. There is a theory that *tīn was a word that meant "river" in the local Celtic language or in a language spoken in England before the Celts came: compare Tardebigge.

A supposed pre-Celtic root *tei, meaning 'to melt, to flow' has also been proposed as an etymological explanation of the Tyne and similarly named rivers, as has a Brittonic derivative of Indo-European *teihx, meaning 'to be dirty' (Welsh tail, 'manure').

== River crossings ==
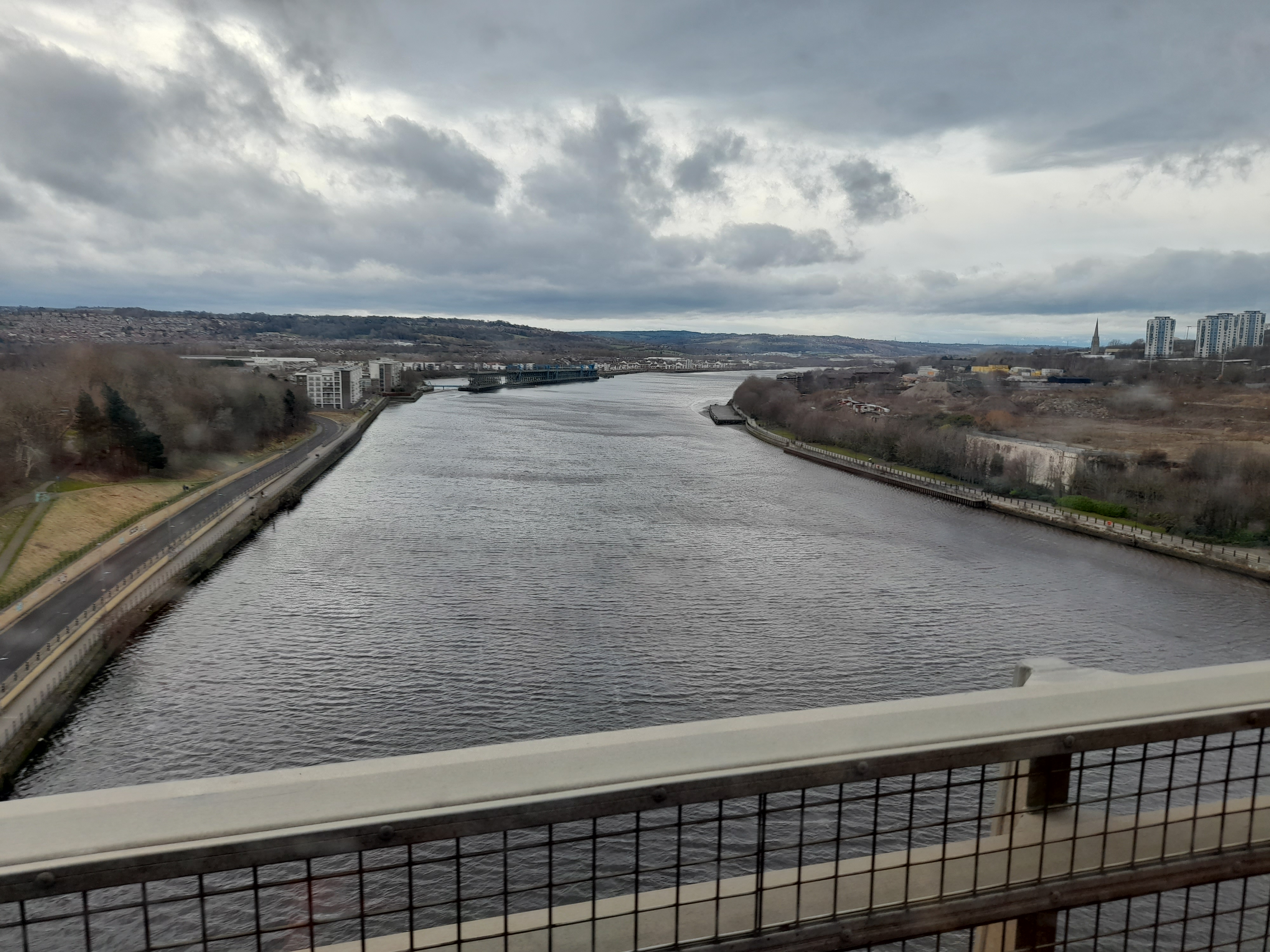
River Tyne seen from Redheugh Bridge, Newcastle looking westward.

== In popular literature ==
LJ Ross' thriller Seven Bridges from the DCI Ryan series evolves around the Tyne bridges.

== Artworks and sculpture ==
=== Newcastle-upon-Tyne ===
River God Tyne by David Wynne at Newcastle Civic Centre

The river is represented, and personified, in a sculpture unveiled in 1968 as part of the new Civic Centre (seat of Newcastle City Council). Sculpted by David Wynne, the massive bronze figure River God Tyne incorporates flowing water into its design.

=== Salmon Trail ===
The Environment Agency is currently working with architects and cultural consultancy xsite, in collaboration with Commissions North, to create a travelling sculpture trail along the River Tyne.

The Tyne Salmon Trail served as a celebration of the river, its heritage and its increasingly diverse ecosystem. The trail looks to capture the imagination of residents and tourists visiting the area by providing them with the ultimate 'fact finding' design experience, which celebrates the salmon's migratory journey in the Northeast of England.

FINS, REFLECTION and JOURNEY were the first three cubes to be launched in December 2007 from a family of ten. Each cube is inspired by the textures, changing colours, movement and journey of the salmon. With each offering a 'modern day keepsake' to take away, in the form of a designed Bluetooth message.

The other cubes will be moving along the River Tyne over one year visiting different locations from Kielder to the Mouth of the Tyne in the summer 2008 before starting their long journey back to their birthplace.

=== Conversation Piece ===
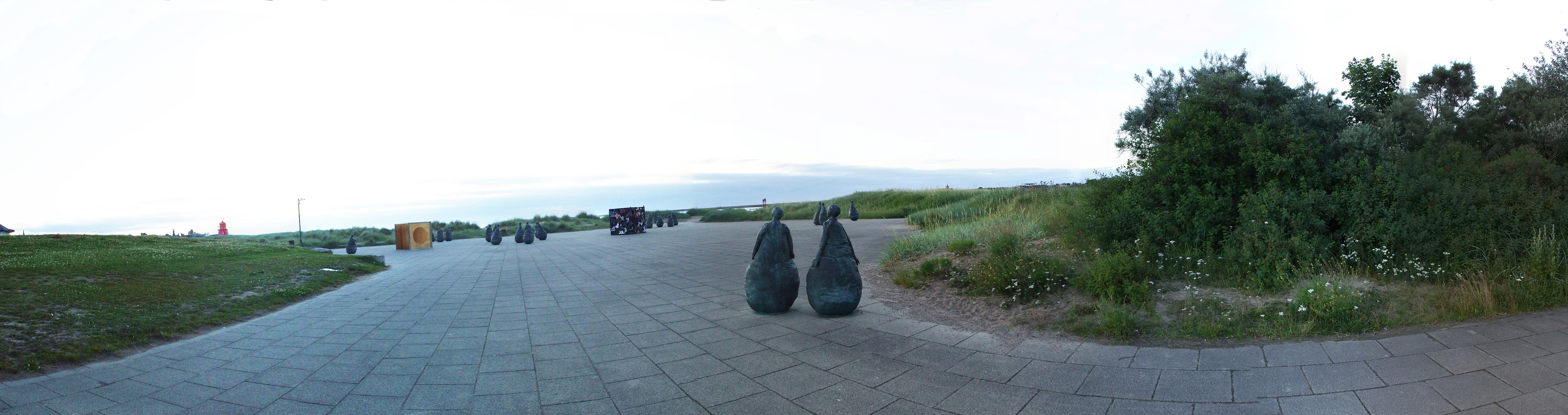
Created by acclaimed Spanish sculptor, Juan Muñoz in 1999. Celebrating the Tyne Salmon; here with the 2008 River Tyne Bluetooth Salmon Trail Cubes, are the 22 bronze life size figures that command and celebrate a superb view of South Shields Harbour and the Tyne Piers.

=== Bamboo Bridge ===
For three days, from 18 to 20 July 2008, a temporary bamboo artwork was installed over the Tyne close to the Gateshead Millennium Bridge. The Bambuco Bridge was created as part of that year's 'SummerTyne' festival.

== See also ==
- List of rivers of the United Kingdom
- The Boat Race of the North, an annual series of races held on the Tyne between Durham and Newcastle universities
- The Rivers Trust – Waterway society in the UK and Ireland
- Tyne-class lifeboat – Former RNLI lifeboat class
- Tyne Valley, Prince Edward Island
- Tyne, the name of one of the sea areas of the British Shipping Forecast.
- Tuxedo floating nightclubs – Repurposed moored car ferries (1983–2011)
