= Wye and Usk Foundation =

Environmental charity in Talgarth, Wales

The Wye and Usk Foundation is an environmental charity based in Talgarth, Powys in Wales which seeks to secure and improve the natural environment of the River Wye and River Usk for the benefit of local communities, anglers and others. Founded in 1995 in response to a decline in Atlantic salmon, it is a member of The Rivers Trust and operates both in the Welsh and English parts of the catchments. The foundation maintains webcams on the two rivers and on the Wye's major tributaries, the River Lugg and the River Monnow. The Trust carries out habitat conservation work such as managing riparian vegetation and fencing out grazing animals to decrease trampling, not just on the main rivers but also on numerous tributaries. Other work includes construction of fish passes around weirs, litter clearance, re-gravelling of sections of river depleted of their natural supply and dealing with invasive non-native species such as giant hogweed and American signal crayfish.
