= Rivers and Fisheries Trusts of Scotland =

Scottish waterway charity

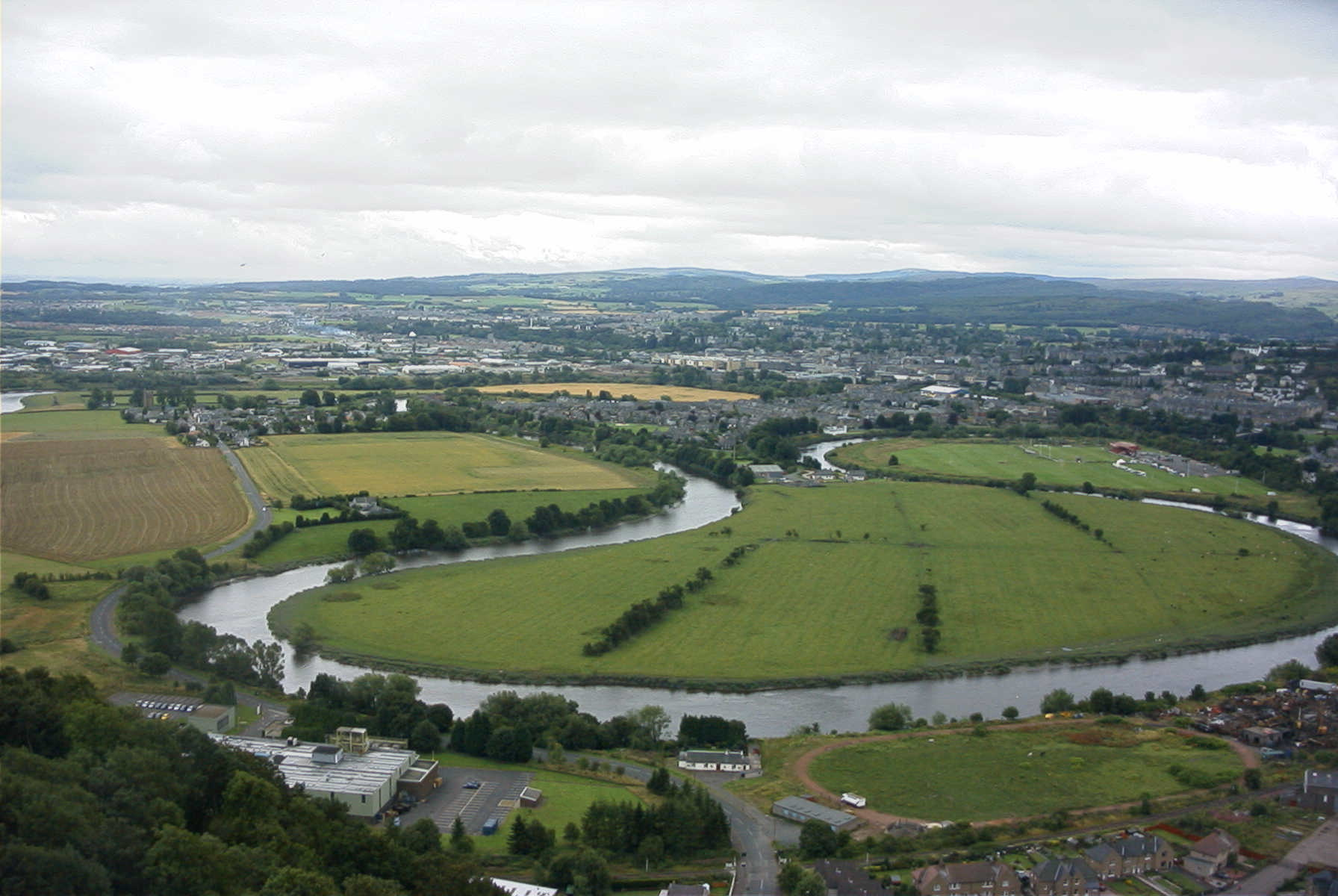
River Forth

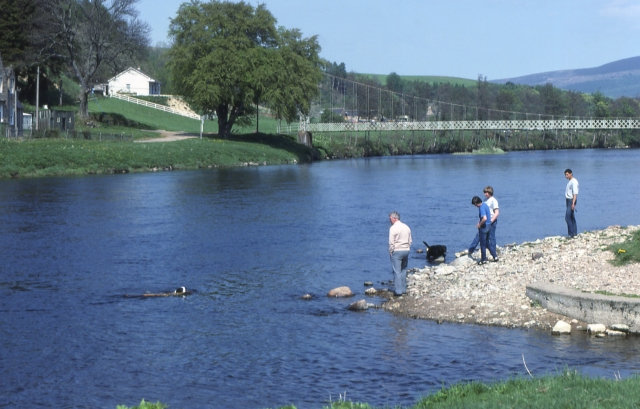
River Spey

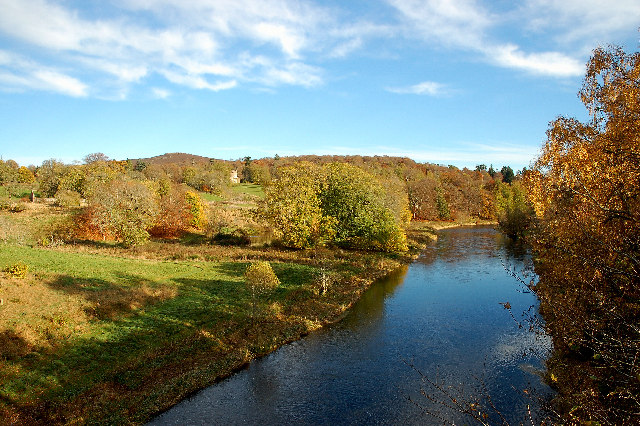
River Don near Alford

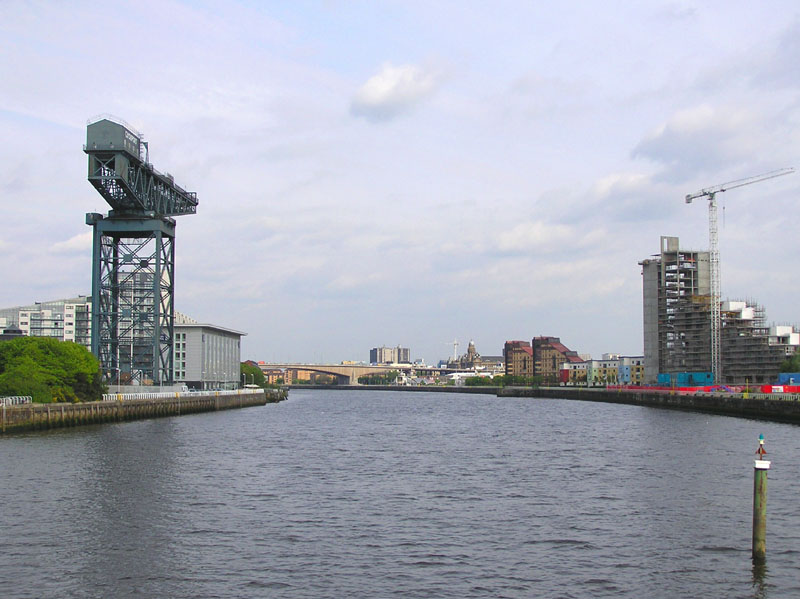
River Clyde

The Rivers and Fisheries Trusts of Scotland (RAFTS) (also known as the Association of Scottish River & Fishery Management Trusts) is a waterway society, an unincorporated association, a Scottish charity, and an umbrella organisation for river trusts in Scotland, based in Edinburgh.

RAFTS is the representative of all of Scotland's river systems. It develops Codes of Conduct and educational opportunities.

The work of RAFTS includes research, monitoring, conservation, education, training, practical restoration work, and provision of advice to fishery and riparian owners.

RAFTS works with schools, local authorities, biodiversity action groups, public bodies, government bodies, businesses, private individuals, fishery owners, anglers and district salmon fishery boards.

List of members:

- Atlantic Salmon Trust
- Argyll Fisheries Trust
- Association of Salmon Fishery Boards
- Galloway Fisheries Trust
- Loch Lomond Fisheries Trust

== See also ==
- List of rivers in Scotland
- List of waterway societies in the United Kingdom
- Association of Rivers Trusts (ART) – English/Welsh equivalent to RAFTS
