= Tyne Rivers Trust =

British charitable organisation

Tyne Rivers Trust is the charity which acts as the guardian of the River Tyne in North East England. It works with people and communities to protect and enhance the River Tyne and its tributaries, so they are healthy, biodiverse, and an asset for present and future generations. It is a registered charity.

The Trust has been working to improve the Tyne catchment since 2004. In that time the Trust has reduced the number of barriers to fish migrating upstream, improved huge amounts of river habitat and improved the quality of water so that aquatic life can thrive. Working with schoolchildren and communities that live along the Tyne, it also helps future generations to understand the value of the river.

The charity works with volunteers who carry out practical tasks to keep the river in good health from removing invasive species to restoring riverbanks and planting trees to reduce the risk of flooding.

In 2022, Northumbrian Water paid £165,000 to the Tyne Rivers Trust after an incident in 2018 when a quantity of sewage was discharged into the Tyne.
