= 1858 in architecture =

The year 1858 in architecture involved some significant events.

== Events ==
- The competition to design Central Park in New York City is won by Frederick Law Olmsted and Calvert Vaux.
- Eugène Viollet-le-Duc begins publication of his Entretiens sur l'architecture in book form, systematizing his approach to architecture and architectural education in a method radically opposed to that of the École des Beaux-Arts, and notable for its use of drawings in axonometric projection.

== Buildings and structures ==
=== Buildings ===
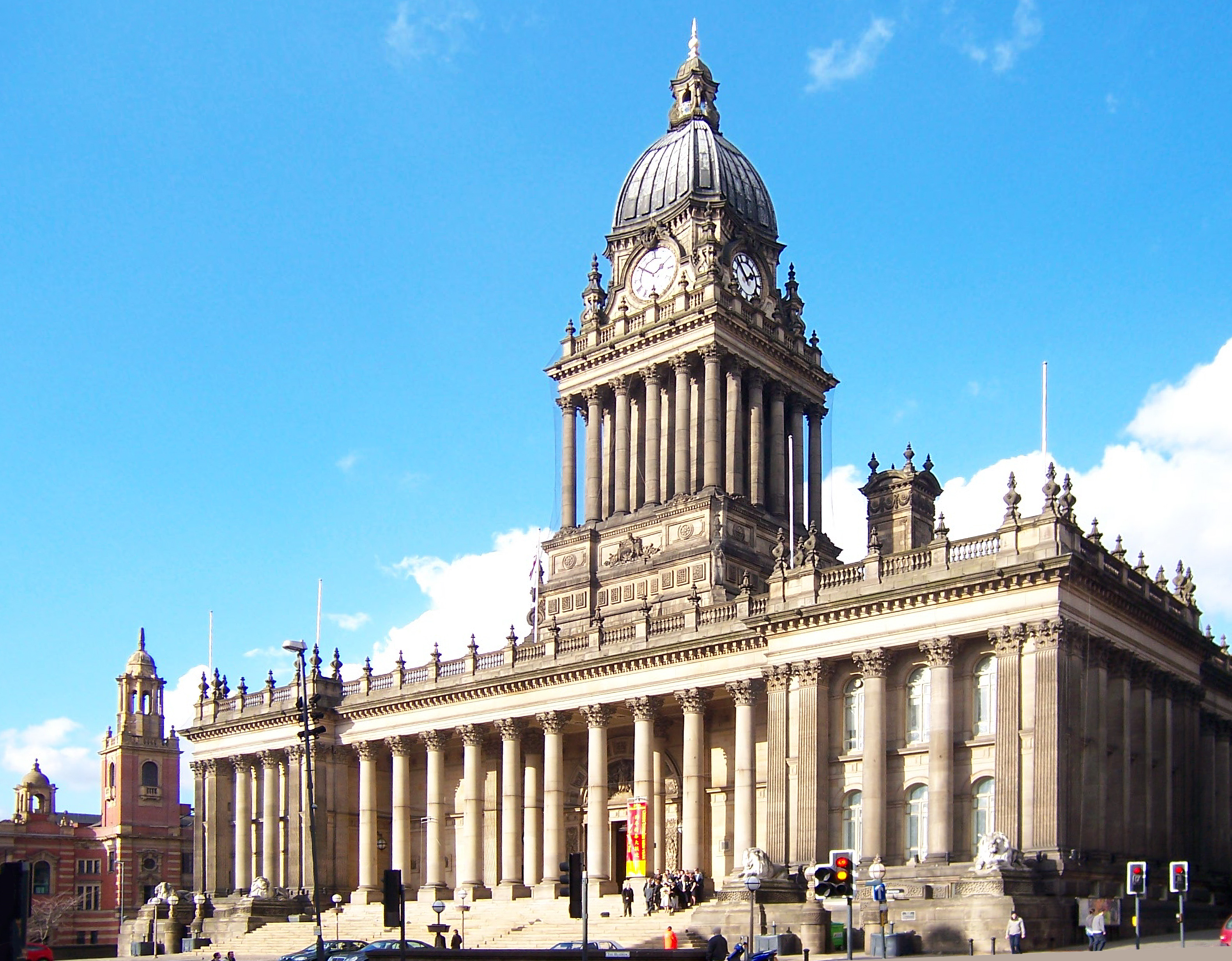
Leeds Town Hall

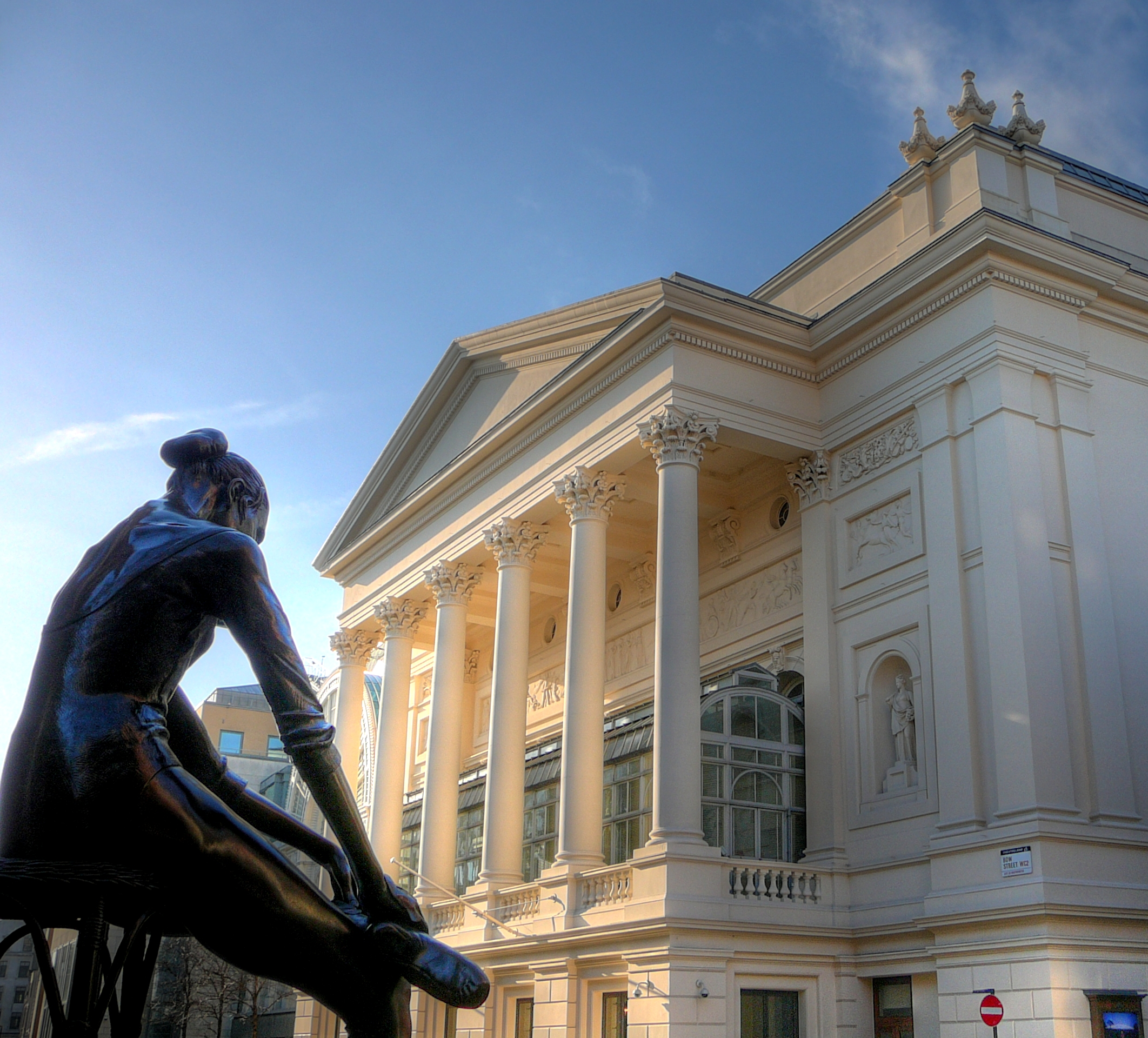
Royal Opera House, Covent Garden

- The Hamilton Mausoleum in Scotland is completed to an 1842 design by David Hamilton by David Bryce with sculptor Alexander Handyside Ritchie.
- Saint Isaac's Cathedral in Saint Petersburg (Russia) is completed to an 1818 design by Auguste de Montferrand.
- Trinity Church (Oslo) in Norway, designed by Alexis de Chateauneuf and Wilhelm von Hanno, is consecrated.
- New parish Church of St George, Doncaster, Yorkshire, England, designed by George Gilbert Scott, is consecrated.
- Wesley Church, Melbourne, Australia, is opened.
- Leopoldstädter Tempel (synagogue) in Vienna, designed by Ludwig Förster, is built.
- Grand Synagogue of Aden is built.
- Church of the Resurrection in Katowice (Poland) is completed.
- Fishergate Baptist Church in Preston, Lancashire (England), designed by James Hibbert and Nathan Rainford, is completed.
- Leeds Town Hall in Yorkshire (England), designed by Cuthbert Brodrick, is completed.
- Ontario County Courthouse in Canandaigua, New York, is built.
- United States Customhouse and Post Office (Bath, Maine) is built.
- The Liverpool, London and Globe Building (insurance office) in Liverpool (England), designed by C. R. Cockerell, is completed.
- The West of England and South Wales Bank in Bristol (England), designed by Bruce Gingell and T. R. Lysaght, is completed.
- The rebuilt Royal Opera House, Covent Garden, London, designed by Edward Middleton Barry, is completed.
- St James's Hall (concert hall), Piccadilly, London, designed by Owen Jones, is opened.
- Hownes Gill Viaduct in County Durham, England, designed by Thomas Bouch, is opened.
- New westwork at Speyer Cathedral (Bavaria), designed by Heinrich Hübsch, is completed.
- Construction of Woodchester Mansion (Spring Park) in Gloucestershire, England, designed by Benjamin Bucknall, is begun; work is abandoned in the 1870s.

== Awards ==
- RIBA Royal Gold Medal – Friedrich August Stüler.
- Grand Prix de Rome, architecture: Georges-Ernest Coquart.

== Births ==
- March 9 – Gustav Stickley, American furniture designer and architect (died 1942)
- August 9 – John William Simpson, English architect (died 1933)
- October 30 – Wilson Eyre, American architect (died 1944)
- December 26 – Torolf Prytz, Norwegian architect, goldsmith and Liberal politician (died 1938)
- Leonard Stokes, English architect (died 1925)

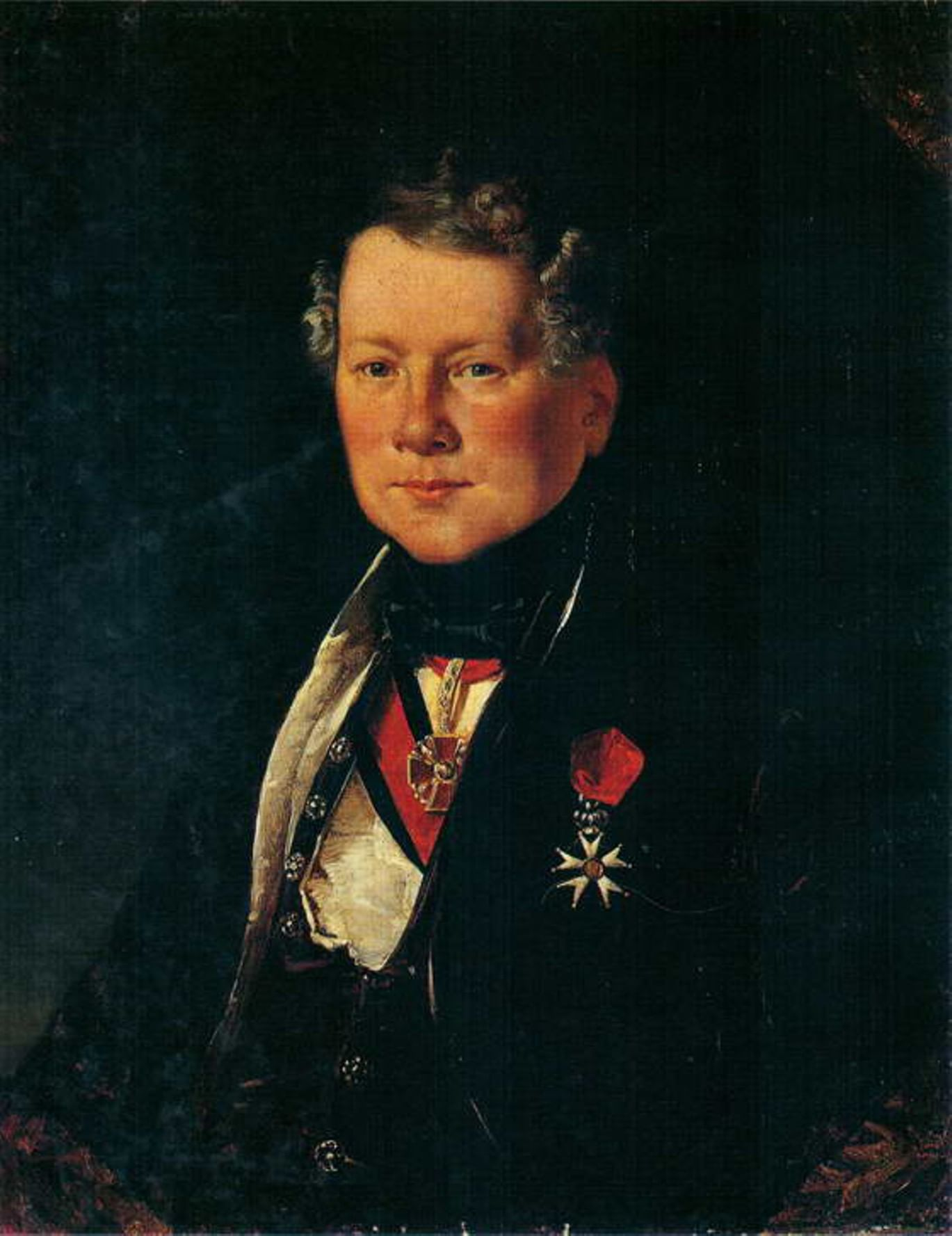
Auguste de Montferrand

== Deaths ==
- February 19 – Alexander Black, Scottish architect (born c.1790)
- February 24 – Thomas Hamilton, Scottish architect (born 1784)
- June 28 – Auguste de Montferrand, French-born architect (born 1786)
- November 12 – Edward Cresy, English architect and civil engineer (born 1792)
- November 14 – Benjamin Green, English architect (born 1813)
