= Nihal Gurusinghe =

British neurosurgeon

Nihal Gurusinghe MBE
- Gurusinghe receiving the Society of British Neurological Surgeons Medal at the SBNS conference gala dinner in September 2024,
- Born: Nihal Trevor Gurusinghe
- Education: University of Ceylon (MBBS)
- Occupation: Neurosurgeon
- Years active: 1970–present
- Medical career
- Institutions: Lancashire Teaching Hospitals NHS Foundation Trust

Nihal Trevor Gurusinghe MBE is a British neurosurgeon who has worked in the National Health Service (NHS) since December 1975, completing 50 years of NHS service in December 2025. He has served as a consultant neurosurgeon at the Lancashire Teaching Hospitals NHS Foundation Trust and is an honorary professor at the University of Central Lancashire. He was appointed a Member of the Order of the British Empire (MBE) in the 2023 New Year Honours.

== Academic and professional roles ==
Gurusinghe qualified as a doctor in Sri Lanka and moved to the United Kingdom in December 1975 to pursue a career in neurosurgery. He began working in the National Health Service that month. After holding several positions and undertaking neurosurgical training at hospitals in London, he was appointed consultant neurosurgeon at the Royal Preston Hospital, part of the Lancashire Teaching Hospitals NHS Trust, in October 1985. He thereby became the first Sri Lankan to be appointed as a consultant neurosurgeon in the United Kingdom. He has continued to serve at the Trust and completed 50 years of NHS service in December 2025.

At the Trust, Gurusinghe has held several leadership roles, including chairman of the Department of Neurosurgery from 2000 to 2009 and clinical lead for the neurovascular service. He was appointed Honorary Professor at the University of Central Lancashire in May 2016 and has supervised doctoral research and contributed to collaborative research programmes in brain cancer.

Gurusinghe has served as an examiner for the FRCS (Neurosurgery) examinations, including roles with the Royal College of Surgeons of Edinburgh and international conjoint examinations with surgical colleges in Hong Kong and Singapore. He has also been a member of the Specialty Surgical Board (Neurosurgery) of the Royal College of Surgeons of Edinburgh.

He has been involved in neurosurgical education and training throughout his career, including service as chairman and programme director of the Specialist Training Subcommittee for Neurosurgery in the North West region from 1998 to 2007. Cambridge University Press has noted his extensive experience as a neurosurgical trainer. BIDA Journal reported that he has trained many neurosurgeons in the United Kingdom and from other countries, including India and Sri Lanka. He has also supported neurosurgical training in Sri Lanka; a number of Sri Lankan neurosurgeons had undertaken periods of training at Preston.

Gurusinghe was elected honorary secretary of the Society of British Neurological Surgeons (SBNS) in 2000 and served until 2005. He was elected to its Council in 2006 and has continued to serve on its Executive Council. He has served on the Council in elected and ex officio capacities for more than 20 years and has also been a member of the society's Academic Committee. In 2011, he became the SBNS coordinator for the National Institute for Health and Care Excellence (NICE), advising on neurosurgical guidelines and interventional procedures.

In November 2009, Gurusinghe travelled to Afghanistan at the request of the United Kingdom's Ministry of Defence to review and report on the neurosurgical services available to NATO forces. The visit involved military transport, preparatory training and the use of full body armour.

=== Sydney Driscoll Neuroscience Foundation ===
Gurusinghe is the founder of the Sydney Driscoll Neuroscience Foundation, a registered charity established in 1989 to support neuroscience education and research at Preston. He served as chairman from 1989 to 2006 and has continued as a trustee.

Since 2018, Gurusinghe has chaired the Oversight Group governing the brain-cancer research collaboration between the foundation and the University of Lancashire.

== Research ==
Gurusinghe's research has focused primarily on clinical neurosurgery, with particular emphasis on neurovascular disorders, spinal tumours, intracranial aneurysms, cavernous malformations, and meningiomas.

His work has included studies on aneurysmal subarachnoid haemorrhage, including radiological grading and the prediction of cerebral vasospasm, as well as the development of regional neurovascular services in the North West of England. He has published on intracranial and spinal tumours, including long-term follow-up studies of benign tumours and investigations into meningioma growth and recurrence.

Gurusinghe has contributed to research on cavernous malformations and vascular anomalies, including case series and systematic reviews. He has also co-authored work on small unruptured intracranial aneurysms, including meta-analyses examining radiological surveillance strategies.

In collaboration with researchers at the University of Central Lancashire, he has participated in translational research projects investigating spectroscopic and computational methods for the characterisation and grading of meningioma tumours, including the use of Raman microspectroscopy and attenuated total reflectance Fourier-transform infrared spectroscopy (ATR-FTIR).

He has served as a local principal investigator for national multicentre clinical trials, including the Trial of Dexamethasone for Chronic Subdural Haematoma, the results of which were published in the New England Journal of Medicine in 2020, and the CARE Cavernoma Trial UK.

== Honours ==
Gurusinghe is a member of the British Medical Association, the Neurosurgical Association of Sri Lanka and the Society of British Neurological Surgeons. He is also a Fellow of the Royal College of Surgeons of Edinburgh. In 2023, he was appointed Member of the Order of the British Empire (MBE) in the King's New Year Honours.

In September 2024, Gurusinghe received the Society of British Neurological Surgeons Medal at the society's meeting in Birmingham in recognition of his contributions to the SBNS and neurosurgery.

In February 2025, Gurusinghe received a Lifetime Achievement Award from the Neurosurgeons Association of Sri Lanka in recognition of his contribution to the support and development of neurosurgery in Sri Lanka.
