= 1786 in architecture =

The year 1786 in architecture involved some significant architectural events and new buildings.

== Buildings and structures ==
=== Buildings completed ===
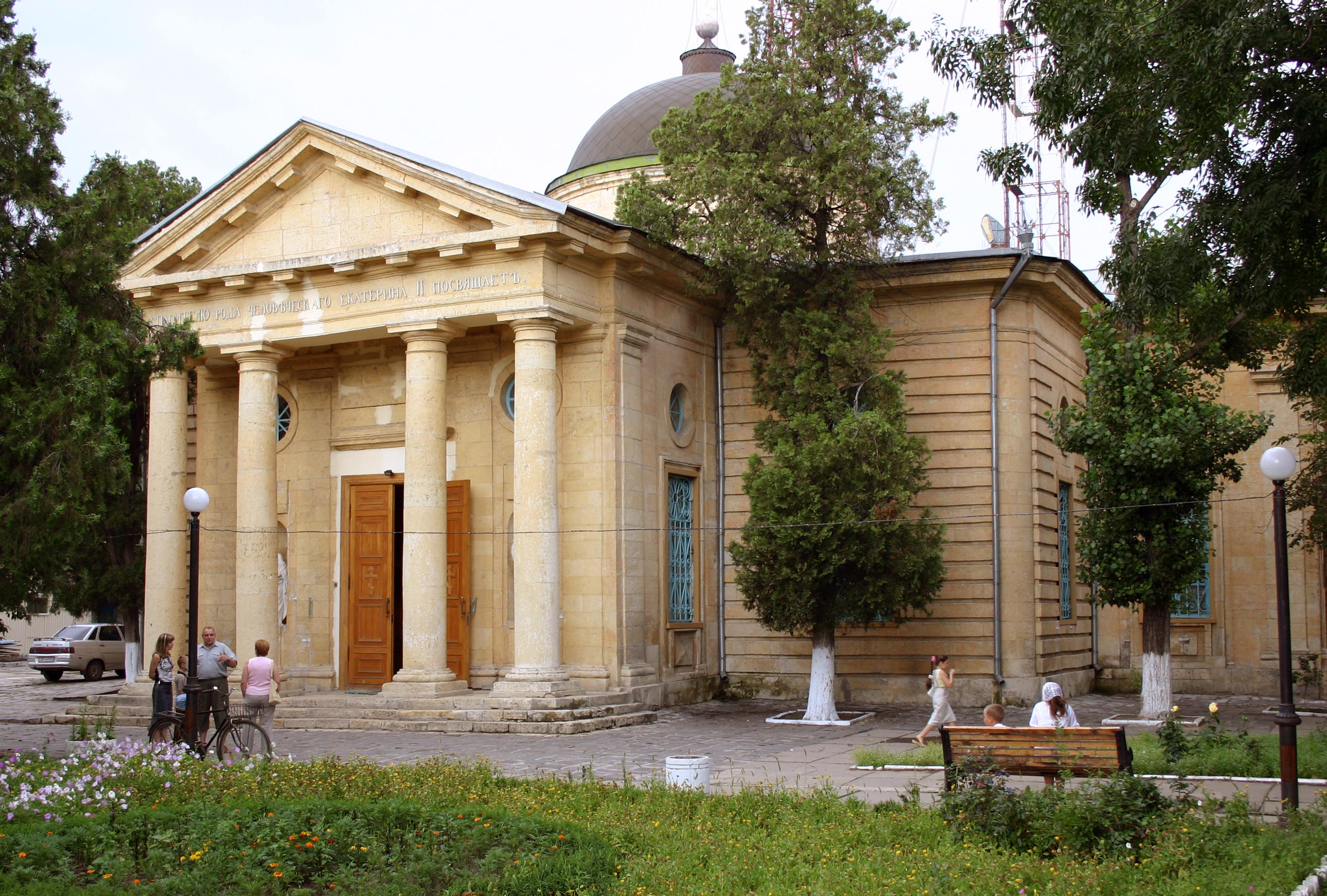
St. Catherine's Cathedral, Kherson

- Casa de Esteban de Luca, Buenos Aires, Argentina.
- Golghar, Patna, India, built by Captain John Garstin.
- Henley Bridge, designed by William Hayward of Shrewsbury, who died before construction was completed.
- Schloss Bellevue in Berlin, Germany, designed by Michael Philipp Boumann.
- St. Catherine's Cathedral, Kherson, Ukraine, built by General Ivan Gannibal.

== Awards ==
- Grand Prix de Rome, architecture: Charles Percier.

== Births ==
- January 23 – Auguste de Montferrand, French Neoclassical architect who worked primarily in Russia (died 1858)
- May 7 – John Watts, Irish military architect (died 1873)

== Deaths ==
- February 28 – John Gwynn, English architect and civil engineer (born 1713)
- October 20 – Humphrey Sturt, British architect (born c.1725)
