= RPH =

RPH may refer to:

- Registered Pharmacist (RPh), in the US
- Radio Print Handicapped Network, or RPH Australia
- Royal Perth Hospital, in Australia
- Royal Preston Hospital, in England
- Rampurhat Junction railway station (station code: RPH), West Bengal, India
