= Preston Royal Infirmary =

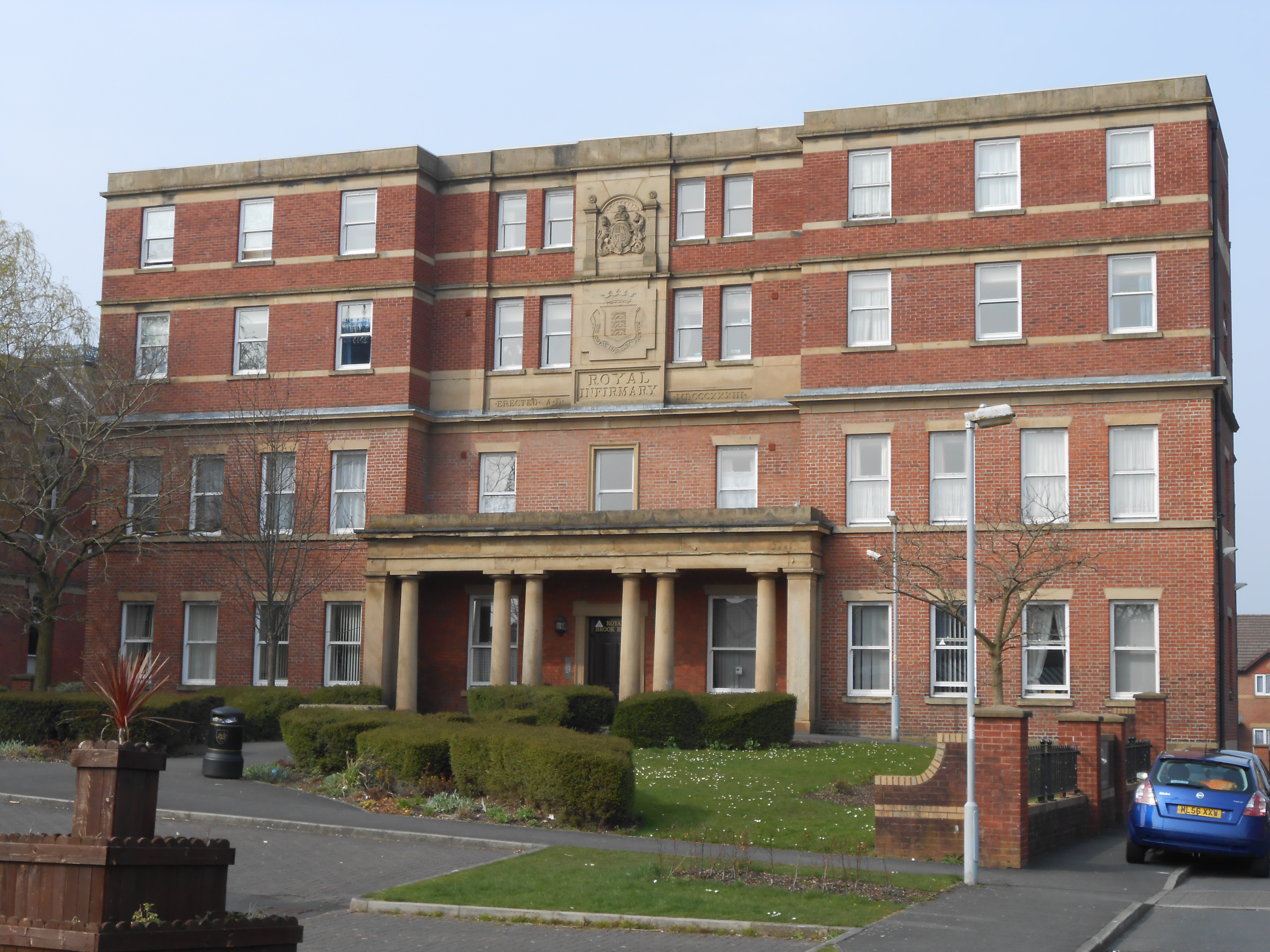
- Main Block

- Shown in Preston

Geography
- Location: Preston, England, United Kingdom
- Coordinates: 53.76603°N 2.69263°W

Organisation
- Care system: Public NHS
- Type: Teaching Hospital

History
- Founded: 1869
- Closed: 1990

Links
- Lists: Hospitals in England

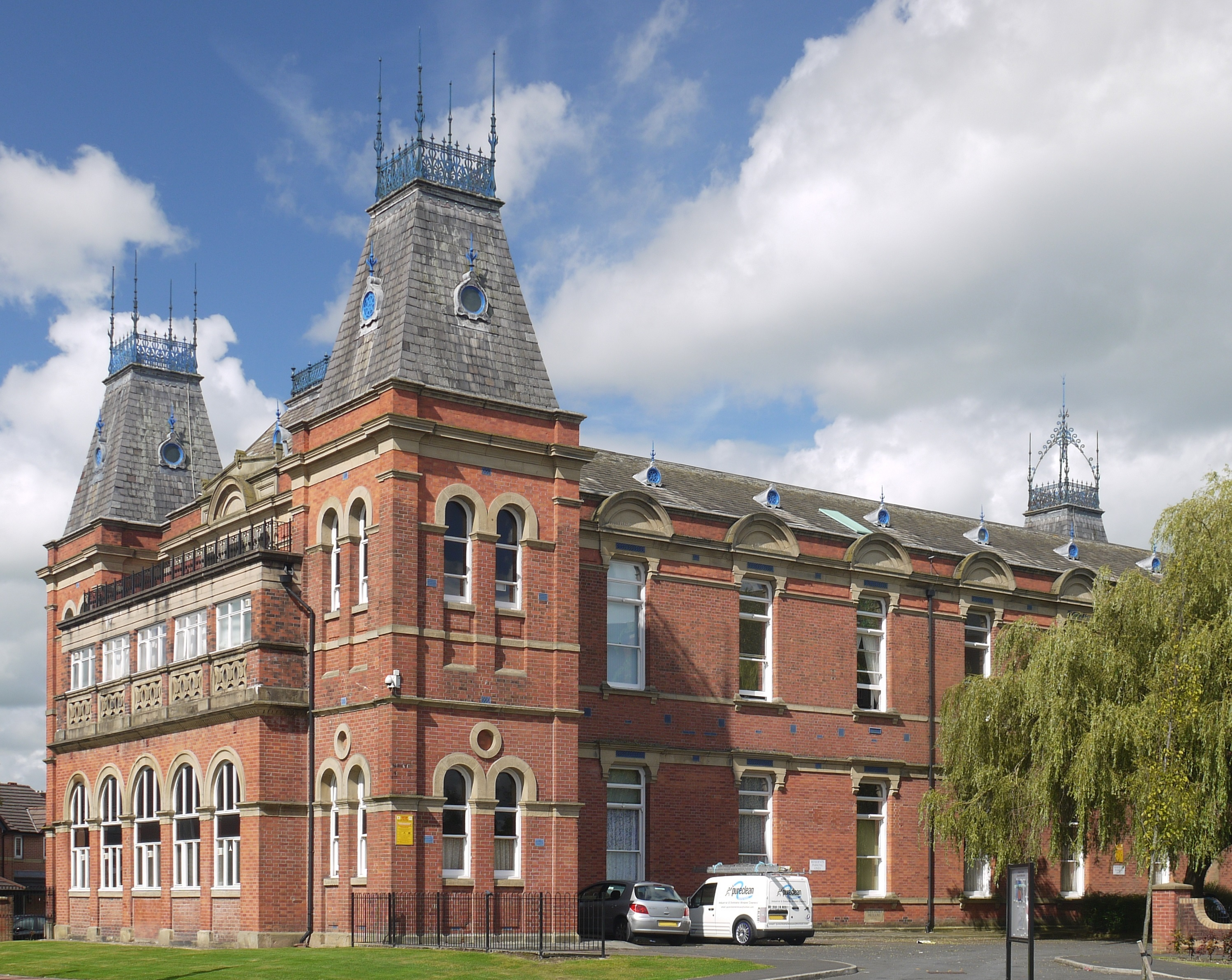
West Wing

The Preston Royal Infirmary was an acute general hospital in Preston, Lancashire, England. Two remaining buildings are Grade II listed buildings.

== History ==
The hospital had its origins in a House of Recovery constructed between 1829 and 1833. It was extended by James Hibbert between 1866 and 1870 to create the Preston and County of Lancaster Royal Infirmary; this facility became the Preston and County of Lancaster Queen Victoria Royal Infirmary in 1929. A further two storeys were added to the main block in 1936.

Picture tiles depicting nursery rhymes, fairy tales, animals and birds dating from 1929 to 1935 were installed in the Alderman Thomas Parkinson Children's Ward in the Princess Mary Wing.

It joined the National Health Service as the Preston Royal Infirmary in 1948 and, after services had transferred to the Royal Preston Hospital, it closed in 1990. Two buildings each gained Grade II listed building status on 7 April 1988, and were subsequently converted for use as student halls of residence.

== Sources ==
- Hartwell, Clare; Pevsner, Nikolaus (2009) [1969], Lancashire: North, The Buildings of England, New Haven and London: Yale University Press, ISBN 978-0-300-12667-9
