= Lobanov-Rostovsky Palace =

Building in Saint Petersburg, Russia

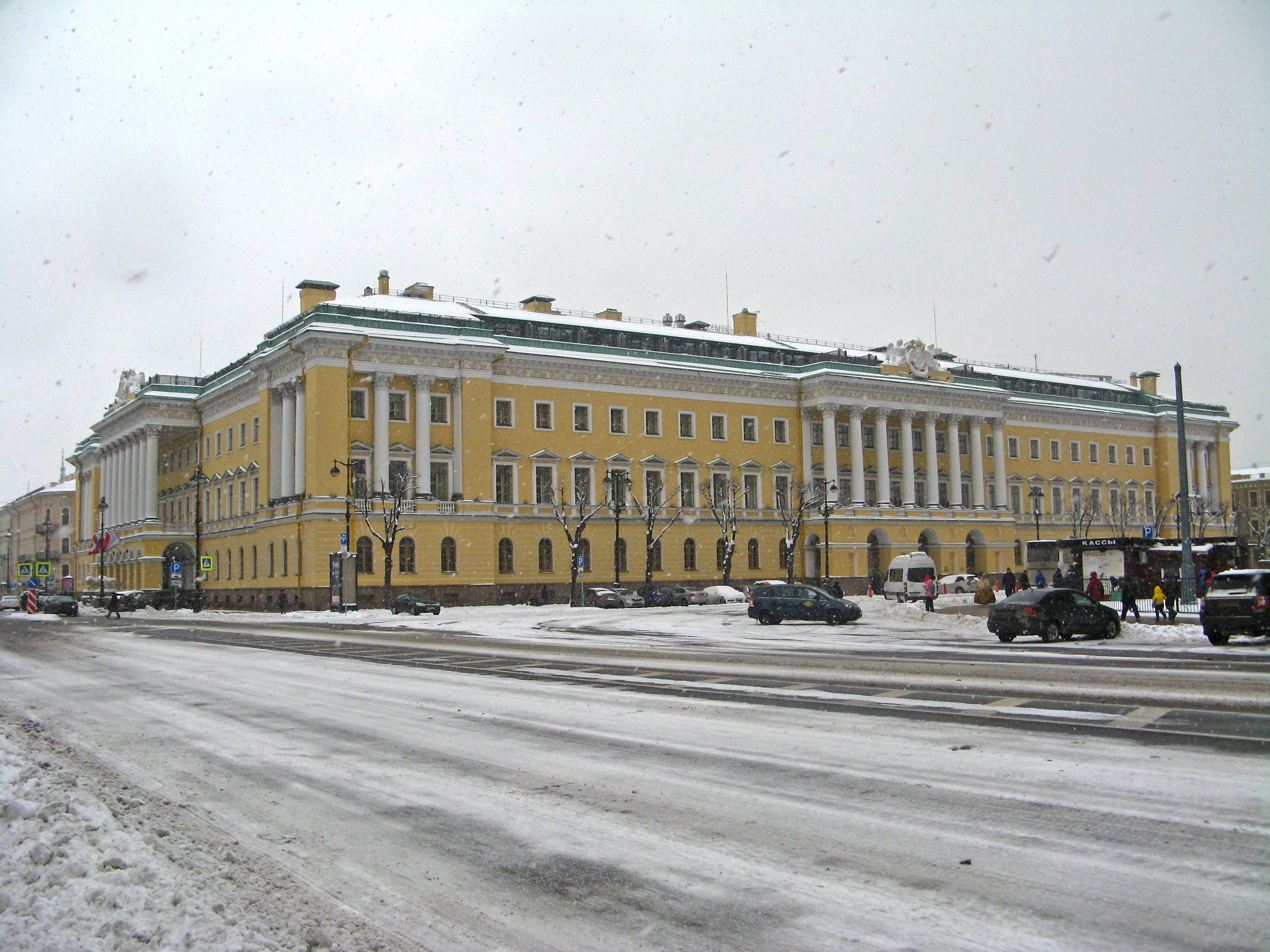
- The palace in February 2016
- Interactive map of the Lobanov-Rostovsky Palace area

General information
- Architectural style: Classicism
- Location: St. Petersburg, Northwestern Federal District, Russia
- Coordinates: 59°56′05″N 30°18′29″E
- Construction started: 1817
- Completed: 1820
- Opened: 2013
- Renovated: 2009
- Client: Prince Lobanov-Rostovsky
- Owner: Four Seasons Hotel Lion Palace

Technical details
- Floor count: 3

Design and construction
- Architect: Auguste de Montferrand

Lobanov-Rostovsky Residence or the Lobanov-Rostovsky Palace is a building at 12 Admiralteysky Avenue in Saint Petersburg, Russia, constructed in 1817-1820 for Prince Alexander Yakovlevich Lobanov-Rostovsky. Today, the building houses a luxury hotel, the Four Seasons Hotel Lion Palace, named for the two Medici Lions at the main entrance.

It is not to be confused with the Lobanov-Rostovsky House at 43, Myasnitskaya Street, Moscow.

== Architecture ==
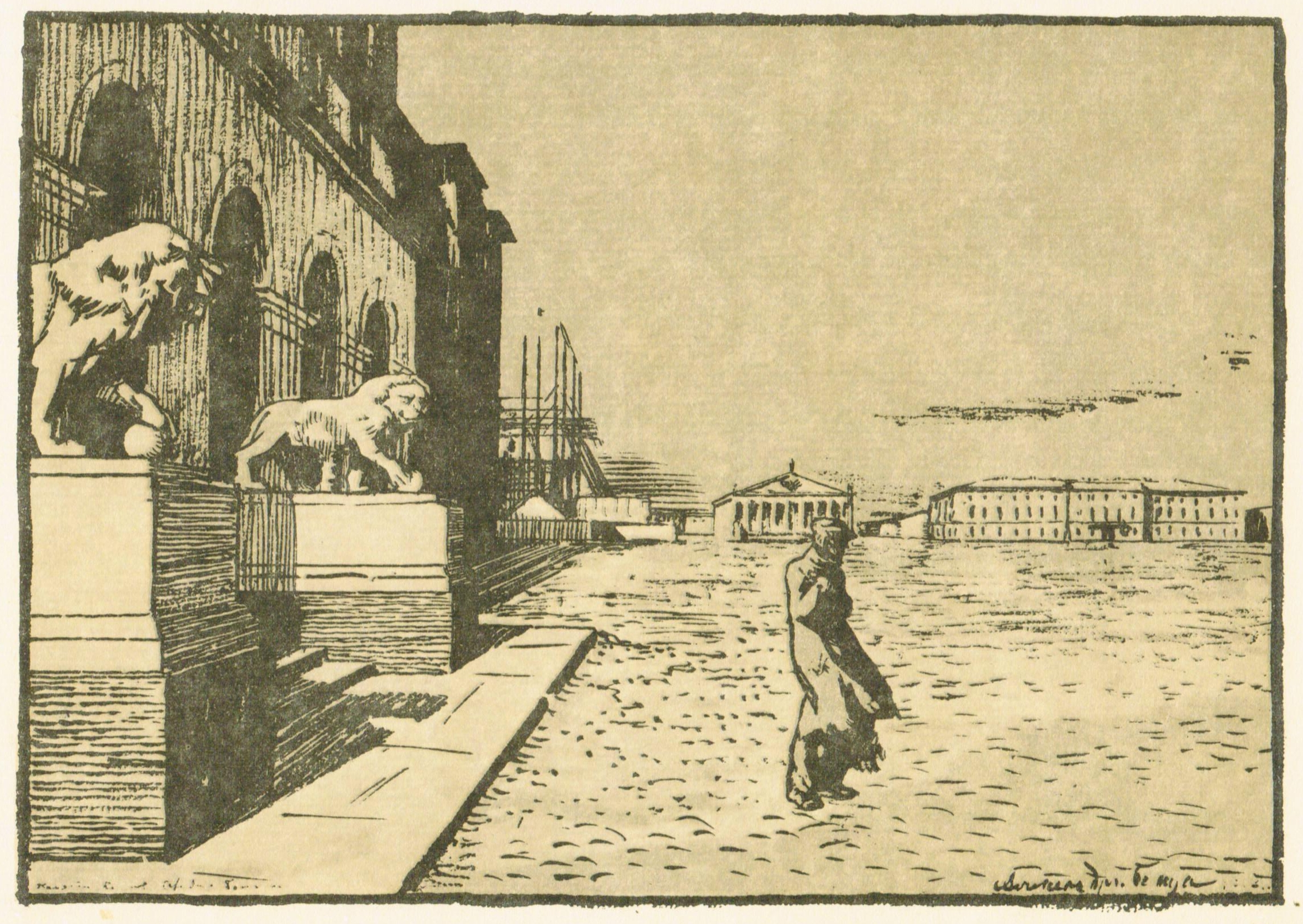
The palace's Medici lions, illustrated by Alexandre Benois around 1900.

The Neoclassical or Empire style building is an early work of the architect Auguste de Montferrand. The triangular building faces Admiralty Garden, Voznesensky Avenue and Saint Isaac's Square.

The main entrance, on the Admiralteisky Avenue, has an eight-column portico facing the Admiralty building, and its porch is guarded by white marble Medici lions by sculptor Paolo Triscorni on granite pedestals. Triscorni's sculptures were made famous by Pushkin in his last long poem, The Bronze Horseman.

== History ==
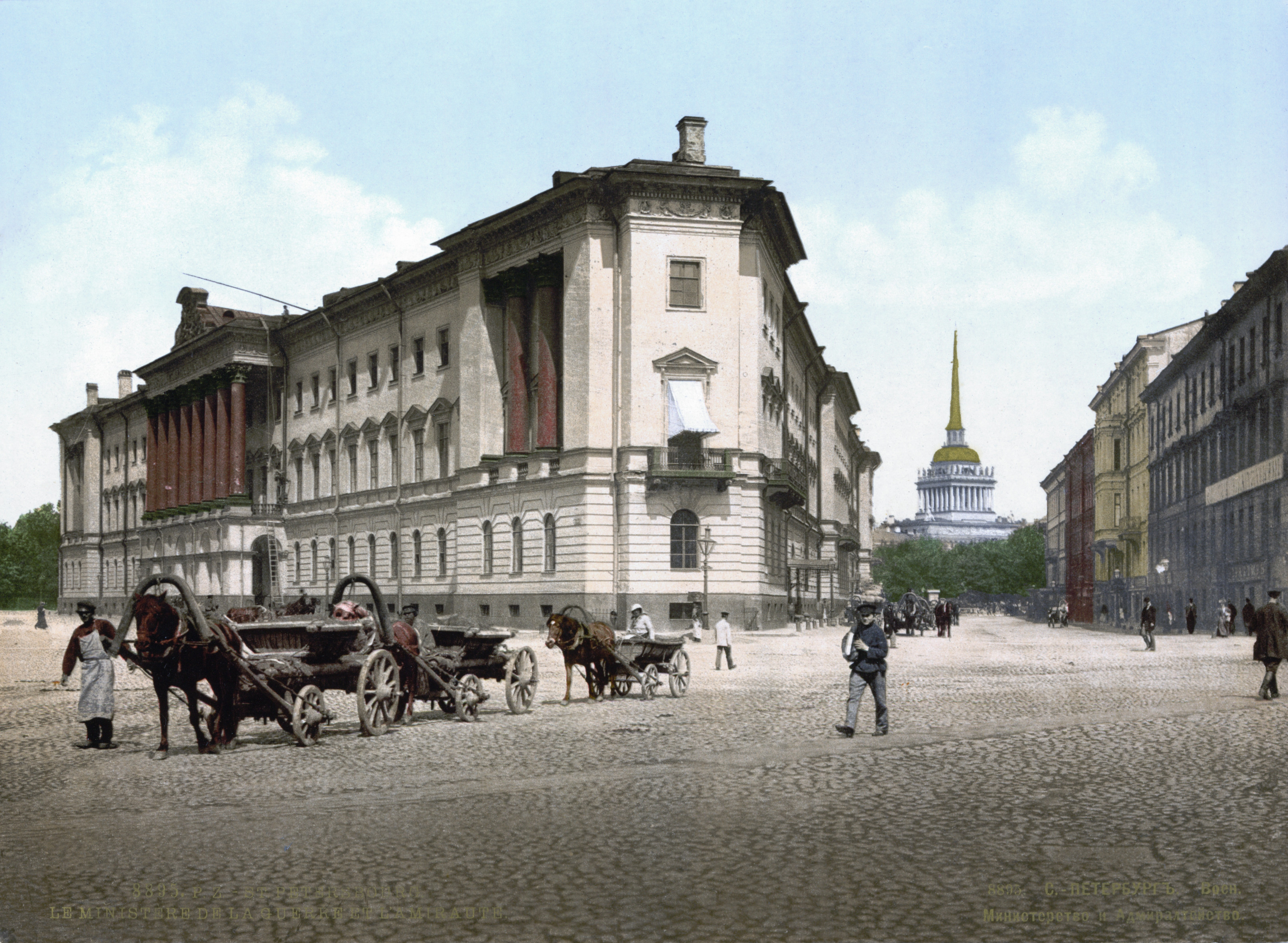
The Lobanov-Rostovsky Residence around 1890-1900

In 1824, the mezzanine and the first floor of the residence were rented for the Ministry of War of the Russian Empire for 63,000 roubles a year. On 23 June 1828, the entire building was bought by the State Treasury for one million roubles, and in 1829-1830 it was renovated to meet the Ministry's needs. It housed the principal establishments of the Ministry until its dissolution in 1918.

After October 1917, there was a Military-Political Academy, aeronautical museum and dormitory located in the building. From 1946, Project Institute no. 1, the head organisation for designing industrial buildings and complexes, was located here.

In 2009, a project to renovate the building for the Four Seasons Hotels and Resorts chain started, which was originally scheduled to open in 2011, then postponed to early 2012 and later to mid-2013. The project was subsequently completed, and the hotel began operating as the Four Seasons Hotel Lion Palace.

Four Seasons Hotels ceased managing the hotel in 2022, due to economic sanctions imposed after the Russian invasion of Ukraine. The hotel continues to use the name, even though it is no longer part of the international chain.
