= Chorley and South Ribble Hospital =

- Lancashire Teaching Hospitals NHS Foundation Trust
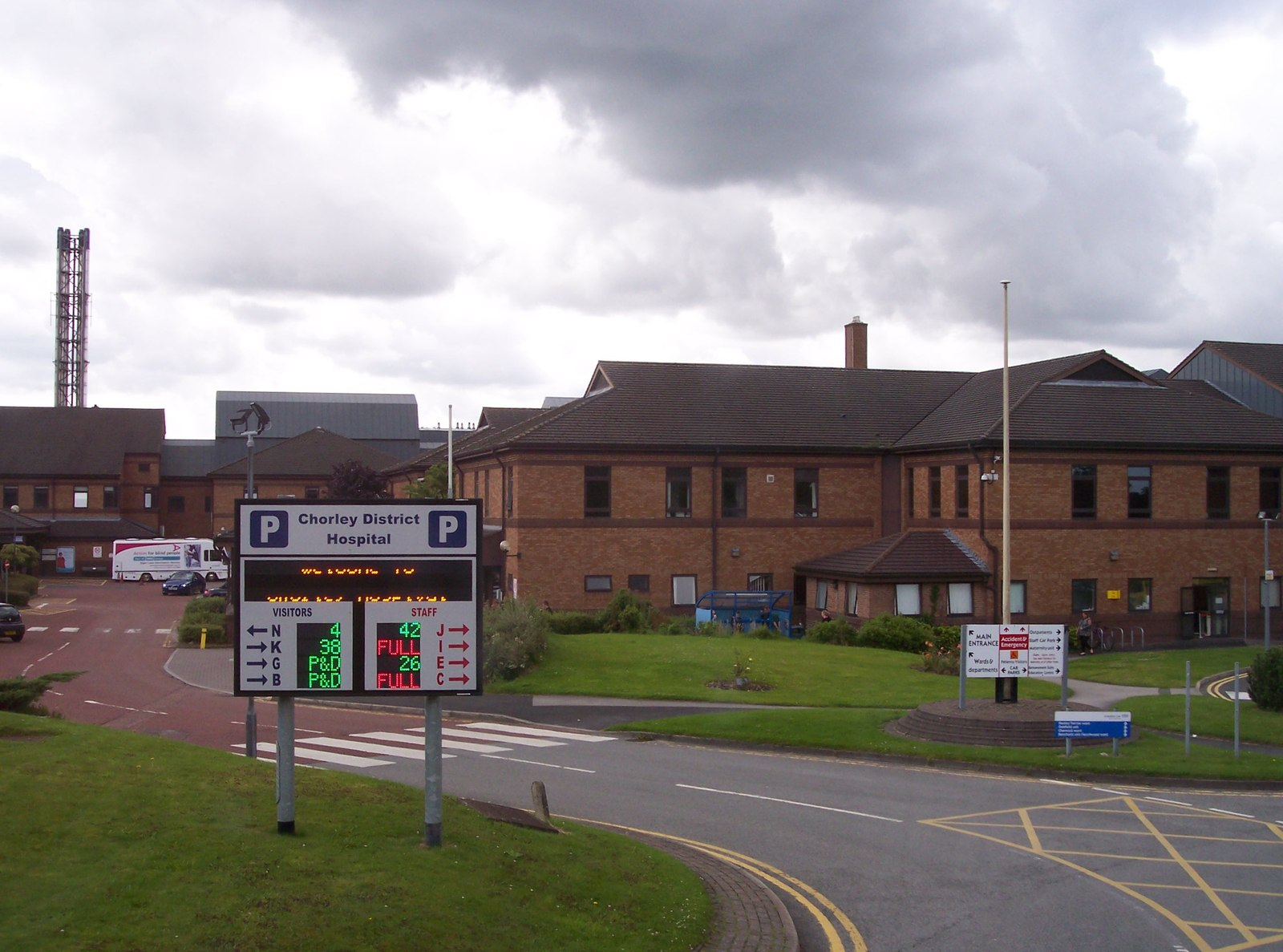
- Chorley and South Ribble Hospital

- Location in Chorley Borough

Geography
- Location: Chorley, Lancashire, England, United Kingdom
- Coordinates: 53.666°N 2.635°W

Organisation
- Care system: NHS
- Type: District General
- Affiliated university: University of Central Lancashire; University of Cumbria; University of Manchester; University of St Andrews

Services
- Emergency department: Accident and Emergency (Open 8am to 8pm) and a 24 hour Urgent Care Centre.

History
- Founded: 1893

Links
- Lists: Hospitals in England

Chorley and South Ribble Hospital is an acute general hospital in Chorley. The hospital is situated on Euxton lane in Chorley close to junction 8 of the M61. It is managed by Lancashire Teaching Hospitals NHS Foundation Trust.

== History ==
The hospital has its origins in the Chorley Cottage Hospital which had been proposed by Alderman Henry Rawcliffe and which opened in September 1893. This became the Rawcliffe Hospital in 1900 and the Chorley Hospital in 1929.

A new hospital designed by Bradshaw, Gass and Hope was built in the early 1930s; it was opened as the Chorley and District General Hospital on 2 September 1933 and joined the National Health Service in 1948.

After services were transferred from Eaves Lane Hospital and from Heath Charnock Hospital in 1982, it became necessary to expand the facilities: the official opening of the new extension was performed by Princess Anne on 28 April 1997.

In June 2016, after the accident and emergency department was closed because of staffing issues, protesters sought the immediate restoration of the facility. In October 2020 the trust agreed to reopen the department and this was condemned by 17 emergency medicine consultants as unsafe while "Lancashire is in the midst of a surge in covid-19 cases, filling both inpatients and critical care beds." In February 2021 Matt Hancock issued instructions that plans to close the accident and emergency department should not proceed.

The maternity ward was demolished in 2020 and the site used for the new Cuerden Ward which provides additional capacity for diabetes, endocrinology and general medical patients and opened in 2022.

In November 2023 the hospital was inspected by the Care Quality Commission which graded the hospital as "Requires improvement" in two out of five categories. Lancashire Teaching Hospitals NHS Foundation Trust responded to the report stating that the COVID-19 backlog was responsible for a number of their ratings falling below the previous levels.

== See also ==
- List of hospitals in England
