= James Hibbert =

English architect (1831–1903)

James Hibbert (1831 – 19 November 1903) was an English architect who practised in Preston, Lancashire.

== Life and work ==
Hibbert was born in Preston and educated at Preston Grammar School. From 1855 Hibbert worked in partnership with Nathan Rainford. From October 1871 he was a councillor for the Christ Church ward in Preston, soon after he also became an alderman of Preston. He was elected mayor of Preston in 1880. He resigned from the council in 1898 Hibbert's finest and most important work is the Harris Museum (1882–93), which is described by Hartwell and Pevsner in the Buildings of England series as "one of the largest, most imposing and memorable public buildings in north Lancashire". It is recorded in the National Heritage List for England as a designated Grade I listed building. (Note: Grade I is the most important of the three grades of listing designated by English Heritage, and is applied to buildings that are of exceptional interest, sometimes considered to be internationally important".) He also designed Fishergate Baptist Church (1858) (with Rainford), and Preston Savings Bank (1872), also Treales Primary school (1872), also in Fishergate. Other works include an extension to Preston Royal Infirmary (1866–70), and the partial rebuilding of North Road Pentecostal Church in Preston (1885–86). Following his retirement he moved to a house he built in Anerley, London, where he died on 19 November 1903

== Notes and references ==
Notes

Citations

Sources

- Hartwell, Clare; Pevsner, Nikolaus (2009) [1969], Lancashire: North, The Buildings of England, New Haven and London: Yale University Press, ISBN 978-0-300-12667-9
