= Lancashire Teaching Hospitals NHS Foundation Trust =

NHS Foundation Trust

- Merger of: Chorley and South Ribble NHS Trust and Preston Acute Hospitals NHS Trust
- Headquarters: Royal Preston Hospital
- Chief Executive: Silas Nicholls 8 Jan 2024 -
- Website: https://lancsteachinghospitals.nhs.uk

Lancashire Teaching Hospitals NHS Foundation Trust is one of the United Kingdom's NHS Foundation Trusts. It provides healthcare for people in the Preston area and surrounding area in northwest England. The trust runs Royal Preston Hospital on the northern outskirts of the city in the Fulwood area and Chorley and South Ribble Hospital.

== Trust ==
Besides being a major healthcare services provider to over 350,000 people the Foundation Trust also provides clinical education for Trust Staff and external delegates under the brand of "The Health Academy" in addition to teaching for medical students from the University of Manchester and University of St Andrews. Both Chorley and Preston Hospitals also provide training for student nurses from the University of Lancashire. In January 2015, the Trust started an arrangement to train 50 nurses a year at the University of Bolton who will be guaranteed jobs at the Trust. Their studies will be funded by Student loans.

The Trust is also involved in the education and training of Diagnostic Radiography undergraduates, from the University of Cumbria.

The Trust uses the Single Transferable Vote voting system to elect its Members' Council.

== Performance ==
The trust expects to finish 2015-16 with a deficit of more than £45 million as a result of changes to the NHS tariff.

In March 2018 it was the third worst performer in England in A&E, with only 53.3% of patients seen within 4 hours. In December 2019 it was the worst performing trust in England, with only 43.4% seen within 4 hours.

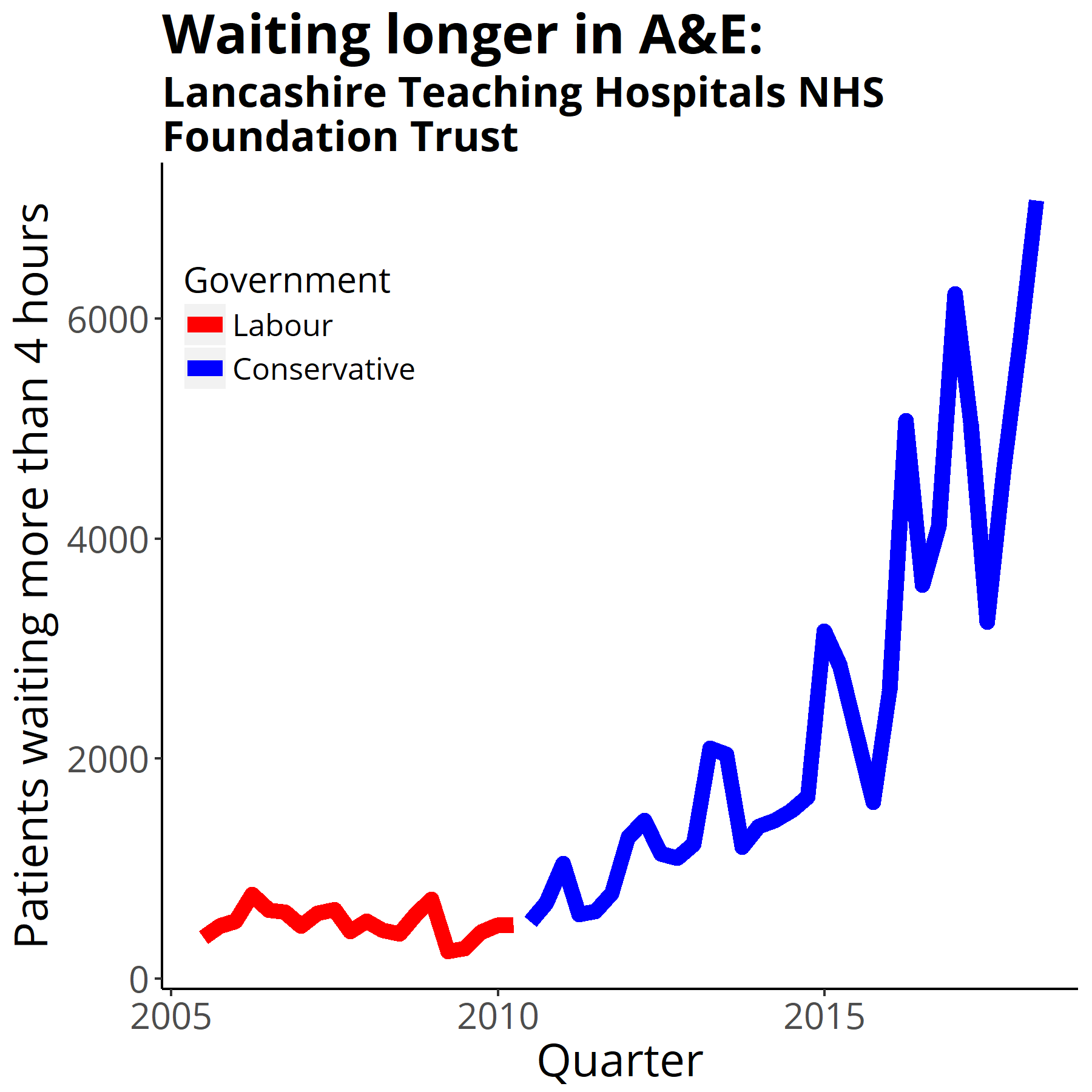
Four-hour target in the emergency department quarterly figures from NHS England Data from https://www.england.nhs.uk/statistics/statistical-work-areas/ae-waiting-times-and-activity/

Nursing staff at Chorley and South Ribble Hospital A&E department complained of having to work shifts of up to 17 hours and threatened to start finishing their shifts on schedule if the situation is not resolved. A&E consultants at Royal Preston Hospital wrote to the Board raised concerns over unsafe staffing and dangerous levels of overcrowding in the A&E department. The operations director and three divisional directors resigned in April 2018. From January to March 2019 only 52% of patients in the two emergency departments were seen within 4 hours. This was the worst performance in England. There were about 200 "trolley waits" where patients waited more than 12 hours to be admitted to a ward.

The trust consider themselves to be the leading provider of prostatectomies within the region, but the East Lancashire Hospitals NHS Trust challenged this in June 2015 by installing a da Vinci Surgical System at the Royal Blackburn Hospital.

In March 2022 it was reported that patients were routinely waiting more than 60 hours to be admitted to a ward from the accident and emergency department.

== Chorley and South Ribble Hospital ==
In March 2016 the trust decided to downgrade the Emergency Department in Chorley to the status of an urgent care centre, open from 8am to 8pm with an out of hours GP service overnight, because they were unable to attract sufficient medical staff. An ambulance will be stationed in Chorley so that patients can be rapidly transported to Preston. This is said to be a temporary move. In January 2017 the trust reinstated the ED at Chorley on a part-time 12 hour basis with the UCC operating 24/7 run by GTD healthcare.

== New Preston Hospital ==
In July 2021, the trust's New Hospitals Programme published a report explaining the need for new hospital facilities. In September 2021, the trust outlined the possibility of a New Preston Hospital in a progress post on their website, and throughout 2022 the programme began searching for locations to house a possible new facility.

In May 2023, it was announced that a new hospital intended to replace Royal Preston will be built in 2030. The new hospital facility will be on a different site to the existing location. As of December 2023 the trust is still selecting a site, all shortlisted locations are in South Ribble. The new hospital is being built in response to the trust's chief executive claiming many parts of the existing hospital are "not fit for purpose".

The decision to locate the new hospital in South Ribble has been criticised by some local politicians including Preston City Council Leader Matthew Brown who said that "out of the three authorities, Preston has higher levels of ill health"

== See also ==
- List of hospitals in England
- List of NHS trusts
