= Fishergate Baptist Church =

Redundant Baptist church in Lancashire, England

Coordinates: 53.7577°N 2.7051°W

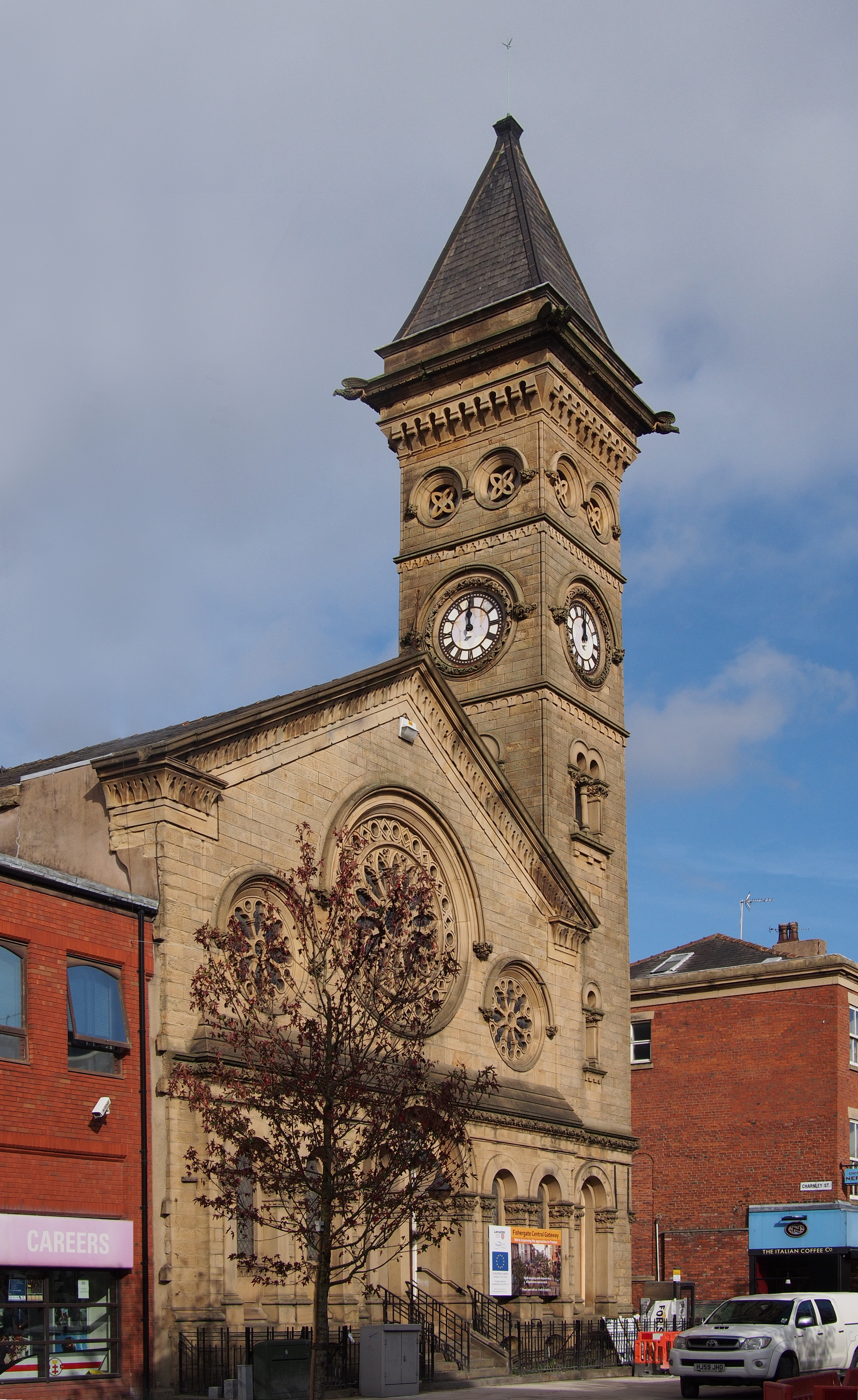
- Fishergate Baptist Church front three-quarter view

- Location in Preston
- OS grid reference: SD 536 293
- Location: Fishergate, Preston, Lancashire
- Country: England
- Denomination: Baptist

Architecture
- Functional status: Redundant
- Heritage designation: Grade II
- Designated: 29 January 1986
- Architect(s): James Hibbert and Nathan Rainford
- Architectural type: Church
- Groundbreaking: 1857
- Completed: 1858

Specifications
- Materials: Sandstone, slate roof

Fishergate Baptist Church in Fishergate, Preston, Lancashire, England was an active Baptist church for more than 150 years, but is now redundant. The church is recorded in the National Heritage List for England as a designated Grade II listed building. Since 2018 it has housed a French-themed bistro.

== History ==
The church was built in 1857–58 to a design by James Hibbert and Nathan Rainford. It was for many years an active church, but has been redundant since 2011, when it was advertised for sale, at a price of £500,000. The Reverend Phil Jump said the church basement had housed a number of volunteer groups which would be impacted by its closure. These included groups which supported the homeless in Preston.

The church was later altered, by David Cox Architects Ltd of Preston, in a scheme shortlisted for an International Restaurant Design Award. In August 2018 it saw the opening of French-gastro chain Bistro Pierre, making it one of the largest restaurants in the city.

== Architecture ==
=== Exterior ===
Fishergate Baptist Church is built in sandstone with slate roofs, and is in Italian Romanesque style. It has a rectangular plan, is in two storeys with a basement, and has a symmetrical entrance front facing the street. Eight steps lead up to a double doorway, each door having an arch in Mozarabic style, and both contained in a round-headed arch. Flanking the doorway are two round-arched windows on each side. The doorways and windows have pilasters with carved imposts, and above them is a cornice. The upper part of the entrance front contains corner pilasters and a pediment, the pediment containing a large wheel window and two smaller ones, all with hood moulds. The rear of the church is gabled; the gable also contains a large wheel window, and two two-light mullioned windows. Along the sides of the church are gabled projections, each containing a pair of windows. At the southeast corner of the church is a tower. In the ground floor of the tower is a round-arched doorway, in the first stage is a single lancet window, and in the second stage are pairs of lancets; all of these are in Mozarabic style. On each side of the third stage there is a clock face with a pair of oculi above, all with hood moulds. Over these is a cornice with carvings of birds projecting from the corners, and a tall pyramidal roof.

=== Interior ===
Steeply pointed arcades inside the church are carried on square piers. Doors at the far end of the building are flanked by foliated shafts, and a gallery with cast iron balusters. The church also contains monuments to members of the Sellrers family, dating from the late 19th century. The two-manual pipe organ was made by Henry Ainscough of Preston in 1870, and repaired by the same company in 1954; its case is decorated with putti.

== Appraisal ==
The church was designated a Grade II listed building on 29 January 1986, the lowest of its three grades of listing that is applied to buildings that are "nationally important and of special interest". Hartwell and Pevsner in the Buildings of England series comment that the tower is "rather starved".

== See also ==
- Listed buildings in Preston, Lancashire
