= Royal Preston Hospital =

- Lancashire Teaching Hospitals NHS Foundation Trust
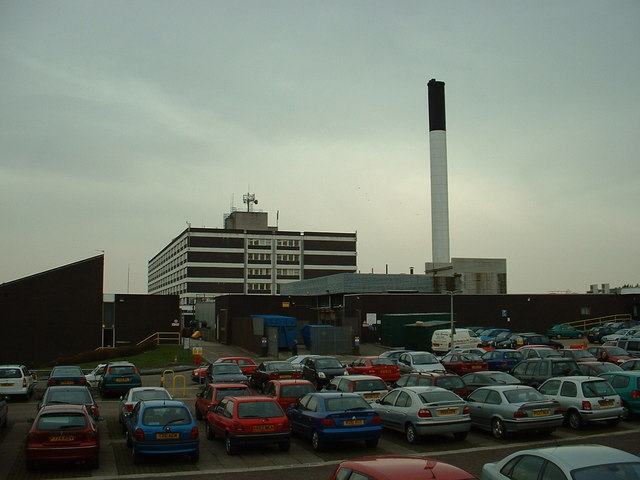
- Royal Preston Hospital

- Shown in Preston

Geography
- Location: Fulwood, Preston, England, United Kingdom
- Coordinates: 53.792°N 2.706°W

Organisation
- Care system: Public NHS
- Type: Teaching Hospital
- Affiliated university: University of Central Lancashire; University of Manchester; University of St Andrews; University of Cumbria

Services
- Emergency department: Major Trauma Centre

History
- Founded: 1983

Links
- Website: www.lancsteachinghospitals.nhs.uk
- Lists: Hospitals in England

The Royal Preston Hospital or RPH, is an acute general hospital in Preston, Lancashire, England. It is managed by the Lancashire Teaching Hospitals NHS Foundation Trust.

== History ==
=== 1975–2000 ===
The hospital was built in stages between 1975 and 1983; it was officially opened by the Princess of Wales on 1 June 1983.

Further expansion took place to accommodate services transferred from the Preston Royal Infirmary, which closed in 1990, and the Sharoe Green Hospital which closed in 1992. A new children's unit was added in 1994 and a dedicated day case surgery unit was completed in 1996.

=== 2000–present ===
On 9 August 2016, the 6th Duke of Westminster died in Royal Preston Hospital after suffering a heart attack at his Abbeystead estate.

In June 2023 the hospital received the UK's first lung cancer imager.

In November 2023 the hospital was inspected by the Care Quality Commission which graded the hospital as "Requires improvement" in three out of five categories. Lancashire Teaching Hospitals NHS Foundation Trust responded to the report stating that the COVID-19 backlog was responsible for a number of their ratings falling below the previous levels.

A new extension to the hospital was also announced in the same month, to provide additional services for Day-of-Surgery Admissions patients.

== New Preston Hospital ==
In May 2023, it was announced that a new hospital intended to replace Royal Preston will be built in 2030. The new hospital facility will be on a different site to the existing location.

The decision to locate the new hospital in South Ribble has been criticised by some local politicians including Preston City Council Leader Matthew Brown who said that "out of the three authorities, Preston has higher levels of ill health"
