= Auguste de Montferrand =

French architect (1786–1858)

- Огюст Монферран
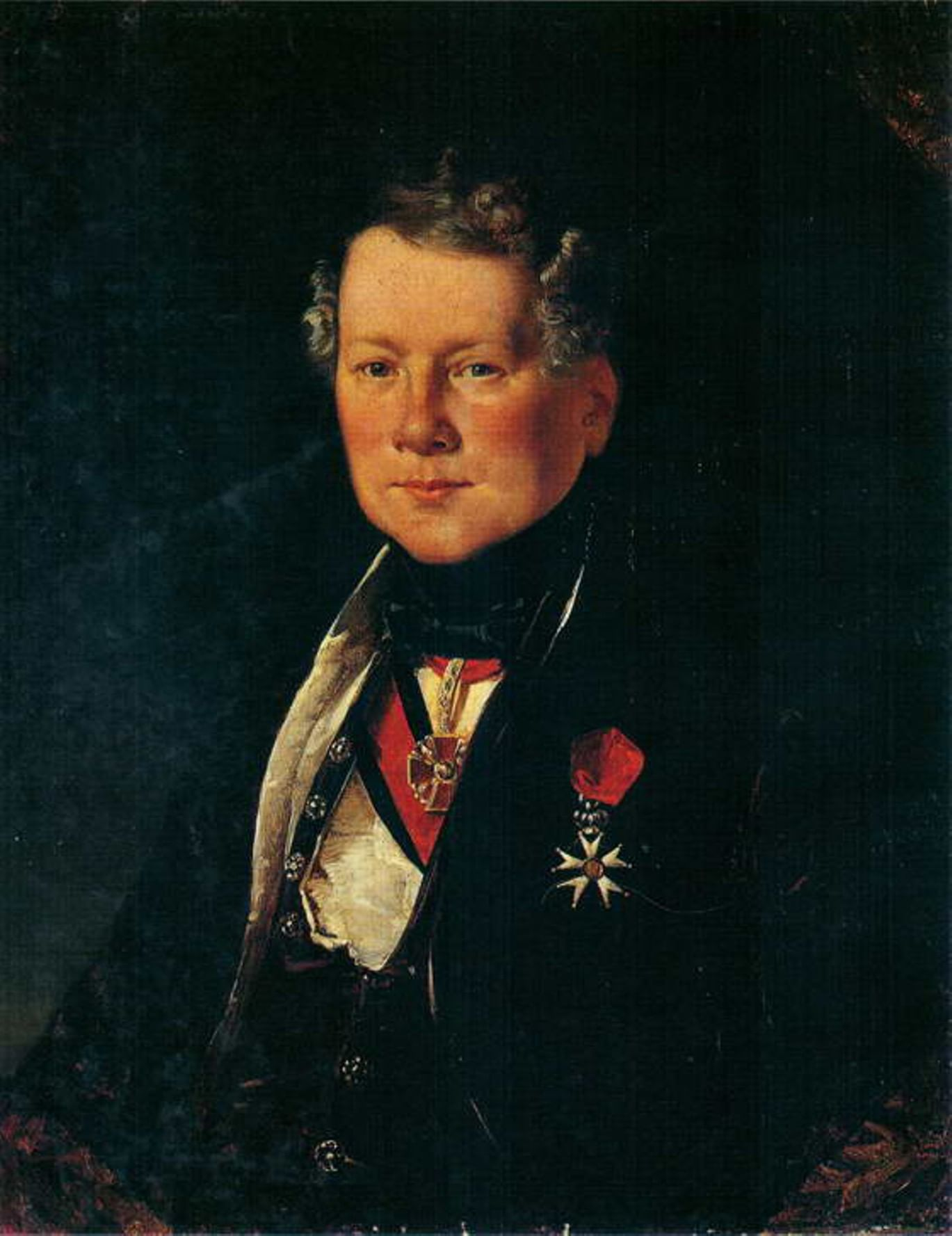
- Portrait by Eugène Pluchart, after 1834
- Born: Henri Louis Auguste Léger Ricard; January 23, 1786; Chaillot, France
- Died: July 10, 1858 (aged 72); Saint Petersburg, Russia
- Education: Académie d'architecture
- Occupation: Architect
- Spouse(s): First wife, dates unknown Elise Debonniere (m. 1835–1858)
- Awards: Légion d'honneur
- Buildings: Saint Isaac's Cathedral; Alexander Column; Monument to Nicholas I
- Projects: Nizhny Novgorod Fair

Auguste de Montferrand (French: [ogyst də mɔ̃fɛʁɑ̃]; Russian: Огюст Монферран, romanized: Ogyust Monferran; January 23, 1786 – July 10, 1858) was a French classicist architect who worked primarily in Russia. His two best known works are the Saint Isaac's Cathedral and the Alexander Column in Saint Petersburg.

== Early life ==
=== Family ===
Montferrand was born in the parish of Chaillot, France (now the 16th arrondissement of Paris). He was styled at birth Henri Louis Auguste Leger Ricard de Montferrand; the aristocratic de was probably his parents' invention. Decades later, Montferrand admitted in his will that, although his father owned Montferrand estate (his family was from the town of Montferrand), the title is disputable "and if there is any doubt, I can accept other names, first of all Ricard, after my father". Montferrand's father, Benois Ricard, was a horse trainer who died when Montferrand was a child; his grandfather, Leger Ricard, was a bridge engineer. Montferrand's mother, Marie Francoise Louise Fistioni, remarried to Antoine de Commarieux, who is credited with educating Montferrand.

=== Education and war ===
In 1806, Montferrand joined the former Académie d'architecture, joining the class of Charles Percier and Pierre Fontaine. Soon he was summoned to Napoleon's French Imperial Army, and served a brief tour of duty in Italy.

Montferrand married Julia Mornais in 1812. The next year, he was again drafted into the army when Allied troops were approaching Dresden. Montferrand served with distinction in Thuringia, and was awarded the Légion d'honneur for valor in the Battle of Hanau. (Note: He earned subsequent Legion awards in 1830 (Chevalier) and 1842 (Officier))

=== Career beginnings ===
When hostilities ended, new construction in defeated France was out of the question. Montferrand worked on a few unimportant jobs, spending three years performing basic draftsmanship and seeking opportunities overseas. In 1815, he was granted an audience with Alexander I of Russia, and presented the Tsar with an album of his works.

In the summer of 1816, Montferrand landed in St. Petersburg, carrying a recommendation letter from Abraham-Louis Breguet. He rented a room near the house of Fyodor Wigel, the secretary of the Construction Commission, and applied to Agustín de Betancourt, the chairman of the commission (and a partner of Breguet's in the 1790s). Betancourt, impressed by Breguet's letter and Montferrand's drawings, offered Montferrand the desk of Head of Draftsmen, but Montferrand preferred the lower rank of senior draftsman. On December 21, 1816, he officially joined the Russian service.

== Work ==
Montferrand's name is associated with St. Petersburg. However, working with Betancourt, he also designed buildings in Moscow, Odessa, and Nizhny Novgorod. His first major project, the Odessa Lycaeum, did not materialize due to financing problems. His designs for the Moscow Manege (1825) and Moscow fountains (1823) were also abandoned; these projects were completed by Joseph Bové and Ivan Vitali.

=== Nizhny Novgorod Fair (1817–1825) ===
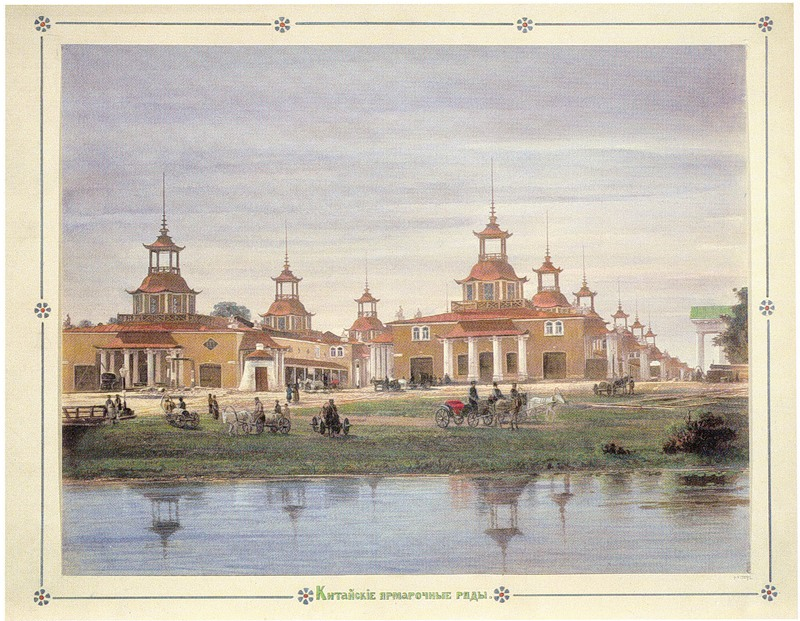
Chinese pavilions, Nizhny Novgorod Fair

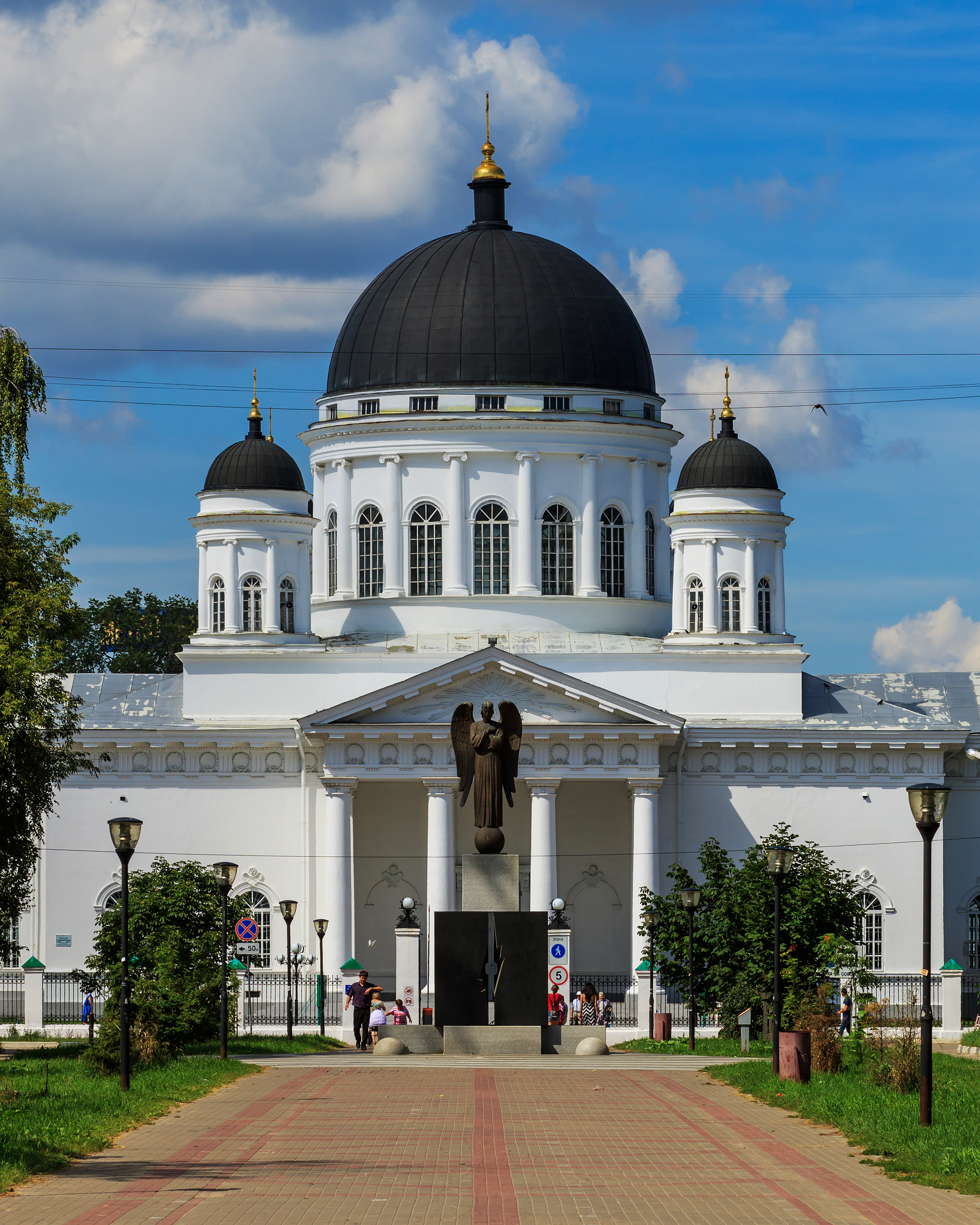
Saviour (Old Fair) Cathedral, Nizhny Novgorod

In 1816, an accidental fire destroyed the Makaryev Fair. The fairgrounds were transferred to Nizhny Novgorod, equipped with temporary wooden trade rows. Betancourt visited the site in 1817 and proposed a six-million-rouble, four-year project to rebuild the Fair using stone. Alexander I approved it, at the expense of halting the reconstruction of the Winter Palace

Montferrand, as chief architect, reported to Betancourt, who personally managed the project. Montferrand started with the two-story main administration building. This traditional, neoclassical design was marked by custom column capitals with a caduceus motif. The fair itself consisted of eight two-story corner blocks and 48 standard trade row buildings. (Note: See plan of the fairground.) The fairground terminated in a row of four "Chinese" pavilions, each with pagoda roofs; the neoclassical Saviour's Cathedral, and was encircled with a wide "Betancourt's Canal"—a precaution against fire.

Despite shortages in manpower and material, the Fair opened in July 1822. Rectification work proceeded to 1825 and consumed a further 3.5 million roubles. The Fair operated until 1930; most of its buildings were torn down during the Soviet era, but the Saviour's Cathedral survives.

=== St. Isaac's Cathedral (1816–1858) ===
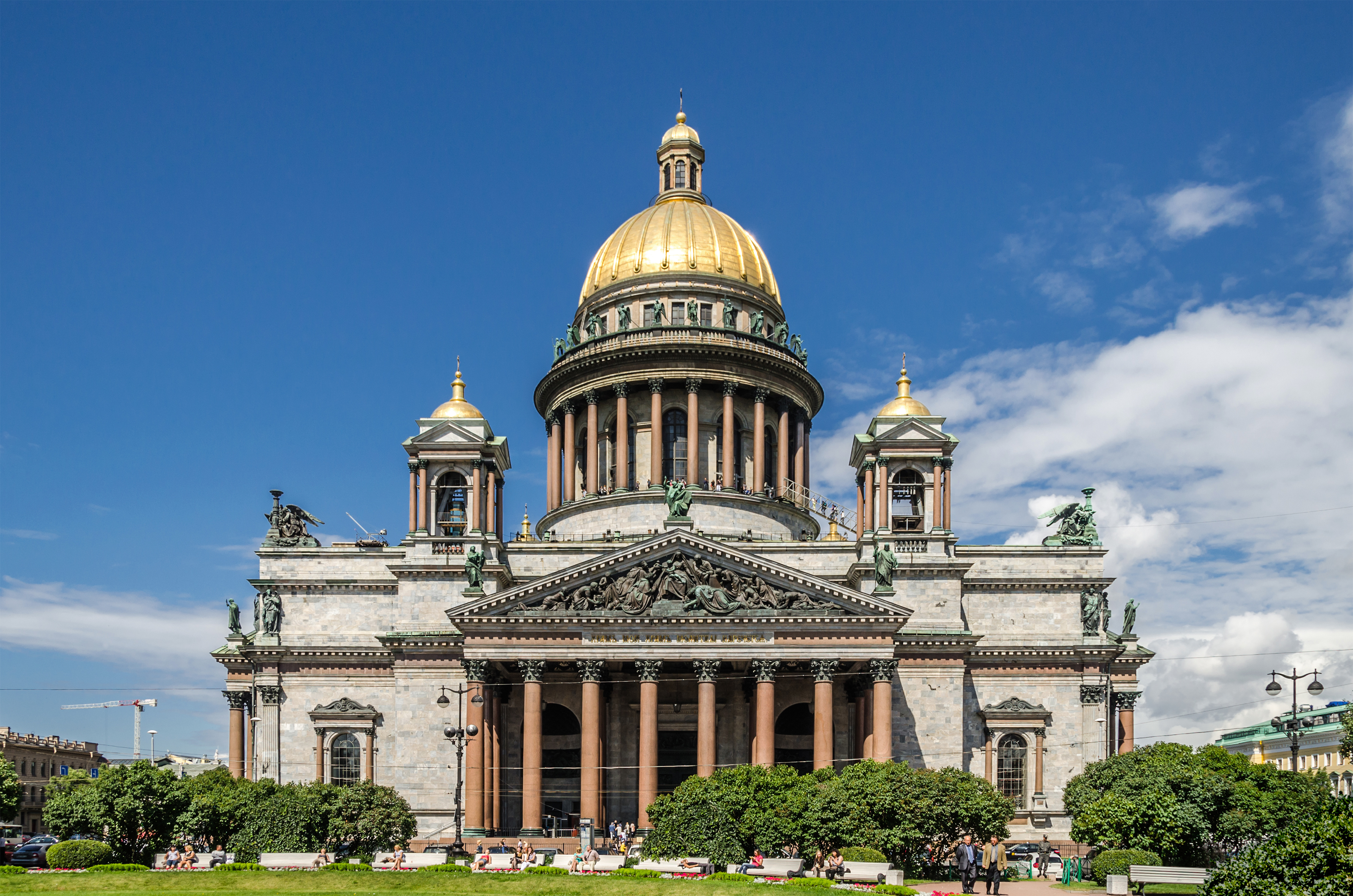
St.Isaac's

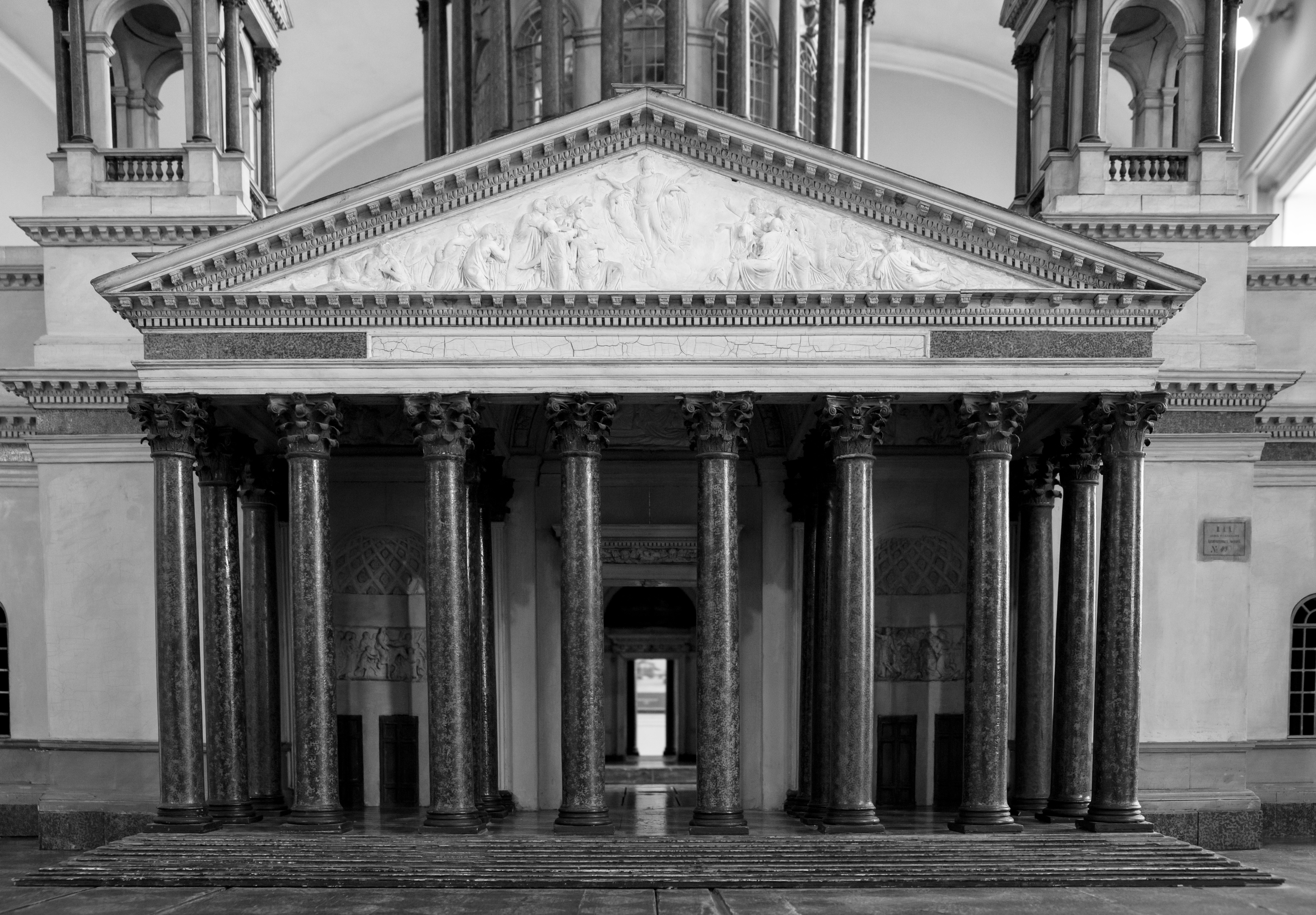
Design model of the Saint Isaac's Cathedral, 1818–1821, designed by Montferrand, wood, plaster, metal, oil paint, gilding, collection of St. Petersburg Academy of Arts

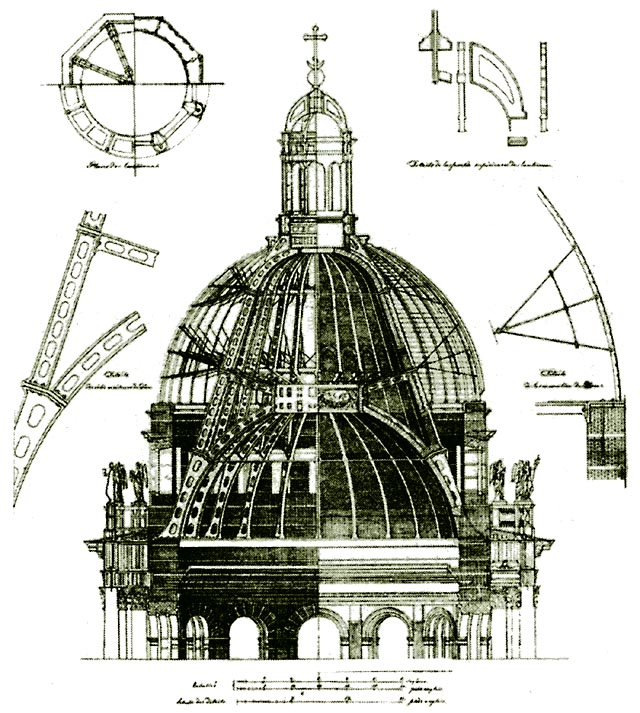
Dome structure, 1838

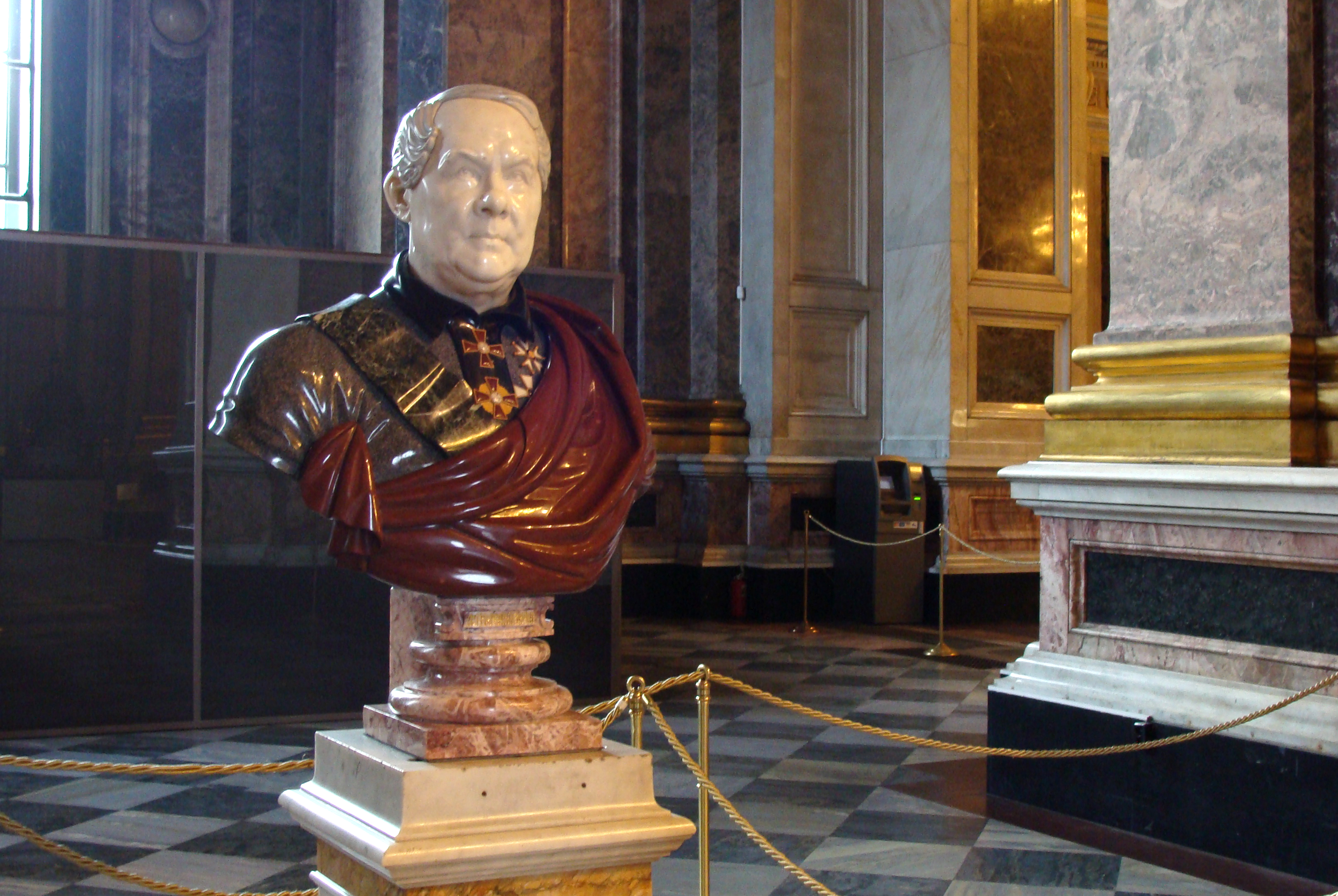
The bust of de Montferrand inside St. Isaac's Cathedral, 2013

The previous St. Isaac's, laid down by Antonio Rinaldi in 1768, was partially completed in 1802 by Vincenzo Brenna. In 1816, Alexander I assigned Betancourt to find the architect who could rebuild the cathedral; Betancourt pointed at Montferrand. Four original concepts, using as much of the old structure as possible, failed; the fifth was approved in February 1818. Rivalry between court architects temporarily halted the project between 1821 and 1825.

Montferrand's first decision was to use a slab foundation, rather than a perimeter of piles. The foundation work took five years. It took more than a decade to obtain the 48 granite columns for the main portico. Columns were roughly cut in Fredrikshamn, delivered by barge, and finished on site one by one, using a gigantic lathe of Montferrand's own design. The columns were raised in 1828–1830; polishing took four more years. In the same time, bricklayers completed the main walls and vaulted ceilings.

Montferrand was nearly killed in November 1837, when the crews were lifting 64-ton dome columns to their full 168-foot (51 m) height. (Note: 24 sazhen = 168 ft.) Montferrand fell from the scaffolds, but nearby workers managed to catch him.

The design of St. Isaac's domes was novel. Prior to St. Isaac's, steel-frame exterior domes were coupled to masonry internal domes. Montferrand proposed an all-metal triple-dome system, where the middle conical dome carried the lightweight interior and exterior frames. This reduced dome weight from an estimated 7,440 metric tons (1,172,000 st) to 2,680 metric tons (422,000 st); (Note: 1838 design.) a further 600 metric tons (94,000 st) was saved in the construction process. The dome, completed in 1841, cost two million roubles less than originally estimated.

Decorating the cathedral's interior took another 16 years. Montferrand managed artists such as Karl Briullov and his brothers, Peter Clodt, and Ivan Vitali, all under close inspection by the State and Academy bureaucracies. The cathedral opened on May 30, 1858—the 186th anniversary of Peter the Great's birth.

=== Alexander Column (1829–1834) ===
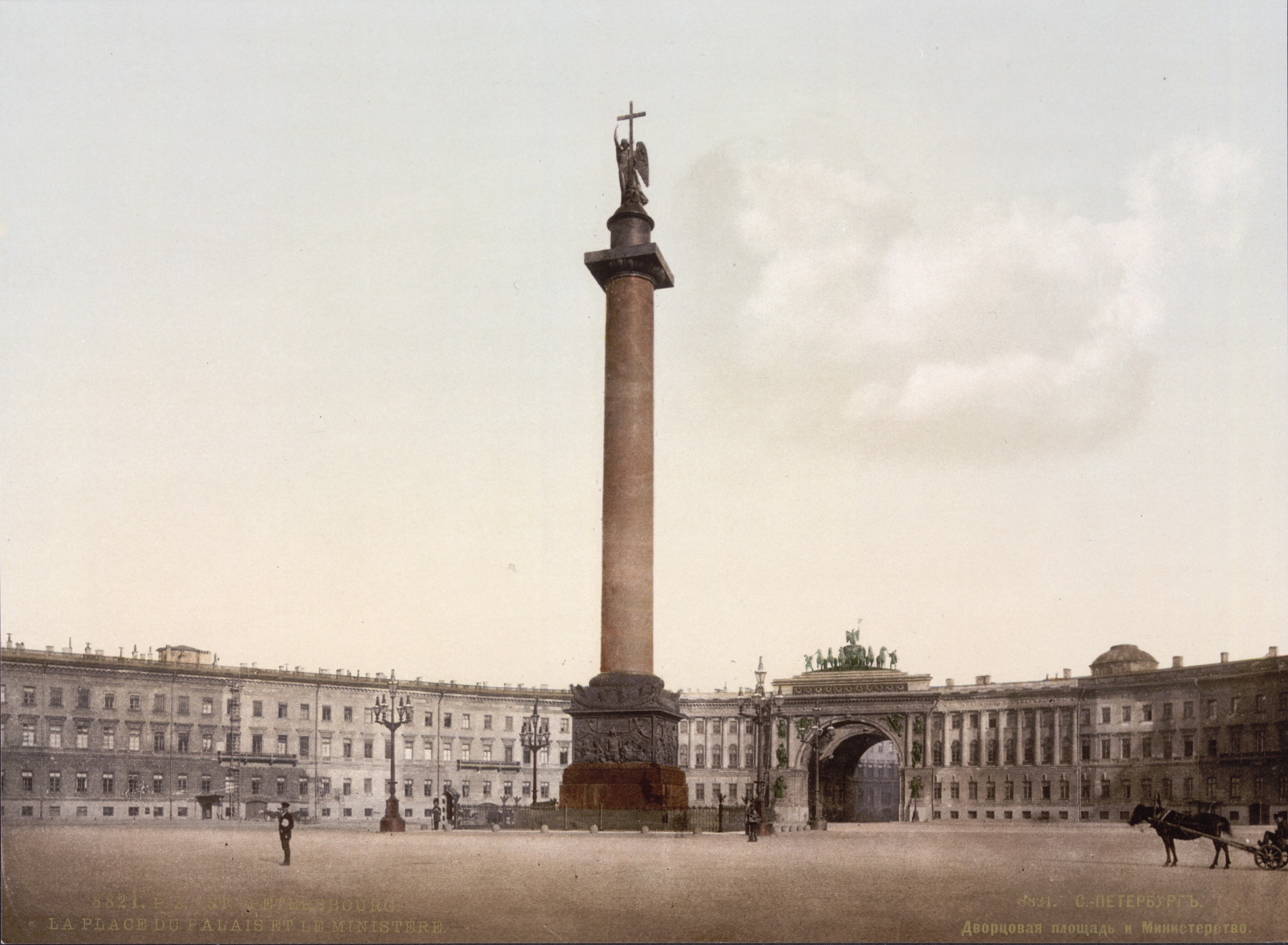
Alexander's Column

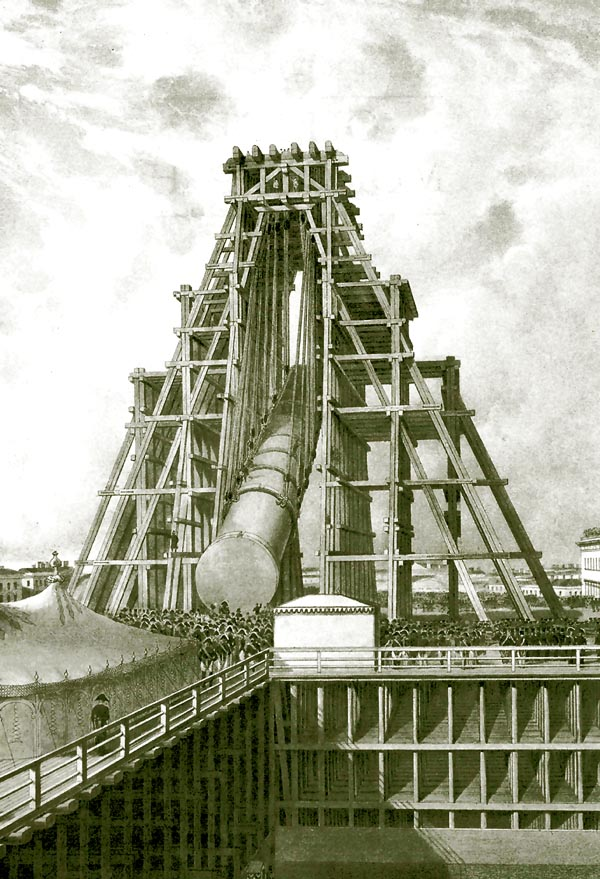
Raising the column, 1832

Montferrand designed the monument to the late Alexander I as a column, crowned with a cross; later, he changed the cross to an angel. The cost was estimated at 1.2 million roubles. The 600-metric-ton (94,000 st) column had to be carved out of Finnish rocks in Virolahti, more than 100 nautical miles (190 km) from St. Petersburg, and transported by barge. Critics predicted that the column would fall apart upon separation from the rock, but Montferrand's experience with the columns of St. Isaac's persuaded Nicholas I, who approved the project in December 1829.

Montferrand selected the quarry contractor in March 1830, in a bidding war that reduced the column price from 420 thousand to 150 thousand roubles. Carving took a year and a half, and in September 1831 the column safely separated from the rock. By April 1832, the carvers completed shaping it and started blasting the path from the quarry to the loading bay. The barge loading nearly ended in a catastrophe. The column broke through the ramp and threatened to roll over the barge; a team of 300 workers managed to set it back in place.

At the same time, crews in St. Petersburg prepared the foundation and scaffolding; the cost estimate doubled to 2.36 million roubles. Montferrand summoned a total of 2,090 soldiers, officers, and professionals to erect the column, raising it safely on August 30, 1832. Precisely two years later, the monument was inaugurated by Nicholas. (Note: One year was lost for academic debate about the angel's statue; finally, Nicholas I intervened and decreed that the single angel must be six arshin (14 feet or 4.3 m) tall.)

In 1836–1837, Montferrand completed the Palace Square with fencing and gas lights. He prepared five different designs for the building terminating the eastern side of the square, but the Guards Corps building was awarded to Alexander Brullov.

=== Completion of Kazansky Cathedral and Square (1827–1837) ===
As the chief architect of St. Petersburg's largest construction site, Montferrand supervised a number of other architectural jobs for the State, notably repairs of Kazan Cathedral. The cathedral was built in 1801–1811 by Andrey Voronikhin with temporary fittings. By 1827, the plaster sculptures were falling apart, and a leaking roof threatened to destroy frescoes and floors. Nicholas assigned Montferrand to fix the roof, replace floors, and install permanent, durable sculptures and finishes. Montferrand also supervised new fresco paintings (The Four Evangelists). He lost the bid to design the new iconostasis to young Konstantin Thon.

Montferrand, as the cathedral's architect, landscaped the adjacent square and designed the monuments to Kutuzov and Barclay de Tolly. The statues were made by Boris Orlovsky, and the bases by Vasily Stasov.

=== Monument to Nicholas I (1856–1859) ===
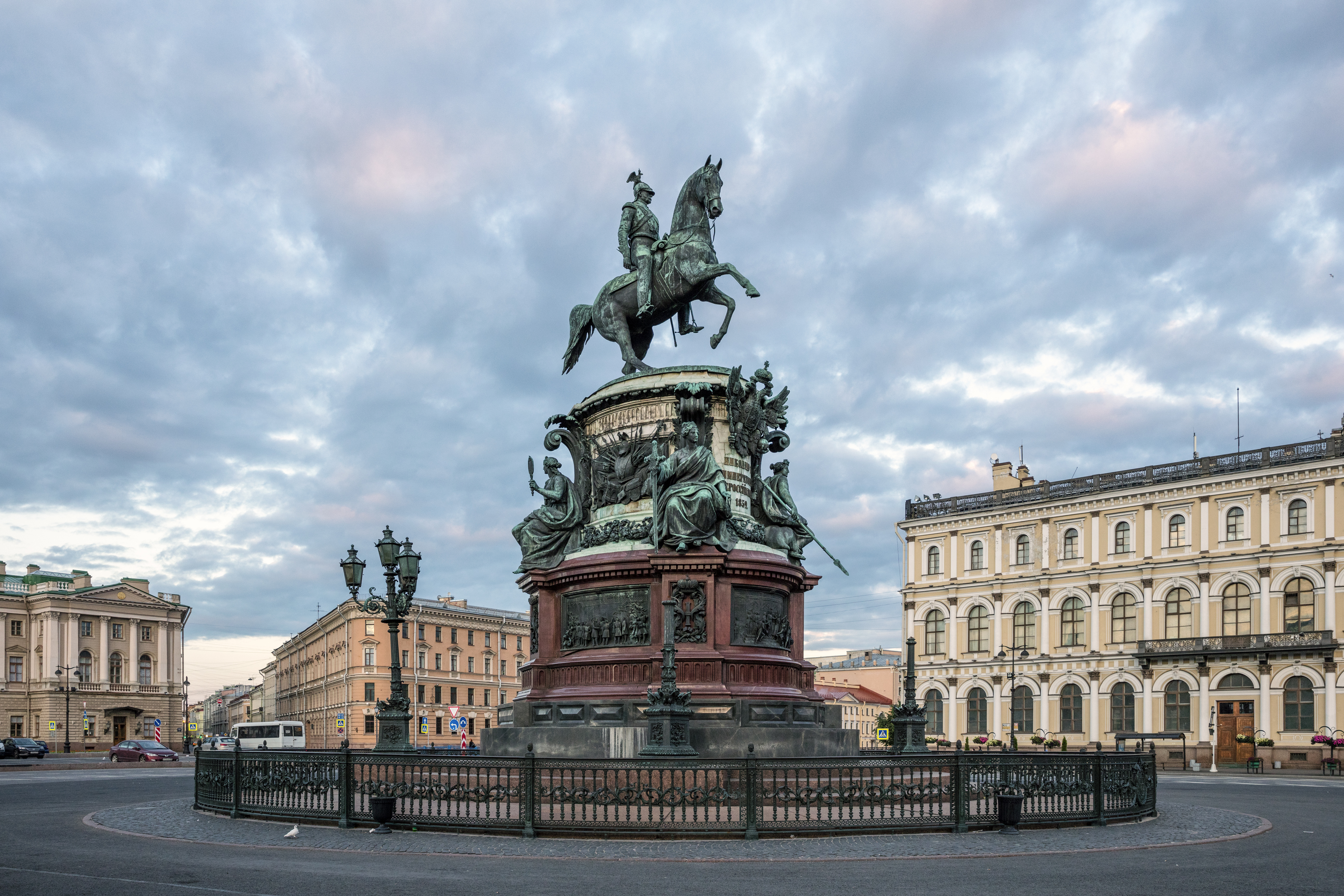
Montferrand's Monument to Nicholas I is one of the few equestrian statues in the world with merely two support points.

The Monument to Nicholas I was Montferrand's last work, commissioned by Alexander II in May 1856. The foundation and base was started with leftovers from the St. Isaac's site.

The contract for the equestrian statue was awarded to Peter Clodt. Clodt completed the model in the summer of 1857. The first bronze cast was lost when the mold cracked; a second statue was cast in February 1859—after Montferrand's death.

=== Other works ===
Other projects designed by Montferrand
Project	Location	Constructed	Notes
Lobanova-Rostovskaya Building	St. Petersburg	1817–1821	Later rebuilt.
Kochubei House	St. Petersburg	1818	Rebuilding and interiors.
House Church inside the Admiralty building		1821	
Catherinehof landscaping and park pavilions		1821–23	Demolished.
Count Litta House	St. Petersburg	1833	Demolished.
Personal house (later Demidov House)	St. Petersburg	1835	Demolished.
Demidov House (later Italian Embassy)	St. Petersburg	1836–1840	Interiors destroyed.
Personal house	St. Petersburg	1836–1846	Moika Embankment, 86.
Lerch House	St. Petersburg	1838	
Personal house	Aptekarsky Island, St. Petersburg	1840	
Winter Palace interiors		1827–1828 and later years	
Betancourt's tomb	Smolensloye cemetery, St. Petersburg	1824	
Louise Fistioni's tomb	Cimetière de Montmartre, Paris	1823	Fistioni was Montferrand's mother.

== Personal life ==
=== Art collection ===
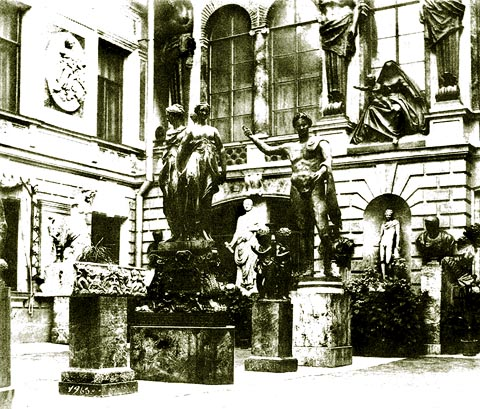
Montferrand's collection, inner courtyard of his own house, 1853 photograph. Madonna statue was a contemporary by Ivan Vitali

Monferrand divorced his first wife soon after settling in St. Petersburg. The divorce, and his extravagant lifestyle, led to considerable debt; in 1831, he refinanced his debt with a loan from the Tsar's Cabinet. In 1834, he was awarded a lifelong pension and a 100,000-rouble lump sum, enabling him to settle his accounts and build his own house. As his finances improved, Montferrand became a compulsive art collector, amassing 110 Greek and Roman statues and hundreds of lesser items. Witnesses reported that "any Sunday he indulged in rearranging the statues, using 25 laborers from 9 a.m. to lunch time". When Monferrand died, the Hermitage Museum failed to buy out the collection, and it was dispersed.

=== Second marriage ===
In 1835, Montferrand married Elise Debonniere, an actress who had arrived in St. Petersburg nine years earlier. The relationship began in the 1820s and lasted until his death. Montferrand adopted Henri, Elise's nephew.

=== Death and legacy ===
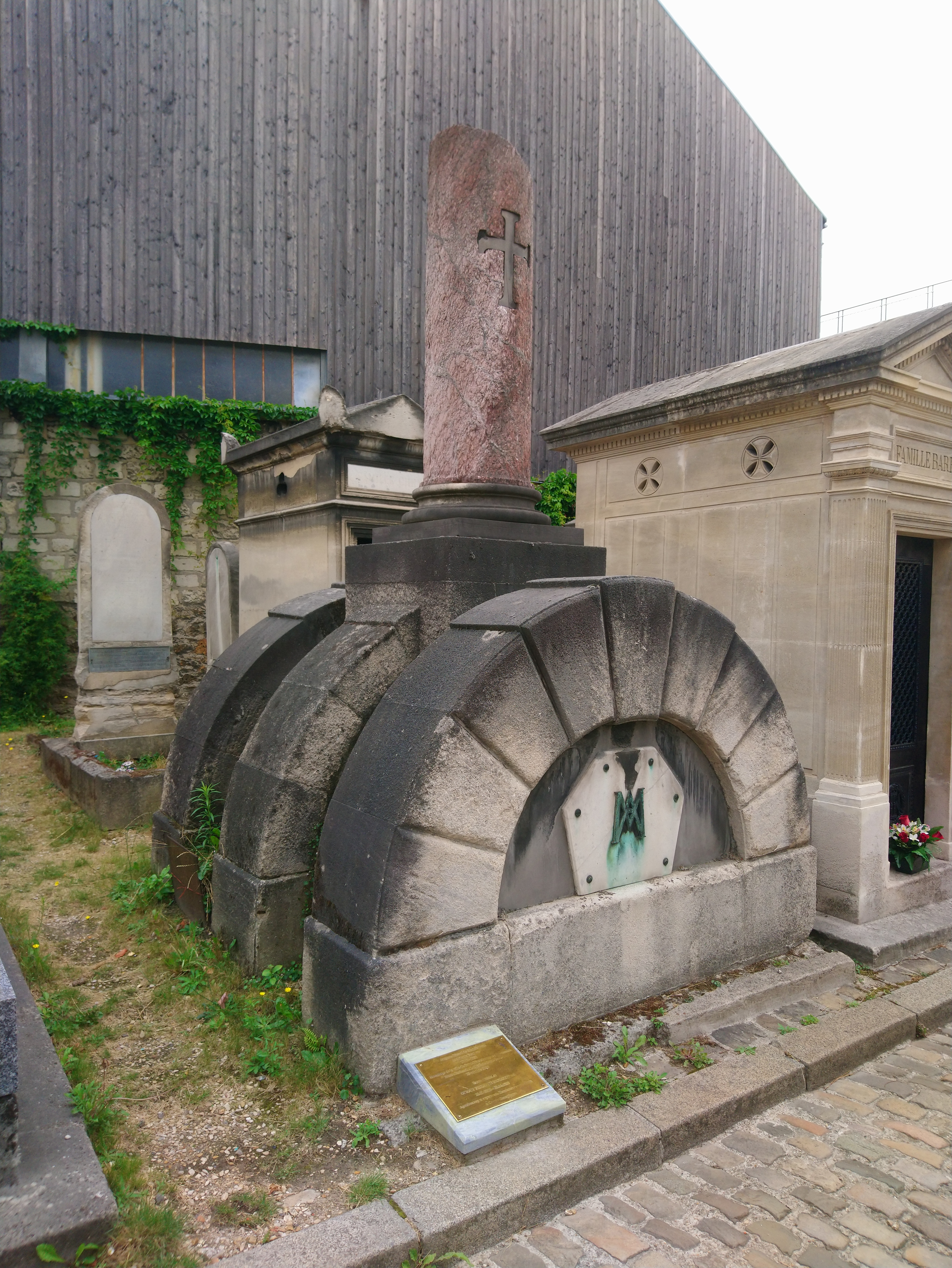
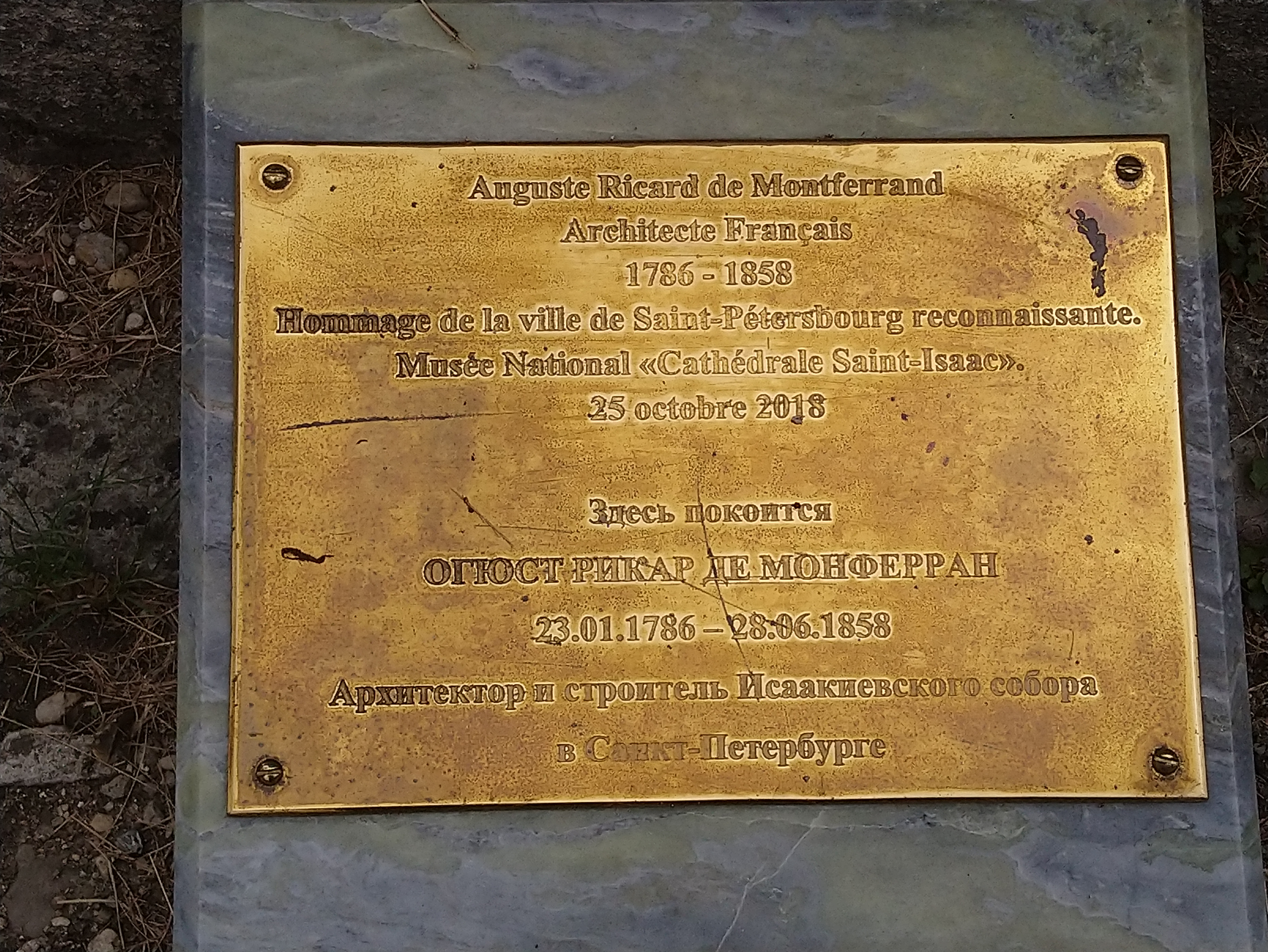
Montferrand's grave in Montmartre Cemetery, Paris, and the plaque on the grave.

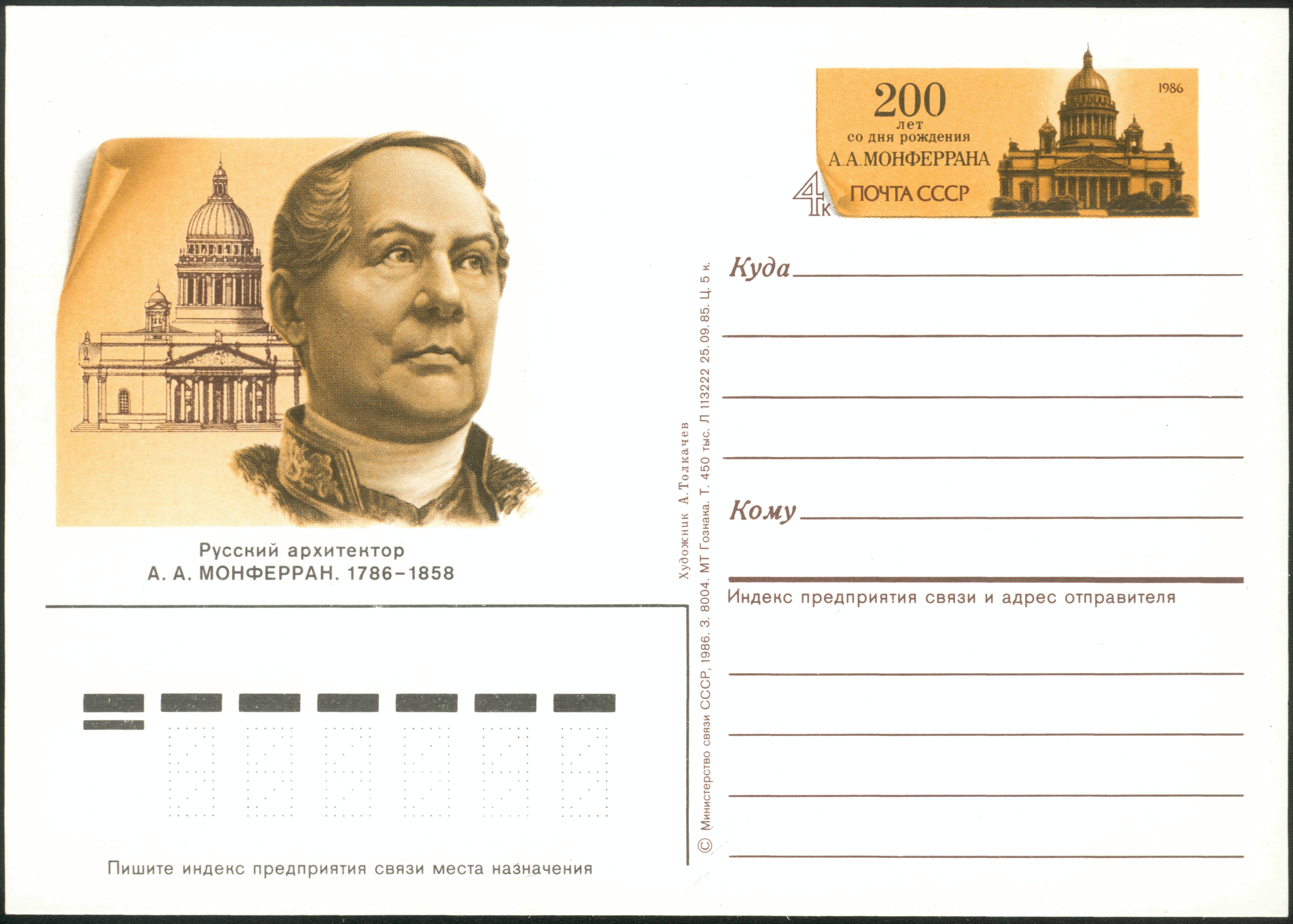
200 years after his birth, the USSR issued this commemorative stamp.

Montferrand died in St. Petersburg in 1858, the year St. Isaac's Cathedral was completed. His desire to be buried in the vault of that cathedral could not be executed, because he was not of the Orthodox faith. His body was returned to France and buried in Montmartre Cemetery, Paris, next to his mother. The grave, once believed to be lost, was identified in 1986 in Chemin des Gardes row. It bears the name Louise Fistioni (Montferrand's mother) and "AM", Montferrand's initials.

== Sources ==
- "Монферран, Август Августович" . Brockhaus and Efron Encyclopedic Dictionary (in Russian). 1906.
