= St Luke's Church, Preston =

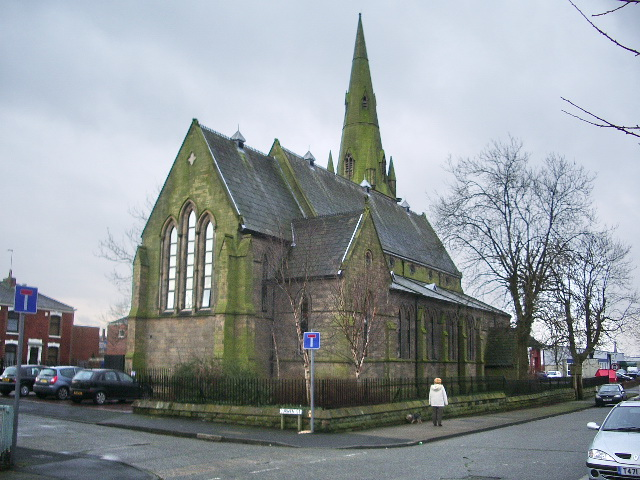
- St Luke's Church, Preston, from the southwest

- Location in Preston
- 53.7660°N 2.6836°W
- OS grid reference: SD 550 302
- Location: St Luke's Place, Preston, Lancashire
- Country: England
- Denomination: Anglican

Architecture
- Functional status: Redundant
- Heritage designation: Grade II
- Designated: 20 December 1989
- Architect: E. H. Shellard
- Architectural type: Church
- Style: Gothic Revival
- Groundbreaking: 1858
- Completed: 1859
- Construction cost: £4,733
- Closed: 1990

Specifications
- Capacity: 800
- Materials: Sandstone, slate roofs

St Luke's Church is a redundant Anglican parish church in St Luke's Place, Preston, Lancashire, England. The church is recorded in the National Heritage List for England as a designated Grade II listed building.

== History ==
The church was built in 1858–59 and designed by E. H. Shellard at an estimated cost of £4,733. It opened on 3 August 1859, and provided seating for 800 people. The church was declared redundant on 1 January 1990, and passed into residential use on 24 February 1995. It was converted into flats.

== Architecture ==
St Luke's is built in sandstone, has a slate roof, and is in Early English style. It consists of a six-bay nave with a clerestory, north and south aisles, a chancel with a north organ-house and a south vestry, and a southwest steeple. The tower is in five stages, and has a stair turret at the northwest corner. There is an arched doorway on the south side, and in the second and third stages are lancet windows. The fourth and fifth stages contain triple arcades, those in the fifth stage being bell openings with louvres. On the top corners are gargoyles in the form of angels, and octagonal pinnacles. On the summit of the tower is a broach spire with two tiers of lucarnes.

Along the sides of the aisles the bays are separated by buttresses, each bay containing a pair of lancet windows, and on each side of the clerestory are six circular windows. There is a porch in the second bay of the north aisle. At the west end of the nave are two tall lancet windows, with two smaller lancets below and a wheel window above. At the east end of the chancel is a stepped triple lancet window. There are more lancet windows at the west end of the south aisle, in the organ-house, and in the vestry. Most of the windows contain Geometrical tracery.

== See also ==
- Listed buildings in Preston, Lancashire
