= Listed buildings in Preston, Lancashire =

Preston is a city in Lancashire, England, that contains about 340 listed buildings. Its recorded history goes back to the Roman era, and in the medieval period it was a market town and a port, its first charter being granted in 1179. The city stands at the lowest crossing point of the River Ribble, which has given it great strategic importance. From the 16th century it was a centre for the spinning and weaving industries, and its greatest growth came from the 1770s with the development of steam power. By 1835 (when it was still a town) it contained 40 factories, and this had grown to 77 factories in 1869. Its population rose from about 12,000 in 1801 to about 69,000 in 1851, and one reflection of this was poor housing and social conditions. As a consequence of this there was fear of riots and other disturbances from the Chartists, the response to this being the building of Fulwood Barracks in the 1840s. There was much church building in the 19th century, including a number of notable Roman Catholic churches, reflecting the importance of Catholicism in the town and area. Later in the century and in the early 20th century the rise of civic pride and prosperity resulted in a number of notable civic buildings, particularly Fulwood Barracks. During the 20th century there was much clearing of slum properties, and of many other older buildings. The Preston Dock closed in the 1980s. Few of the 20th-century buildings have been listed, with the exception of the Central bus station and car park, which was opened in 1969 and had been threatened with demolition.

In the unparished area of Preston, there are about 340 buildings that are recorded in the National Heritage List for England as designated listed buildings. Of these, three are listed at Grade I, eleven at Grade II*, and the rest at Grade II (for the criteria of these grades see the Key below). Despite the long history of the town, only three of the listed buildings have their origins before the 17th century, and only about 25 date from the 18th century. The great majority date from the 19th century, reflecting the growth of the cotton industry in the town at that time, with cotton mills, housing for their workers, and churches for their worship. Many of the houses from the earlier part of the century are Georgian in style, and most of these are located to the south of the main streets of the town, Church Street and Fishergate. Later in the century public parks were created, and a number of listed buildings are associated with them. Later still, the great civic buildings were built, mainly in the centre of the town around Market Place.

== Key ==
Grade	Criteria
I	Buildings of exceptional interest, sometimes considered to be internationally important
II*	Particularly important buildings of more than special interest
II	Buildings of national importance and special interest

== Buildings ==
Name and location	Photograph	Date	Notes	Grade
Cross, Blackpool Road; 53.77012°N 2.67075°W	—	Late medieval	The cross is in sandstone. The oldest part is the pedestal and the rest dates probably from the 19th century. The pedestal is in the shape of a slightly tapered cube, and the cross itself is plain.	II
33 and 34 Market Place; 53.75905°N 2.69967°W		Late 16th to early 17th century	Originally one house, later two shops, the building is timber-framed and partly rendered, partly weatherboarded, and has Welsh slate roofs. It is in 1 1/2 storeys, and has a two-bay front, one of which is gabled with bargeboards. Internally, much timber framing has survived.	II
Lower Brockholes Farmhouse; 53.76717°N 2.64499°W	—	1634	The farmhouse is in pebbledashed brick with rendered dressings and a slate roof. It has an L-shaped plan consisting of a main three-bay range and a single-bay cross-wing. The farmhouse is in two storeys. It has a central porch above which is a carved plaque containing a shield and the date. The windows are casements, apart from a mullioned window at the rear.	II
115 and 115a Friargate; 53.76132°N 2.70480°W	—	Late 17th century (possible)	A public house that was altered in the 18th century and restored in 2015 and 2018. It is in brick with a slate roof, and has two storeys, and an attic and a cellar, with the gabled front facing the street. In the ground floor is a shop front with a central window flanked by two doorways, the right one recessed, and with pilasters and consoles. In the upper floor is a timber canted oriel window, and the gable contains a circular window. In the cellar is a well.	II
Former Unitarian Chapel; 53.76103°N 2.69230°W	—	1717	The chapel was enlarged in the 19th century, a polygonal apse was added in 1912, and it was converted into a house in 1996. It is built in brick, mostly rendered, with a slate roof. Much of the building has been altered, but on the east front is an Ionic doorcase with an entablature and a cornice.	II
Church of St George the Martyr; 53.75926°N 2.70271°W		1725–26	The church was expanded in 1799, encased in stone in 1843–44, a chancel was added by Edmund Sharpe in 1848, and the church was remodelled in 1884–85. It is built in sandstone with slate roofs, and is in Romanesque style. The church consists of a nave, aisles, transepts, a chancel with an apse, and a porch with a tower. Inside the church is a sequence of murals by Carl Almquist dated between 1885 and 1914.	II*
Bear's Paw public house 53.75954°N 2.69423°W		Early 18th century (probable)	The public house was remodelled in the 19th century. It is in brick with sandstone dressings, and has a slate roof. The building is in two storeys, and has a four-bay front. The doorway is elliptical-headed with engaged columns and an entablature. In the outer bays are round-headed doorways, one of which is blocked. The windows, some of which are sashes, have wedge lintels.	II
Olde Blue Bell public house 53.75982°N 2.69297°W		Early 18th century (probable)	A brick public house with a slate roof, altered in the 19th century. It has three storeys and a symmetrical three-bay front. The central doorway is round-headed with a pilastered surround, a fanlight, and a large semicircular hood. The windows are casements. At the rear are the remains of a two-storey stable (or brewhouse) with a sash window and a circular pitch hole.	II
Arkwright House; 53.75773°N 2.69470°W		1728	The house was expanded in the 19th century, and was restored in about 1979. It is in Georgian style, constructed in brick with a stuccoed façade, and has a slate roof. The house has an L-shaped plan, with three storeys, cellars and an attic, and has a five-bay front. The windows are sashes. In 1768 Richard Arkwright and John Kay worked in the house on designs for the water frame.	II*
29, 30 and 31 Church Street; 53.75923°N 2.69534°W	—	Mid 18th century (probable)	Originally a pair of houses, later used for shops and other purposes, they are built in brick, partly stuccoed, with sandstone dressings and a slate roof. The building is in three storeys, and each house has a front of four bays. In the ground floor are modern shop fronts, and above most windows are sashes. On the right side is a blocked doorway with fluted pilasters and a dentilled cornice.	II
11 Friargate; 53.75952°N 2.70096°W	—	Mid 18th century (probable)	Originally a house, later a shop, it is built in rendered brick and has a slate roof. The shop is in three storeys and has a single-bay front. In the ground floor is a modern shop front, and above is a single sash window in each floor. Inside are features that have survived from the 18th century.	II
Wychnor; 53.79542°N 2.73071°W	—	Mid 18th century	A farmhouse later converted into dwellings, built in stuccoed brick with a slate roof. It is in two storeys, and has a three-bay front, with later additions to the left and the rear. On the front is a gabled porch. The windows are mainly casements.	II
47 Friargate; 53.76048°N 2.70407°W	—	1755	A house, later rebuilt and used as a shop, in brick with sandstone dressings. In the ground floor is a modern shop front, to the right of which is an entry leading to a courtyard at the rear. In the courtyard are two small 19th-century brick cottages in two storeys with one room in each storey. The cottages are included in the listing.	II
Old Penwortham Bridge; 53.74895°N 2.71391°W		1759	Originally a toll bridge, it now a footbridge crossing the River Ribble. The bridge is built in stone and consists of five unequal segmental arches. The cutwaters rise to form refuges at the sides of the footpath. The parapets curve to form walls on the south side. The bridge is also a scheduled monument.	II
Milestone, Garstang Road (north); 53.79904°N 2.71621°W		Mid to late 18th century	The milestone is one of a series erected by the Preston and Garstang Turnpike Trust. It consists of a convex triangular stone about 1 metre (3.3 ft) high, with a rounded top. It is inscribed with the distances in miles to Garstang and Preston.	II
Milestone, Garstang Road (south); 53.78500°N 2.71191°W		Mid to late 18th century	The milestone is one of a series erected by the Preston and Garstang Turnpike Trust. It consists of a convex triangular stone about 1 metre (3.3 ft) high, with a rounded top. It is inscribed with the distances in miles to Garstang and Preston.	II
Bull and Royal Hotel; 53.75841°N 2.69702°W		c. 1770	This was built as a coaching inn, and an assembly room was added to the rear in about 1774. It has since been modified for other uses. The building is in brick, partly stuccoed, with sandstone dressings and a slate roof. It is in four storeys, and has an eight-bay front. In the ground floor are modern shop fronts and a carriage entry. In the floors above are sash windows. The assembly room is lit by Venetian windows, it contains a minstrels' gallery, and has rich plaster work.	II*
24–27 Frenchwood Knoll; 53.75317°N 2.68884°W	—	1774 or earlier	Originally a pair of houses known as Frenchwood House, it was later divided into four dwellings. The building is in brick with a slate roof. It is in two storeys, and has a nine-bay front. The features include two doorcases with engaged Tuscan columns, moulded lintels, and elliptical fanlights, and two canted bay windows. The windows are a mix of sashes and casements.	II
Walton Bridge; 53.75296°N 2.67963°W		1779–81	The bridge carries the A6 road over the River Ribble. It was designed by J. S. and R. Laws, and was widened between 1939 and 1950. The bridge is built in sandstone and consists of three long segmental arches with rusticated voussoirs. It has V-shaped cutwaters with pilasters above, a dentilled cornice, and a plain parapet with rounded coping.	II
Obelisk; 53.75890°N 2.69907°W		1782	This is in sandstone, and consists of a clustered shaft on a moulded base carrying a cap with a leaf motif and a cornice. It was dismantled in 1853, and re-erected in 1979 on three new steps and a pedestal.	II
St Wilfrid's Church; 53.75725°N 2.70277°W		1793	This Roman Catholic church was built to replace a smaller church on the site, it was expanded and remodelled in 1878, and its exterior was recased ten years later. It is built in brick with terracotta cladding and dressings, and has a slate roof; it is in the style of an Italian basilica. It consists of a nave, aisles, a baptistry, chapels, and an apse at the east end. Inside are large Corinthian columns.	II*
Former Moss Mill; 53.76395°N 2.70973°W		c. 1796	Originally a cotton spinning mill, later converted for other uses. It is in brick, mostly rendered, with a slate roof. The building is in five storeys, originally with a front of eleven bays. On the centre is a pediment.	II
Aqueduct over Sharoe Brook; 53.77727°N 2.73505°W	—	1797	The aqueduct carries the Lancaster Canal over the Sharoe Brook. The engineer was John Rennie. The aqueduct is constructed in sandstone and consists of a cylindrical conduit through the canal embankment. It has semicircular portals.	II
Aqueduct over Savick Brook; 53.77495°N 2.73125°W		1797	The aqueduct carries the Lancaster Canal over the Savick Brook. The engineer was John Rennie. The aqueduct is constructed in sandstone and consists of a cylindrical conduit through the canal embankment. The western portal has a segmental arch with rusticated voussoirs.	II
Bridge No. 14; 53.77641°N 2.73332°W		1797	An accommodation bridge over the Lancaster Canal. It is in sandstone and consists of a single elliptical arch with voussoirs, triple keystones, and rounded parapets.	II
Bridge No. 15; 53.77646°N 2.73967°W		1797	An accommodation bridge, later a footbridge, over the Lancaster Canal. It is in sandstone and consists of a single segmental arch with voussoirs and keystones.	II
Bridge No. 16; 53.77543°N 2.74524°W		1797	The bridge carries Cottam Lane over the Lancaster Canal, the engineer for which was John Rennie. It is in sandstone and consists of a single segmental arch with voussoirs and keystones.	II
11 Winckley Street; 53.75706°N 2.70168°W	—	1799 or 1800	A brick house on a stone plinth with sandstone dressings and a slate roof. It is in two storeys with cellars and an attic. Both the entrance front on Winckley Street, and the front facing Winckley Square, which is gabled, have five bays. The round-headed doorway has Tuscan pilasters, a frieze, and a cornice. Above the door is an overlight and a fanlight. Most of the windows are sashes with wedge lintels.	II
4 Winckley Square; 53.75697°N 2.70206°W		c. 1800	A brick house with sandstone dressings and a slate roof. It is in three storeys with a basement, and has a symmetrical five-bay front. The doorway is approached up three steps and has engaged Tuscan columns with fluted caps, a frieze, a semi-circular fanlight, and a pediment. There is another doorway on the Winckley Street front. The windows are sashes with wedge lintels. The railings in front of the basement area are included in the listing.	II
5–8 Winckley Street; 53.75743°N 2.70194°W	—	c. 1800	A row of four houses, later altered for other uses, built in brick with sandstone dressings and a slate roof. They are in three storeys with cellars. The doorways are square-headed with moulded architraves. To the right of the door of No. 7 is a bronze plaque with a bust of the poet Francis Thompson and an inscription.	II
13 Winckley Street; 53.75723°N 2.70209°W		c. 1800 (probable)	A brick house with sandstone dressings and a slate roof. later used as offices. It is in four storeys with cellars, and has a four-bay front. The doorway has a moulded architrave with dentils, and a cornice on consoles. The windows in the first floor are casements, and have small cast iron balconies. The other windows are sashes.	II
St James' Vicarage and Coach House; 53.75755°N 2.68848°W	—	c. 1800	The vicarage is in brick with sandstone dressings and a slate roof. It is in two storeys with cellars, and has a symmetrical three-bay front. In the centre is a large semicircular blind arch containing the doorway. Flanking this are large canted bay windows. The other windows are sashes. To the left of the house is the former coach house, a small square single-storey building with a pyramidal roof.	II
9 and 10 Chapel Street; 53.75723°N 2.70314°W	—	c. 1800–10	A pair of houses, later used as offices. They have three storeys and cellars, they are in brick with the ground floor stuccoed, and have a slate roof. The doors are in the centre within a single plain doorcase under a pediment with dentils. In the ground floor are square windows with wedge lintels and keystones. In the middle storey are sash windows, also with wedge lintels.	II
1A Chapel Street, 1 Winckley Square; 53.75688°N 2.70268°W	—	c. 1804	A pair of houses on a corner site, in brick with sandstone dressings and a slate roof. They are in three storeys with cellars. No. 1A Chapel Street has been used as offices. It has five bays on Winckley Square and six on Chapel Street. The doorway is round-headed with pilasters and a fanlight. No. 1 Winckley Square has been incorporated into St Wilfrid's Presbytery. It has a five-bay front and an elliptical-headed doorway with a fanlight. Both houses have sash windows with wedge lintels, and first floor balconies.	II
6 Winckley Square; 53.75695°N 2.70121°W		c. 1805	A brick house with sandstone dressings and a slate roof. It is in three storeys with a basement, and has a symmetrical five-bay front. The central round-headed doorway has a doorcase with paired Tuscan semi-columns, a plain frieze, a moulded cornice, and a fanlight. At the rear is a two-storey wing with a wagon archway.	II
Former Red Lion Hotel and Ellesmere Chambers; 53.75868°N 2.69709°W	—	c. 1809	Originally a hotel and offices, it is built in brick with sandstone dressings, both painted, and has slate roofs. The building is in four storeys, and has a three-bay front. On the ground floor are three Ionic pilasters, two former carriage entries, and a central doorway with pilasters, and a fanlight. Over the doorway and the carriage openings are broken pediments. Above the doorway are panels, one including a sculpture of a lion rampant. Most of the windows are sashes.	II
Ashton House; 53.76599°N 2.74247°W		c. 1810	The house was enlarged and remodelled in about 1850, and has since been used for other purposes. It is built mainly in sandstone, the rear walls in brick, and has slate roofs. It is in two storeys, and originally had a U-shaped plan, later extended. The front has three bays, with a central semicircular bow window, and a large cornice. It is flanked by recessed two-storey pavilions. On the roof is a large lantern, on each side of which is a semicircular window with an open pediment.	II
Main block, St Wilfrid's School; 53.75830°N 2.70390°W		1814	The school is built in brick with sandstone dressings and a slate roof. It has an L-shaped plan, is in two storeys with a basement, and has a seven-bay front, the central three bays projecting forward and pedimented. The central doorway has engaged Ionic columns, a frieze inscribed "CATHOLIC SCHOOL", a fanlight, and a moulded cornice. The windows are sashes with wedge lintels.	II
34, 35 and 36 Avenham Road; 53.75581°N 2.69828°W	—	1815–20	A row of brick houses with sandstone dressings and a slate roof, in three storeys with cellars. Each house has a round-headed doorway with a moulded architrave and a fanlight. There is also a lobby doorway with a plain lintel. The windows are sashes with wedge lintels.	II
Central Methodist Church; 53.75847°N 2.70322°W		1817	The church was remodelled in 1862–63. It is built in brick with a sandstone façade and a slate roof, and is in two storeys. The entrance front facing the street has a giant round arch flanked by pairs of Corinthian columns, and over which is a gabled cornice. At the sides of the arch is a round-headed window with a keystone in each storey. Within the arch, steps lead up to doorways above which is a Venetian window. There are more round-headed windows along the sides.	II
Moss Cottage; 53.76439°N 2.71138°W		1818	A brick house with sandstone dressings that was later extended and converted for other uses. The original house was a villa in Regency Gothic style in two storeys with a symmetrical three-bay front and a four-centred arched doorway. To the left is a taller wing, added in the later 19th century, in Tudor Revival style with two storeys and attics. Its features include mullioned and transomed windows, gables with finials, and a bay window with a pierced parapet.	II
36 Cannon Street; 53.75722°N 2.69957°W	—	c. 1820	A brick house with sandstone dressings and a slate roof later used for other purposes. It is in three storeys with a cellar and has a two-bay front. The round-headed doorway has engaged Tuscan columns a plain frieze, a moulded cornice, and a fanlight. The windows are sashes with wedge lintels.	II
1–4 Stanley Terrace, 86 and 87 Fishergate Hill; 53.75577°N 2.71223°W	—	c. 1820	A terrace of five brick houses with sandstone dressings and slate roofs. They are in three storeys with cellars. Most of the houses in Stanley Terrace have fronts of two bays, and those on Fishergate Hill have three bays. Other than No. 87 Fishergate Hill, which has a simple round-headed doorway, the houses have doorcases with engaged Tuscan columns, entablatures, and cornices. The windows in the bottom and middle storeys have wedge lintels.	II
Rectory, 13 Ribblesdale Place; 53.75443°N 2.70152°W	—	c. 1820	The rectory is in brick, partly stuccoed, with sandstone dressings and a slate roof. It is in two storeys with cellars, and has a symmetrical three-bay front. The doorway has engaged Tuscan columns, a frieze, a moulded cornice, and an elliptical-headed fanlight. The windows are casements with wedge lintels.	II
8 and 10 Great Avenham Street; 53.75498°N 2.69716°W	—	c. 1820–25	A pair of brick houses with sandstone dressings and slate roofs in Georgian style. They are in two storeys with cellars, and each house has a two-bay front. The doorways have round-headed architraves and semicircular fanlights. Between the houses is a lobby doorway. The windows are sashes, those in the ground floor having wedge lintels.	II
16 Grimshaw Street; 53.75927°N 2.69304°W	—	c. 1820–40	A brick house with sandstone dressings and a slate roof. It is in three storeys with a cellar. There are two sash windows in each floor, and to the right of these is an elliptical-headed doorway with a fanlight.	II
18 Grimshaw Street; 53.75923°N 2.69298°W	—	c. 1820–40	A brick house with sandstone dressings and a slate roof. It is in three storeys with a cellar, and has a three-bay front. There is a round-headed doorway with engaged Tuscan columns, a plain frieze, a moulded cornice, and a semicircular fanlight. The windows have wedge lintels.	II
95 Fishergate Hill; 53.75642°N 2.71075°W	—	Early 1820s	A brick house with sandstone dressings and a slate roof. It is in three storeys with cellars, and has a symmetrical three-bay front. The central elliptical-headed doorway has fluted Greek Doric columns and pilasters, a dentilled frieze, a cornice, and a fanlight with a Greek-key surround. The windows in the lower two storeys are sashes with wedge lintels; those in the top floor are casements.	II
20 and 21 Winckley Square; 53.75523°N 2.70233°W	—	Early 1820s (probable)	Originally a house, extended in the 1850s, and later used as a school then an office. It is built in brick with sandstone dressings and a slate roof. The building is in three storeys with a basement, and has a symmetrical five-bay front, and a single-bay extension to the right. The main doorway is approached up five steps, and has an elliptical-arched moulded architrave with a keystone, set-in Tuscan columns, a lintel and a fanlight. The windows are sashes with wedge lintels. In the extension is a doorway with an architrave of engaged columns with Egyptian caps and a dentilled cornice.	II
Former Public Hall; 53.75928°N 2.70356°W		1822–24	This originated as a corn exchange, designed by William Corey in Georgian style. It was remodelled in 1881–82 as the Public Hall, seating 3,300 people. This was closed in 1972. In 1986, to accommodate a ring road, the building was demolished apart from its front entrance and foyer. An extension was added to the rear, and it was then opened as a public house. What remains of the original building is the frontage that consists of a three-bay gabled entrance, and three-bay flanking wings.	II
37 and 38 Avenham Road; 53.75592°N 2.69842°W	—	1822–25 (probable)	A pair of brick houses with sandstone dressings and slate roofs. They are in two storeys with cellars. Both have doorways with stone architraves and fanlights; No. 37 is flat-headed with engaged Tuscan columns, No. 38 is round-headed with set-in Tuscan quarter-columns, and there is a raised lobby door immediately to the left. Most of the windows are sashes with wedge lintels.	II
39 and 40 Avenham Road; 53.75605°N 2.69859°W	—	1822–25 (probable)	A pair of brick houses with sandstone dressings and slate roofs. They are in two storeys with cellars. Both have doorways with stone architraves and fanlights; No. 39 is flat-headed with Tuscan columns, No. 40 is round-headed with Tuscan quarter-columns, and there is a raised lobby door immediately to the left. The windows are sashes with wedge lintels.	II
St Peter's Art Centre; 53.76357°N 2.70828°W		1822–25	This originated as a Commissioners' church designed by Thomas Rickman and Henry Hutchinson. The steeple was added in 1851–52 by Joseph Mitchell. The church is now redundant and is used by the University of Central Lancashire as an arts centre. The building is constructed in sandstone and is in Decorated style. It consists of a nave, aisles, a chancel, a vestry, and a steeple with flying buttresses supporting the spire. At the west end are two embattled porches, turrets and a crocketed bellcote.	II*
St Paul's Church; 53.76237°N 2.69421°W		1823–25	St Paul's was a Commissioners' church, and was designed by Thomas Rickman and Henry Hutchinson. A chancel and baptistry were added in 1882. The church is built in sandstone with a tiled roof, and is in Early English style. It consists of a nave with aisles, and a chancel. At the west end is a gable flanked by turrets. It is now redundant, and housed radio stations until 2020.	II
16–19 Winckley Square, 18 and 18A Ribblesdale Place, 5 Camden Place; 53.75521°N 2.70171°W	—	c. 1824–36	A terrace of six houses, later used as offices. They are in brick with sandstone dressings and slate roofs. The houses have three storeys and cellars, with twelve bays along Winckley Square, and three bays down the sides. They all have doorcases with Tuscan semi-columns, plain friezes, moulded cornices, and elliptical fanlights. The windows are sashes, most with wedge lintels.	II
8, 9A, 9B and 9C Ribblesdale Place; 53.75435°N 2.70044°W	—	1820s	A pair of brick houses with sandstone dressings and a slate roof, later used as offices. They are in two storeys with basements and attics. No. 8 has a front of two-bays, and No. 9 has three bays. Both houses have doorways with engaged Tuscan columns, plain friezes, moulded cornices, and elliptical fanlights. The windows are sashes with wedge lintels, and in the roof are gabled dormers. The railings in front of the basement areas are included in the listing.	II
19 Spring Bank, 91, 92 and 93 Fishergate Hill; 53.75629°N 2.71089°W	—	1820s	Originating as two houses, later converted into other uses, the buildings are in brick with sandstone dressings and a slate roof. They are in two storeys with basements, and each former house has a front of three bays. There are central round-headed doorways each with Tuscan semi-columns, a cornice, and a fanlight. The windows, most of which are sashes, have wedge lintels.	II
14, 16 and 18 Great Avenham Street; 53.75483°N 2.69692°W	—	c. 1825	A row of three brick houses with sandstone dressings and slate roofs in Georgian style. They are in two storeys with basements, and each house has a two-bay front. The doorways have round-headed architraves and semicircular fanlights. There is also a lobby doorway with a plain lintel. Most of the windows are sashes, and all have with wedge lintels.	II
21 Great Avenham Street; 53.75488°N 2.69661°W	—	c. 1825	A brick house with sandstone dressings and a slate roof in Georgian style. It is in two storeys with cellars, and has a two-bay front. The doorway has a round-headed architrave with set-in Tuscan quarter-columns, a plain lintel, and a semicircular fanlight. To the left is a lobby door. The windows are sashes with wedge lintels.	II
23 and 25 Great Avenham Street; 53.75485°N 2.69658°W	—	c. 1825	A pair of brick houses with sandstone dressings and slate roofs in Georgian style. They are in two storeys with cellars, and each house has a two-bay front. The doorways are round-headed with Tuscan quarter-columns and semicircular fanlights. Between the houses is a lobby doorway. The windows are sashes with wedge lintels.	II
12–18 Spring Bank; 53.75643°N 2.71141°W	—	c. 1825	A terrace of seven brick houses with sandstone dressings and slate roofs. They are in two storeys with cellars, and each house has a two-bay front. The doorways have elliptical heads, and the doorcases have engaged Tuscan columns, entablatures, moulded cornices, and fanlights. Canted bay windows have been added to two of the houses. Above the windows are wedge lintels.	II
Gates, gate piers and walls, St Peter's Churchyard; 53.76325°N 2.70820°W	—	1825	The gates, gate piers, and retaining wall are around the churchyard of St Peter's Church. The sandstone wall is on the west, south, and part of the east sides of the churchyard. The gate piers are tall and octagonal with prominent cornices and embattled caps. The gates are in wrought iron, are ramped, and have railings with spear heads.	II
Old Sessions House; 53.76126°N 2.68823°W		1825	A courthouse designed in Neoclassical style by Thomas Rickman, later the Museum of Lancashire. It is built in sandstone with a brick rear wall, and is in two storeys. On the symmetrical south front is a large porch with a round-headed archway. The west front is also symmetrical and is in five bays. There is a central porch with two unfluted Greek Doric columns. Inside, there is much rich plasterwork.	II
Thorn EMI Works; 53.76693°N 2.69932°W	—	c. 1825	This was originally a cotton spinning mill, Hanover Street Mills. It is built in brick with sandstone dressings and has roofs of slate and corrugated sheet. The building consists of a north block in three storeys with 14 bays, a south block in four storeys with 11 bays, and a single-storey linking block. There is a square turret at the rear.	II
13 Chapel Street; 53.75741°N 2.70323°W	—	Early 19th century	A brick house with sandstone dressings and a slate roof, later used as an office. It is in three storeys and has a symmetrical three-bay front. The central doorway has a pilastered architrave and a cornice on consoles. Most of the windows are sashes, those in the ground and middle floor having wedge lintels.	II
131A Church Street; 53.75910°N 2.69501°W	—	Early 19th century (probable)	A former warehouse, later used as a shop. It is built in brick with sandstone dressings, is in four storeys with a basement, and has a rectangular plan at right angles to the street. The gabled street face is in three bays, the central bay containing a loading slot. Flanking this in the ground floor are modern shop windows, and above are windows with rectangular lintels.	II
143 Church Street; 53.75834°N 2.69724°W	—	Early 19th century (probable)	Built as a shop and a dwelling, it is constructed in rendered brick with sandstone dressings and a slate roof. It is in four storeys and has a three-bay front. In the ground floor is a carriage entrance to the left, and a modern shop front. Above are sash windows.	II
1, 2, 2A, 2B and 2C Fishergate Hill; 53.75642°N 2.70999°W	—	Early 19th century	A brick building with a stone parapet in various uses. It is in three storeys with a front of six bays. Some windows are mullioned and transomed, but most are sashes. There are two doorways, each with columns, a cornice and an elliptical-headed fanlight. The right side is stuccoed.	II
29 Latham Street; 53.75472°N 2.69779°W	—	Early 19th century	A brick house with sandstone dressings and a slate roof, in two storeys. It has a four-bay front with a later wing on the left. The doorway has an elliptical head, and attached columns, a cornice, and a fanlight. The windows have wedge lintels, and most are sashes. On the right side is a two-storey bow window.	II
21 and 23 Lord Street; 53.76011°N 2.69701°W		Early 19th century	A warehouse in brick with sandstone dressings and a slate roof. It is in five storeys with a basement, and has a slightly angled and gabled front of six bays. The centre two bays contain a full-height blind arch with windows. The outer bays each has a loading bay with windows above; at the tops of these are crane openings, one with a steel crane beam protruding.	II
9 Winckley Square; 53.75648°N 2.70086°W	—	Early 19th century	A brick house, later incorporated into an office, with sandstone dressings and a slate roof. It is in three storeys with a cellar, and has a three-bay front. The doorway has an elliptical head, engaged Tuscan columns, and a fanlight. The windows are sashes, those in the lower two storeys with wedge lintels.	II
Ha-ha, Ashton House; 53.76567°N 2.74313°W	—	Early 19th century	The ha-ha is in front of Ashton House. It is built in sandstone, curves from the south-east round to north-west sides of house, and has been partly filled in.	II
Old Dog Inn; 53.75900°N 2.69531°W		Early 19th century (probable)	The public house, altered in 1898, is faced with rusticated ashlar on the ground floor, and is stuccoed above. It is in three storeys, and has a four-bay front. There is a wagon entry in the left bay, the other bays forming a symmetrical Neoclassical front with giant pilasters, a moulded cornice, and a central pediment containing a medallion. Over the central doorway is an elaborate pedimented canopy. The upper floor contains sash windows.	II
Unicorn Hotel; 53.76834°N 2.70438°W		Early 19th century	A public house in sandstone with a slate roof in Jacobean style. It has an L-shaped plan with a main block, and a long rear wing. The public house is in two storeys with basements, and has a symmetrical three-bay front, the central bay being gabled. There is a central doorway, flanked by single-storey canted bay windows.	II
Windmill, Cragg's Row; 53.76431°N 2.70378°W		Early 19th century (probable)	The tower of a former windmill, it is in brick and has a circular plan. It is in six stages, tapers as it rises, and has a modern flat cap. On the southwest side is a three-stage loading slot, with three small square windows above.	II
Carey Baptist Church; 53.76067°N 2.69398°W		1826	The church was built for the Countess of Huntingdon's Connexion, and later used as a Baptist church. It is in brick with a stuccoed entrance front and a slate roof. The entrance front is in two storeys with corner pilasters. The lower storey has a segmental-headed doorway in the middle and round-headed doorways on the side. Above are three round-headed windows and a pediment with an inscribed panel.	II
Deepdale Hall; 53.76603°N 2.69263°W		1829–33	Originating as a House of Recovery, it was extended by James Hibbert in 1866–70 and became Preston Royal Infirmary. At first in two storeys, a further two storeys were added in 1936 in Hibbert's style. The infirmary closed in 1987 and the building has been converted into students' accommodation. It is built in brick and has sandstone and rendered dressings. There is a symmetrical seven-bay front, containing a three-bay colonnaded portico with Roman Doric columns and an entablature with a cornice. The windows are sashes with wedge lintels.	II
1–6 Avenham Colonnade; 53.75406°N 2.69864°W	—	c. 1830	A terrace of six brick houses on a sandstone plinth with sandstone dressings and slate roofs. They are in two storeys with basements, and each house has a two-bay front. The doorways are round-headed and set in large sandstone architraves with cornices and fanlights. The ground floor windows have segmental heads, and those in the upper storey have wedge lintels. Most of the windows are sashes.	II
4, 6 and 8 Avenham Lane; 53.75462°N 2.69805°W	—	c. 1830	A row of brick houses with stone dressings and slate roofs. They are in two storeys with cellars, and each house has a two-bay front. The doorways are round-headed with Tuscan quarter columns and fanlights. No. 4 has a two-storey canted bay window; the other windows are sashes with wedge lintels. At the top of the building is a frieze and a cornice. The railings at the front of No. 4 are included in the listing.	II
12 Avenham Lane, 2 Latham Street; 53.75486°N 2.69766°W	—	c. 1830	A pair of brick houses with sandstone dressings and slate roofs, in two storeys with cellars. No. 12 Avenham Lane has a front of four bays, and No. 2 Latham Street has two. Both houses have doorcases of engaged Tuscan columns with a plain frieze and cornice. The fanlight of No. 12 Avenham Lane is round-headed, and that of No. 2 Latham Street is flat-headed. The windows have wedge lintels.	II
14 Avenham Lane; 53.75492°N 2.69762°W	—	c. 1830	A brick house with stone dressings and a slate roof. It is in two storeys with cellars and attics, it has a three-bay front, and is in an L-shaped plan. The doorway has a semi-elliptical head, Tuscan columns, a frieze, a cornice, and a fanlight. To the right of the doorway is a two-storey bow window, and to the left is a single-storey canted bay window. The other windows are sashes with wedge lintels. In the roof is a flat-roofed dormer.	II
9 Bank Parade; 53.75370°N 2.69579°W	—	c. 1830	A brick house on a stone plinth, later converted into flats, with sandstone dressings and a slate roof. It is in three storeys with a basement, and has a symmetrical front of three bays. The central doorway has a round head, and a doorcase with Ionic columns, an entablature, a cornice, and a fanlight. Above the doorway is a French window with a cast iron balcony. On each side of the doorway are single-storey canted bay windows. The windows, some of which are sashes, all have wedge lintels.	II
2–12 and 12A Bushell Place, 1 Porter Place; 53.75421°N 2.69772°W	—	c. 1830	A terrace of 13 houses in brick with sandstone dressings and slate roofs. They are in two storeys with cellars and attics, and each house has a three-bay front. All the houses have a Tuscan doorcase with engaged columns, a plain frieze, a moulded cornice, and an elliptical fanlight. Almost all the windows are sashes.	II
14, 15, 16 Bushell Place, 2 Porter Place; 53.75376°N 2.69692°W	—	c. 1830	A terrace of four houses in brick with sandstone dressings and slate roofs. They are in three storeys, and have fronts of two or three bays. The doorways have engaged Ionic columns with an entablature and elliptical fanlights. Each house has a two-storey canted bay window.	II
1–4 Camden Place; 53.75487°N 2.70135°W	—	c. 1830	A row of three houses in brick with sandstone dressings and slate roofs. They are in two storeys with cellars, and each house has a two-bay front. All the houses have a Tuscan doorcase with engaged columns, a plain frieze, a moulded cornice, and an elliptical fanlight. Almost all the windows are sashes.	II
6 and 7 Chaddock Street; 53.75598°N 2.69905°W	—	c. 1830	A pair of brick houses with sandstone dressings and slate roofs in Georgian style. They are in two storeys with cellars, and together are in five bays. The doorways are round-headed with set-in Tuscan quarter-columns, plain lintels, and semicircular fanlights. In the centre of the houses is a lobby door with a blind window above. This door and the windows, most of which contain sashes, have wedge lintels.	II
10 and 11 Chaddock Street; 53.75572°N 2.69872°W	—	c. 1830	A pair of brick houses with sandstone dressings and slate roofs in Georgian style. They are in two storeys with cellars. The doorways are round-headed with Tuscan quarter-columns, plain lintels, and semicircular fanlights. In the centre of the houses is a lobby door; this, the sash windows, and a blind window, all have wedge lintels.	II
28–31 Chaddock Street; 53.75509°N 2.69832°W	—	c. 1830	A row of four houses with sandstone dressings and slate roofs in Georgian style. They are in two storeys with cellars, and each house has a two-bay front. The doorways are in pairs with round-headed architraves, three Tuscan quarter-columns, plain lintels, and semicircular fanlights. The windows have wedge lintels, and most are sashes.	II
32–35 Chaddock Street; 53.75527°N 2.69852°W	—	c. 1830	A row of four houses with sandstone dressings and slate roofs in Georgian style. They are in two storeys with cellars, and each house has a two-bay front. The doorways have round-headed architraves with set-in Tuscan quarter-columns, plain lintels, and semicircular fanlights. The windows, some of which are sashes, have wedge lintels.	II
36 and 37 Chaddock Street; 53.75539°N 2.69868°W	—	c. 1830	A pair of brick houses with sandstone dressings and slate roofs in Georgian style. They are in two storeys with cellars, and each house has a two-bay front. The doorways are coupled with round-headed architraves, three Tuscan quarter-columns. The windows have wedge lintels; those of No. 37 are sashes.	II
45 and 46 Chaddock Street, 1 Bairstow Street; 53.75584°N 2.69922°W	—	c. 1830	A row of three houses on a corner site. They are in brick with sandstone dressings and slate roofs, and are in Georgian style. The houses are in two storeys with cellars; there are four bays facing Chaddock Street and three facing Bairstow Street. The doorways have round-headed architraves, Tuscan quarter-columns, plain lintels, and semicircular fanlights. Over the windows are wedge lintels.	II
47 and 48 Chaddock Street; 53.75601°N 2.69939°W	—	c. 1830	A pair of brick houses with sandstone dressings and slate roofs in Georgian style. The houses are in two storeys with cellars, and each house has a three-bay front. The doorways have round-headed architraves, set-in Tuscan quarter-columns, plain lintels, and semicircular fanlights. Over the windows are wedge lintels.	II
11 Cross Street; 53.75624°N 2.69964°W	—	c. 1830	A brick house with sandstone dressings and a slate roof. It is in two storeys with cellars, and has a two-bay front. The round-headed doorcase has engaged Tuscan columns with a shallow cornice and a fanlight. To the right is a lobby door. The windows are sashes with wedge lintels.	II
1–8 Frenchwood Street; 53.75530°N 2.69648°W	—	c. 1830	A row of eight brick houses with sandstone dressings and slate roofs in Georgian style. The houses are in two storeys with cellars, and each house has a two-bay front. The doorways are coupled with lobby doors between them. They have round-headed architraves, set-in Tuscan quarter-columns, plain lintels, and semicircular fanlights. The windows have wedge lintels.	II
9–15 Frenchwood Street; 53.75518°N 2.69628°W	—	c. 1830	A row of seven brick houses with sandstone dressings and slate roofs in Georgian style. The houses are in two storeys with cellars, and each house has a two-bay front. The doorways are coupled with lobby doors between them. They have round-headed architraves, set-in Tuscan quarter-columns, plain lintels, and semicircular fanlights. The windows, some of which are sashes, have wedge lintels.	II
20, 22 and 24 Great Avenham Street; 53.75474°N 2.69679°W	—	c. 1830	A row of three brick houses with sandstone dressings and slate roofs in Georgian style. They are in two storeys with cellars, and each house has s front of two bays. The doorway of No. 20 has panelled pilasters; the other doorways have engaged Tuscan columns, plain friezes, moulded lintels, and fanlights. Over the windows are wedge lintels.	II
26 and 28 Great Avenham Street; 53.75461°N 2.69658°W	—	c. 1830	A pair of brick houses with sandstone dressings and slate roofs in Georgian style. They are in three storeys with cellars. No. 26 has a front of two bays, and a doorcase of engaged Tuscan columns with a plain frieze, a moulded cornice, and a segmental fanlight. No. 28 is in a single bay and has a round-headed architrave with set-in Tuscan quarter-columns, and a semi-circular fanlight. All the windows are sashes with wedge lintels.	II
30, 32 and 34 Great Avenham Street; 53.75450°N 2.69641°W	—	c. 1830	A row of three brick houses with Welsh slate roofs in Georgian style. They are in three storeys with cellars, and have fronts of one or two bays. Each doorway has attached columns, a frieze, and a moulded cornice. The windows are a mix of sashes and casements.	II
36 and 38 Great Avenham Street; 53.75442°N 2.69628°W	—	c. 1830	A pair of brick houses with slate roofs in Georgian style. They are in two storeys with cellars, and each house has a front of two bays. The doorways are in the centre, with a lobby door between; the domestic doorways have set-in Tuscan columns with moulded lintels and elliptical fanlights. Above the windows are wedge lintels.	II
40 Great Avenham Street; 53.75439°N 2.69625°W	—	c. 1830	A brick house with sandstone dressings and slate roofs in Georgian style. It is in two storeys with a cellar, and has a two-bay front. The doorway has a round-headed architrave and a semicircular fanlight, with a lobby door to the right. The windows have wedge lintels.	II
42 Great Avenham Street; 53.75431°N 2.69614°W	—	c. 1830	A brick house with sandstone dressings and slate roofs in Georgian style. It is in two storeys with a cellar, and has a two-bay front. The doorway is round-headed with Tuscan quarter-columns, and has a semicircular fanlight. The windows are sashes with wedge lintels.	II
17 and 18 Latham Street; 53.75407°N 2.69633°W	—	c. 1830	A pair of brick houses with sandstone dressings and a slate roof. They are in two storeys with cellars, and each house has a two-bay front. The doorways are in the centre, with a lobby door between them. The domestic doorways are elliptical-headed with set-in columns and fanlights. The windows, some of which are sashes, have wedge lintels.	II
19 and 20 Latham Street; 53.75407°N 2.69633°W	—	c. 1830	A pair of brick houses with sandstone dressings and a slate roof. They are in two storeys with cellars, and each house has a two-bay front. The doorways are in the centre, with a lobby door between them. The domestic doorways are round-headed with engaged Ionic columns, a frieze, a cornice, a fanlight, and painted brick voussoirs. The windows have wedge lintels.	II
21 Latham Street; 53.75401°N 2.69623°W	—	c. 1830	A brick house with sandstone dressings and a slate roof. The side wall is rendered, and on the corner are quoins. It is in two storeys with a cellar, and has a two-bay front. The elliptical-headed doorway has engaged Tuscan columns, a frieze, a cornice, and a fanlight. The windows are sashes with wedge lintels.	II
1 and 2 Ribblesdale Place; 53.75416°N 2.69899°W	—	c. 1830	A pair of brick houses with sandstone dressings and a slate roof, later used as offices. They are in two storeys with basements and attics, and each house has a three-bay front. No. 1 has a doorcase of engaged Tuscan columns with a plain frieze, a moulded cornice, and an elliptical fanlight. The doorway to No. 2 is elliptical-headed, and has a tripartite doorcase with moulded lintel and a fanlight. The windows are sashes with wedge lintels. In front of the basement areas are ornamental railings that are included in the listing.	II
3 Ribblesdale Place; 53.75421°N 2.69952°W	—	c. 1830	A brick house with sandstone dressings and a hipped slate roof. It is in two storeys with a basement, and has a symmetrical three-bay front. In the centre is a stone porch with Ionic columns and pilasters, a plain frieze and a moulded cornice, behind which is an elliptical-arched doorway. The windows are sashes with wedge lintels. At the rear is a bow window, and an extension with an oriel window. In front of the basement are ornamental railings that are included in the listing.	II
5 Stanley Terrace; 53.75592°N 2.71244°W	—	c. 1830	A brick house with sandstone dressings and a slate roof. It is in three storeys with a cellar, and has a two-bay front. The elliptical doorway has engaged Tuscan columns, an entablature, and a cornice. The windows have wedge lintels.	II
6 and 7 Stanley Terrace; 53.75600°N 2.71253°W	—	c. 1830	A pair of brick houses with sandstone dressings and a slate roof. They are in two storeys with cellars, and each house has a two-bay front. In the centre is a lobby door, and this is flanked by round-headed doorways with engaged Tuscan columns, an entablature, and a cornice. The windows have wedge lintels, and each house has an attic dormer.	II
8 Stanley Terrace; 53.75608°N 2.71263°W	—	c. 1830	A brick house with sandstone dressings and a slate roof. It is in two storeys with a cellar, and has a three-bay front. The doorway has engaged Ionic columns, an entablature with a moulded cornice, and a fanlight. The windows are sashes with wedge lintels.	II
1 Walton's Parade; 53.75619°N 2.70993°W	—	c. 1830	A brick house with sandstone dressings and a slate roof. It is in two storeys with a basement, and has a symmetrical three-bay front. The central doorway has engaged Ionic columns with a plain frieze, a moulded cornice, and an elliptical-headed fanlight. The windows are sashes with wedge lintels.	II
14 and 15 Winckley Square; 53.75532°N 2.70118°W	—	c. 1830	A pair of houses, later used as offices, in brick with sandstone dressings and a slate roof. They are in three storeys with cellars and attics, and each house has a three-bay front. Both houses have doorcases with engaged columns, plain friezes and moulded cornices, No. 14 being in Tuscan style, and No. 15 in Ionic style. The windows are sashes with wedge lintels. At the rear of No. 15 is a former coach house, and in front of the basement areas are cast iron railings; these are included in the listing.	II
27 Winckley Square; 53.75607°N 2.70269°W		c. 1830	A house, later used as part of Preston Catholic College, then an office. It is in brick with sandstone dressings and a slate roof. The building is in three storeys with a basement, and has a four-bay front. The doorway has engaged Ionic columns, a plain frieze, a moulded cornice, and a rectangular fanlight. The windows are sashes with wedge lintels.	II
30 and 31 Winckley Square; 53.75635°N 2.70279°W	—	c. 1830	A pair of brick houses with sandstone dressings and a slate roof later used for other purposes. They have three storeys with a basement, and each house has a two-bay front. The doorways have engaged Tuscan columns with a plain frieze, a moulded cornice, and an elliptical fanlight. The windows are sashes with wedge lintels.	II
Bushell House; 53.75451°N 2.69818°W	—	c. 1830	A house, later converted into flats, built in brick with sandstone dressings and a slate roof. It is in three storeys with cellars, and has a symmetrical three-bay front. The central doorway has engaged Tuscan columns with a plain frieze, a moulded cornice, and a fanlight. This is flanked by two-storey canted bay windows. The windows are sashes. The railings attached to the house are included in the listing.	II
Moor Park Hotel; 53.76901°N 2.70525°W		c. 1830	A public house built in brick on a stone plinth with sandstone dressings and a slate rood, and designed in Neoclassical style. It is in two storeys with cellars, and has a symmetrical three-bay front. At the centre is a portico with four engaged Ionic columns, a frieze, and a moulded cornice. Most of the windows are sashes.	II
Moor Park House; 53.77130°N 2.70518°W	—	c. 1830	A detached house in brick with sandstone dressings and a hipped slate roof, later used as offices. It is in two storeys and has a symmetrical three-bay front. The central doorway, approached up three steps, has a porch with Ionic columns and pilasters, an entablature with a cornice, and a fanlight. The windows are sashes.	II
7 Winckley Square; 53.75680°N 2.70109°W	—	1830–31	A brick house with sandstone dressings and a hipped slate roof, later used as an office. It is in three storeys with cellars, and has a long rectangular plan at right angles to the street. The street front is in four bays, and has a plain doorway with an egg-and-dart lintel. In the ground floor are horizontal brick pilasters, and there are corner pilasters in the upper floors. The windows are sashes, those in the middle storey having cornices on consoles.	II
44 and 45 Frenchwood Street; 53.75453°N 2.69565°W	—	c. 1830–35	A pair of brick houses with sandstone dressings and slate roofs. They are in two storeys with cellars, and each house has a single-bay front. The doorways have round-headed architraves with Tuscan quarter-columns, lintels, and semicircular fanlights. Between the houses is a lobby door. The windows have wedge lintels.	II
60, 61 and 62 Frenchwood Street; 53.75517°N 2.69660°W	—	c. 1830–35	A row of three brick houses with sandstone dressings and slate roofs. They are in two storeys with cellars, and each house has a two-bay front. The doorways have round-headed architraves with Tuscan quarter-columns, lintels, and semicircular fanlights. Between the house is a lobby door. Most of the windows are sashes and all have wedge lintels.	II
63–67 Frenchwood Street; 53.75532°N 2.69681°W	—	c. 1830–35	A row of five brick houses with sandstone dressings and slate roofs in Georgian style. They are in two storeys with cellars, and have fronts of one or two bays. The doorways have round-headed architraves with Tuscan quarter-columns, lintels, and semicircular fanlights. Between the houses are lobby doors. The ground floor windows have wedge lintels.	II
60 West Cliff; 53.75331°N 2.70917°W	—	c. 1830–36 (probable)	A brick house with sandstone dressings and a slate roof. It is in two storeys with an attic and cellars, and has a symmetrical three-bay front. The central doorway has an Ionic doorcase with a fanlight. The windows are sashes with wedge lintels.	II
88 and 89 Fishergate Hill; 53.75599°N 2.71176°W	—	c. 1830–40	A pair of brick houses, later used for other purposes, with sandstone dressings and slate roofs. They are in three storeys with basements, and each house has a symmetrical three-bay front. In the centre of each house is a porch with fluted Doric columns, unfluted pilasters, an entablature, and a moulded cornice. Most of the windows are sashes.	II
95 Fishergate; 53.75786°N 2.70314°W	—	c. 1830–50	A brick house, later used as a shop, with sandstone dressings and a slate roof. It is in three storeys and has a three-bay front. In the ground floor is a modern shop front. Above are sash windows, those in the middle storey having wedge lintels. On the left side are quoins.	II
24 and 25 Ribblesdale Place; 53.75467°N 2.70134°W	—	1832 (probable)	A pair of brick houses with sandstone dressings and slate roofs. They are in two storeys with cellars and attics. No. 24 has a front of three bays, and No. 25 has two. They have doorcases with engaged Ionic columns, a plain frieze, a moulded cornice, and an elliptical fanlight. The windows are sashes with wedge lintels. No. 24 also has a gabled dormer. In its back yard is a pump dated 1832, which is included in the listing.	II
St Ignatius' Church; 53.76359°N 2.69665°W		1833–36	A Roman Catholic church designed by J. J. Scoles, with the chancel, chapels, and transepts added in 1858 by J. A. Hansom, and further alterations in 1885–86. It is built in sandstone and has slate roofs. The church is in Perpendicular style, and consists of a nave, aisles, transepts, a chancel with chapels, and a steeple flanked by a chapel and a baptistry. On the tower are battlements and corner pinnacles, and there are more pinnacles along the sides of the clerestory.	II*
Prison annexe 53.76151°N 2.68944°W		1834	Originating as the governor's house, this is built in sandstone and has slate roofs. The castellated central block is in three storeys, with a three-bay front, octagonal corner turrets, and an embattled porch. To the left is a single-storey wing, and to the right is a two-storey wing with a blocked central archway.	II
8 East Cliff; 53.75313°N 2.70494°W	—	c. 1835	A detached house, later used as offices, in brick with sandstone dressings and a slate roof. It is in two storeys with a basement, and has a symmetrical three-bay front. The doorway has coupled pilasters and an entablature with a dentilled cornice. The windows are sashes, and there are two bow windows on the south front.	II
48–52 Frenchwood Street; 53.75476°N 2.69599°W	—	c. 1835	A row of five brick houses, one roughcast, with sandstone dressings and a slate roof. They are in two storeys with cellars, each house has a two-bay front, and all the houses have rear extensions. Three houses have round-headed architraves with Tuscan quarter-columns, plain lintels, and semicircular fanlights; the other two are square-headed with moulded architraves, cornices on consoles, and rectangular fanlights. Most of the windows are sashes.	II
53 and 54 Frenchwood Street; 53.75488°N 2.69617°W	—	c. 1835	A pair of five brick houses with sandstone dressings and a slate roof. They are in two storeys with cellars, and each house has a two-bay front. The paired doorways have round-headed architraves with Tuscan quarter-columns, plain lintels, and semicircular fanlights. The windows have wedge lintels.	II
55 and 56 Frenchwood Street; 53.75496°N 2.69629°W	—	c. 1835	A pair of five brick houses with sandstone dressings and a slate roof. They are in two storeys with cellars, and each house has a two-bay front. The paired doorways have round-headed architraves with Tuscan quarter-columns, plain lintels, and semicircular fanlights. The windows, some of which are sashes, have wedge lintels.	II
57, 58 and 59 Frenchwood Street; 53.75504°N 2.69641°W	—	c. 1835–40	A row of three brick houses with sandstone dressings and a slate roof. They are in two storeys with cellars, and have fronts of two and three bays. The doorways of Nos. 57 and 58 are coupled; they all have moulded architraves with dentilled cornices on consoles. There are two lobby doors, and the ground floor windows have wedge lintels.	II
Presbytery, St Ignatius Church; 53.76386°N 2.69700°W	—	1835–40	The presbytery was probably designed by J. J. Scoles, it is in Tudor style, and was extended in 1878. It is in brick with sandstone dressings and has a slate roof. The building is in two storeys, and has octagonal corner turrets and a parapet. The original portion has a symmetrical three-bay front with a central porch that has corner pilasters, a Tudor arched doorway, and an embattled parapet.	II
Grimshaw Street School; 53.75890°N 2.69178°W	—	1836	The school was extended in 1845 and in 1882. It is built in brick with sandstone dressings and slate roofs. The school has an L-shaped plan, the 1882 extension forming a cross-wing. The older parts are in two storeys, with a front of eight bays. In the right bay is a round-headed doorway with a fanlight, above which is a plaque inscribed "BOYS". The left side is gabled, and contains doorways with Tuscan pilasters, and a plaque inscribed "GIRLS". The later wing is in a single storey and has five bays.	II
St Andrew's Church; 53.76887°N 2.73603°W		1836	The church is built in sandstone and has slate roofs. It was altered and extended in 1873–74 and a vestry was added in 1903. It consists of a nave, a north aisle, a north porch, a chancel, a vestry to the east, and a small west tower. The tower is in Romanesque style, and the rest of the church is Early English. The tower is in three stages and has a broach spire.	II
St Mary's Church; 53.76156°N 2.68665°W		1836–37	The church was designed by John Latham, and is Romanesque Revival style. Transepts and a chancel were added in a similar style by E. H. Shellard in 1852–56. The church is built in sandstone with slate roofs. It consists of a nave, transepts, a chancel, and a tower with a short spire and lucarnes. The church was converted into a conservation centre in 2006.	II
7–10 Fishergate Hill; 53.75607°N 2.71070°W	—	1836–40	A row of four brick houses, later used for other purposes, with sandstone dressings and slate roofs. They are in two storeys with cellars, and each house has a two-bay front, and a canted single-storey bay window. The doorcases have engaged Ionic columns, fanlights, plain entablatures, and cornices.	II
St Ignatius' School; 53.76416°N 2.69683°W	—	c. 1836–42	The school was probably designed by J. J. Scoles, it is in Tudor style, and it has been extended on a number of occasions. The school is in a single storey, and is in brick with sandstone dressings and a slate roof. Its features include a Tudor arched doorway, octagonal corner turrets, and mullioned and transomed windows. Part of the parapet is embattled.	II
Railway viaduct 53.74993°N 2.70621°W		1837–38	The viaduct carries the railway over the River Ribble. It was built for the North Union Railway Company, doubled in width in 1879–80, and now carries the West Coast Main Line. The viaduct is in sandstone, is approximately 200 metres (660 ft) long, and has five segmental arches with rusticated voussoirs. Along the top is a moulded cornice and a plain parapet.	II
St Thomas' Church; 53.76657°N 2.70357°W		1837–39	The church was designed by John Latham, and is in Romanesque style. It is built in sandstone and has a slate roof. The church consists of a nave with aisles, a chancel with a polygonal apse and a tower above the chancel. The tower is in three stages, and is surmounted by a broach spire.	II
Larches House; 53.76408°N 2.75219°W	—	1838	A detached brick house with sandstone dressings and slate roofs. The house has a rectangular plan, and there is an attached service wing. The main house is in two storeys and has a symmetrical three-bay front. The entrance front has a porch with two Ionic columns and a dentilled cornice. On the sides are large bay windows, one with Corinthian pilasters and a parapet. The windows are sashes.	II
North Road Pentecostal Church; 53.76316°N 2.69836°W		1838	The church was built as a Wesleyan Methodist Church, and was partly rebuilt in 1885–86 by James Hibbert. It is in brick with sandstone dressings and has a slate roof. The entrance consists of a protruding porch with steps leading up to three doorways with architraves and fanlights, the central one having Tuscan columns. Above these is a pierced parapet. Behind this are five bays with round-headed windows and a central pediment. Along the sides are two tiers of round-headed windows.	II
Portico and towers, St Augustine's of Canterbury Church; 53.75596°N 2.69163°W		1838–40	The Roman Catholic church was designed by F. W. Tuach, but in 2004–05 all but the west front was replaced. This is built in brick and sandstone. What remains consists of a portico with four Ionic columns and a dentilled pediment flanked by porches. Behind the portico are two side towers that were added in 1890. On top of the towers are octagonal cupolas with crosses.	II
Railway bridges and viaduct 53.76493°N 2.71539°W		1840	The bridges carry the railway over Fylde Road and over the former course of the Lancaster Canal, continuing as a viaduct. They were built for the Lancaster and Preston Junction Railway, for which the engineer was Joseph Locke. The bridges are in sandstone, and the viaduct is in brick. The bridges each consist of a segmental arch flanked by round-headed arches, and the viaduct is carried on seven semicircular arches.	II
5 Bank Parade; 53.75381°N 2.69536°W	—	c. 1840	A brick house on a stone plinth, later converted into flats, with sandstone dressings and a slate roof. It is in three storeys with a basement, and has a front of two bays. Steps lead up to a doorway with three-quarter columns, an entablature, and a fanlight. In the ground floor is a canted bay window. The windows have wedge lintels. On the other side of the road is a garden bordered by railings with urn finials, which are included in the listing.	II
6 and 7 Bank Parade; 53.75376°N 2.69551°W	—	c. 1840	A pair of brick houses on a stone plinth with sandstone dressings and a slate roof. They are in two storeys with basements, they have a symmetrical front, and each house has two bays. In the centre is a lobby door. The doorways are in the outer bays, and each has a doorcase with Ionic semi-columns, an entablature, a cornice, and an elliptical fanlight. The windows have wedge lintels.	II
8 Bank Parade; 53.75372°N 2.69567°W	—	c. 1840	A brick house on a stone plinth with sandstone dressings and a slate roof. It is in three storeys with a basement, and has a front of two bays. Steps lead up to a doorway with Ionic columns, an entablature, a cornice, and an elliptical fanlight. To the right of this is a two-storey canted bay window.	II
10 Bank Parade; 53.75364°N 2.69592°W	—	c. 1840	A brick house with sandstone dressings and a slate roof. It is in two storeys with attics, and has a symmetrical front of three bays. In the centre is a porch with columns, an entablature, and a cornice, above which is a window with a cornice on corbels. In the roof are three dormers, and at the rear is a two-storey extension.	II
11 Bank Parade; 53.75360°N 2.69606°W	—	c. 1840	A brick house on a stone plinth with sandstone dressings and a slate roof. It is in three storeys with a basement, and has a front of two bays. The doorway has semi-columns, an entablature with wreathes, and a dentilled cornice; to the right is a lobby doorway. In the centre is a canted bay window.	II
17 and 18 Chaddock Street; 53.75552°N 2.69839°W	—	c. 1840	A pair of brick houses with sandstone dressings and slate roofs in Georgian style. They are in two storeys with cellars, and each house has a two-bay front. The doorways have elliptical arches and square-headed doorcases with moulded surrounds, cornices, and semi-elliptical fanlights. The windows have wedge lintels.	II
19 Chaddock Street; 53.75542°N 2.69835°W	—	c. 1840	A brick house with sandstone dressings and slate roofs in Georgian style. It is in two storeys with a cellar, and has a two-bay front. The doorway has a round-headed architrave with set-in Tuscan quarter-columns, a plain lintel, and a semicircular fanlight. To the right is a lobby door with a plain lintel. The windows have wedge lintels.	II
20 Chaddock Street; 53.75538°N 2.69827°W	—	c. 1840	A brick house with sandstone dressings and slate roofs in Georgian style. It is in two storeys with a cellar, and has a two-bay front. The doorway has an elliptical arch, engaged Tuscan columns, a moulded frieze, and a fanlight. The windows have wedge lintels.	II
21 Chaddock Street; 53.75532°N 2.69825°W	—	c. 1840	A brick house with sandstone dressings and slate roofs in Georgian style. It is in two storeys with a cellar, and has a two-bay front. In the right bay are two doorways. The domestic doorway is round-headed with Tuscan quarter-columns, a moulded cornice, and a semicircular fanlight. To the right of this is a lobby doorway with a plain surround. The windows have wedge lintels.	II
38 and 39 Chaddock Street; 53.75548°N 2.69881°W	—	c. 1840	A pair of brick houses with sandstone dressings and slate roofs in Georgian style. They are in two storeys at the front and three at the back over cellars. The domestic doorways are round-headed with Tuscan quarter-columns, plain lintels, and semicircular fanlights. Between them is a round-headed lobby doorway. The windows are sashes with wedge lintels.	II
40 Chaddock Street; 53.75558°N 2.69889°W	—	c. 1840	A brick house with sandstone dressings and slate roofs in Georgian style. It is in two storeys with a cellar, and has a two-bay front. The round-headed doorway has set-in Tuscan quarter-columns, a plain lintel, and a semicircular fanlight. The windows have wedge lintels, and there is a lobby door to the left.	II
41–44 Chaddock Street; 53.75569°N 2.69903°W	—	c. 1840	A row of four houses in pairs. They are brick with sandstone dressings and slate roofs in Georgian style. The houses are in two storeys with cellars, and each pair has a lobby entrance in the centre. The domestic doorways are round-headed with Tuscan quarter-columns, plain lintels, and semicircular fanlights. The windows are sashes; they and the lobby doorways have wedge lintels.	II
49 Chaddock Street; 53.75330°N 2.70468°W	—	c. 1840	A brick house with sandstone dressings and slate roofs in Georgian style. It is in two storeys with a cellar and an attic. Four bays and two gables face Chaddock Street, and there is one bay on the Cross Street front. The round-headed doorway has engaged Tuscan columns with a cornice and a semicircular fanlight. The windows have wedge lintels, and most are sashes.	II
7 East Cliff; 53.75330°N 2.70468°W	—	c. 1840	A brick house with sandstone dressings and a slate roof. It is in three storeys with a basement and has a three-bay front with a set-back single-bay wing. The round-headed entrance is on the west side, and on the south front is a canted bay window. Almost all the windows are sashes.	II
5 and 6 Fishergate Hill; 53.75618°N 2.71049°W	—	c. 1840	A pair of brick houses, later converted into flats, with sandstone dressings and a slate roof. They are in two storeys with cellars and attics, and each house has a two-bay front. The doorways have engaged Ionic columns with an entablature a cornice, and a moulded lintel. The windows are sashes with wedge lintels.	II
36 and 37 Frenchwood Street; 53.75410°N 2.69505°W	—	c. 1840	A pair of brick houses on a rendered plinth with sandstone dressings and slate roofs. They are in two storeys with cellars. No. 36 has three bays, and No. 37 has two. The doorcases have moulded architraves with dentilled cornices on consoles, and fanlights. The windows are sashes.	II
46 and 47 Frenchwood Street; 53.75460°N 2.69576°W	—	c. 1840	A pair of brick houses with sandstone dressings and slate roofs in Georgian style. They are in two storeys with cellars, and together have three bays. The doorways are in the centre with a lobby door between; their architraves have set-in Tuscan quarter-columns, plain lintels, and semicircular fanlights. The windows have wedge lintels.	II
5, 6 and 7 Latham Street; 53.75465°N 2.69730°W	—	c. 1840	A row of three houses with sandstone dressings and a slate roof. They are in two storeys with cellars, and each house has a two-bay front. The doorways have engaged Tuscan columns, plain friezes and moulded cornices. Most of the windows are sashes with wedge lintels.	II
9, 10 and 11 Latham Street; 53.75447°N 2.69701°W	—	c. 1840	A row of three houses with sandstone dressings and a slate roof. They are in two storeys with cellars, and have two- and three-bay fronts. The doorways have elliptical heads, engaged Tuscan columns, cornices, and fanlights. Between No. 9 and No. 10 is a lobby doorway. The windows have wedge lintels.	II
22 and 23 Ribblesdale Place; 53.75472°N 2.70172°W	—	c. 1840	A pair of brick houses with sandstone dressings and slate roofs. They are in two storeys with cellars and attics. No. 22 faces west and has a front of two bays with a gable; No. 23 faces south and has four bays. Both have doorways with engaged Ionic columns, a plain frieze, a moulded cornice, and a semi-circular fanlight. No. 23 also has a single-storey canted bay window. The windows are sashes with wedge lintels.	II
1–5 St Ignatius Square; 53.76337°N 2.69722°W	—	c. 1840	A row of five houses with sandstone dressings and a slate roof. They are in two storeys with cellars, and each house has a two-bay front. The doorways have moulded architraves and cornices on consoles.	II
48 West Cliff; 53.75375°N 2.70985°W	—	c. 1840	A brick house on a stone plinth with sandstone dressings and a slate roof. It is in two storeys with cellars and an attic, and has a symmetrical three-bay front, with a single-bay wing on each side. Four steps lead up to a doorway with engaged Ionic columns, an entablature with a cornice, and a fanlight. The windows are sashes with wedge lintels.	II
St Andrew's Vicarage; 53.76861°N 2.73572°W	—	c. 1840	The vicarage is built in sandstone with a slate roof. It is in two storeys, and has a symmetrical three-bay front. The windows are mullioned. At the rear is a central gable and a single-storey canted bay window.	II
St Wilfrid's Presbytery (part); 53.75691°N 2.70234°W		c. 1840	Originally a pair of houses, later incorporated in the presbytery. They are in brick with sandstone dressings and a slate roof. The houses are in three storeys with cellars, and each house has a three-bay front. The doorways are approached up four steps and have moulded architraves, dentilled cornices on consoles, and rectangular fanlights. The windows are sashes, those in the middle storey with cast iron balconies. The railings in front of the cellar areas are included in the listing.	II
Gate, gate piers and walls, St Mary's Churchyard; 53.76133°N 2.68609°W	—	c. 1840	The gate piers and walls around the churchyard of St Mary's Church are in sandstone. The gate piers are panelled with a square plan, have plain caps and shallow pyramidal tops, and are about 3 metres (9.8 ft) high. The gates are ramped and the railings have spear heads.	II
30, 32 and 34 St Austin's Road; 53.75620°N 2.69216°W	—	1840–45	A row of three houses with sandstone dressings and a slate roof. They are in two storeys with cellars, and have one- and two-bay fronts. The doorways have round heads, engaged Tuscan quarter-columns, plain lintels, and fanlights. The windows have wedge lintels.	II
38–44 St Austin's Place, 36 St Austin's Road; 53.75603°N 2.69207°W	—	1840–50	A terrace of five brick houses on a stone plinth with sandstone dressings and slate roofs. They are in two storeys with cellars; each house in St Austin's Place has a two-bay front, and No. 36 St Austin's Road has three bays. The doorways have moulded architraves, and cornices on consoles.	II
32, 33 and 34 St Ignatius Square; 53.76392°N 2.69613°W	—	1840–47	A row of three houses with sandstone dressings and a slate roof. They are in two storeys with cellars, and each house has a two-bay front. The doorways have moulded architraves and cornices on consoles. The windows have wedge lintels with keystones.	II
35–40 St Ignatius Square; 53.76363°N 2.69599°W	—	1840–47	A row of six brick houses with sandstone dressings and a slate roof. They are in two storeys with cellars, and each house has a two- or three-bay front. The doorways have moulded architraves and cornices on consoles. The windows have wedge lintels with keystones.	II
St Andrew's School; 53.76903°N 2.73662°W	—	1842	The school is built in sandstone with slate roofs, and was extended by the addition of a cross-wing in 1869. It is in a single storey, and is in Romanesque style. The doorway and most of the windows are round-headed, with one rectangular window in the later wing.	II
42 West Cliff; 53.75400°N 2.71021°W	—	Early 1840s (probable)	A brick house, later used as offices, with sandstone dressings and slate roofs. It is in two storeys with a basement and attics, and has a four-bay front. There is a single-bay, three-storey extension to the left. The doorway has panelled pilasters with foliated caps, and an entablature with a dentilled cornice. Above this is an ornamental cast iron balcony in front of a window with a moulded architrave.	II
54 and 56 West Cliff; 53.75351°N 2.70948°W	—	Early 1840s (probable)	A pair of brick houses on a stone plinth with sandstone dressings and slate roofs. They are in two storeys with cellars and attics. Each house has a three-bay front, and a single-bay wing at each end. The doorways have panelled square pilasters, a frieze with rosettes, and a cornice. The windows are sashes. The attics have dormers of different types.	II
Building 32, Fulwood Barracks; 53.77915°N 2.68794°W	—	1842–48	A building attached to the perimeter wall of the barracks used for storage. It is constructed in sandstone and has a slate roof. The building is in a single storey, with a symmetrical nine-bay front. There are central and outer doorways with fanlights, and the windows are sashes.	II
Building 37, Fulwood Barracks; 53.77849°N 2.68759°W	—	1842–48	A building attached to the perimeter wall of the barracks used for storage. It is constructed in sandstone and has a slate roof. The building is in a single storey, with a symmetrical nine-bay front. There is a central doorway with a fanlight, and the windows are sashes.	II
Former Armoury, Fulwood Barracks; 53.77845°N 2.68512°W	—	1842–48	Built as a detention block, and later used as an armoury, it is constructed in sandstone with a slate roof. The building is in two storeys, and has a seven-bay front. It contains a range of small cell windows, the other windows being sashes.	II
Former Artillery Block, Fulwood Barracks; 53.78022°N 2.68792°W	—	1842–48	The former artillery block is built in sandstone with a slate roof, and is in Georgian style. It is in two storeys and has a front of 29 bays. There are twelve doorways, and some of the original sash windows have been replaced by casements.	II
Former Cavalry Block, Fulwood Barracks; 53.78049°N 2.68596°W	—	1842–48	The former cavalry block is built in sandstone with a slate roof, and is in Georgian style. It is in two storeys and has a front of 28 bays. There are twelve doorways, and some of the original sash windows have been replaced by casements.	II
Former Infantry Block, Fulwood Barracks; 53.77887°N 2.68738°W	—	1842–48	The former infantry block is built in sandstone with a slate roof, and is in Georgian style. It is in two storeys, and has a front of 38 bays. The block is divided into five sections, each with a central doorway. Some of the original sash windows have been replaced by casements.	II
Former Officers' Quarters and Mess, Fulwood Barracks; 53.77970°N 2.68673°W	—	1842–48	The former officers' quarters and mess are built in sandstone with a slate roof, and are in Georgian style. The building consists of a long rectangular range, with slightly larger blocks at the ends containing the messes. These blocks are in six bays, and the quarters between extend for 28 bays. They are in two storeys with basements, the latter for the servants, with steps leading up to the officers' doorways. Some of the original sash windows have been replaced by casements.	II
Racquet Court, Fulwood Barracks; 53.77808°N 2.68742°W	—	1842–48	The racquet court is built in sandstone, and consists of an open court and a heated room at the rear. The court is roofless, and has raking side walls with a round-arched doorway in the rear wall.	II
South Gate, Chapel, Offices and Museum, Fulwood Barracks; 53.77824°N 2.68612°W		1842–48	The entrance block is built in sandstone with a slate roof, and is in Georgian style. It is in two storeys, the central section having five bays, and the lateral ranges each with eight bays. In the centre is a segmental archway flanked by narrow round archways with, on the internal front, a pediment containing a clock, and a cupola with louvres, a domed top and a weathervane. Above the archway is a chapel. The windows are sashes. Part of the west range has been converted into a museum.	II
12–15 Cross Street; 53.75622°N 2.69981°W	—	Early to mid 1840s	A row of four brick houses with sandstone dressings and a slate roof, later used as offices. They are in two storeys with cellars, and each house has a two-bay front. The doorways have Tuscan semi-columns, plain friezes and moulded cornices. Each house also has a lobby doorway. The windows have wedge lintels, and most are sashes.	II
Canteen, Fulwood Barracks; 53.77811°N 2.68707°W	—	1843–48	The canteen is built in sandstone with a slate roof. It is in two storeys, and has a front of six bays. Steps lead up to the entrances, and the windows are flat-headed.	II
Former Horse Infirmary, Fulwood Barracks; 53.78098°N 2.68834°W	—	1843–48	The former horse infirmary, later used as a store, is built in sandstone with a slate roof. It is in a single storey, and has a front of five bays. The doorways and windows have been altered.	II
Northern perimeter wall, Fulwood Barracks; 53.78108°N 2.68783°W	—	1843–48	The wall is built in sandstone and extends for about 150 metres (492 ft) along the north side of the perimeter. It contains blocked rifle holes. There is a projecting corner at the northwest.	II
South perimeter wall, Fulwood Barracks; 53.77824°N 2.68531°W	—	1843–48	The wall is built in sandstone and extends for about 50 metres (164 ft) along the south side of the perimeter. It contains blocked rifle holes.	II
Southwest perimeter wall, Fulwood Barracks; 53.77876°N 2.68780°W	—	1843–48	The wall is built in sandstone and extends for about 200 metres (656 ft) along the southwest side of the perimeter. It contains blocked rifle holes.	II
Charnley House; 53.75530°N 2.70088°W	—	1844	A brick house with sandstone dressings and a slate roof, later used as offices. It is in two storeys with cellars and an attic and has a symmetrical five-bay front. The central porch has two Ionic columns and pilasters, and the doorway has an elliptical fanlight. The windows are sashes with wedge lintels.	II
Former Hospital, Fulwood Barracks; 53.78104°N 2.68625°W	—	1844	The former hospital is built in sandstone with a hipped slate roof, and is in Georgian style. It is in two sections, one for the cavalry, and the other for the infantry; each section has a rear pavilion. The building is in two storeys and has a front of 14 bays. There is an entrance in the centre of both sections.	II
Starkie House; 53.75538°N 2.70061°W	—	1844	Originally a house, later used as an office, it is in brick with sandstone dressings and a slate roof. It is in two storeys with a basement and an attic. There are four bays on Winckley Square, and three on Starkie Street. The doorway on Winckley Square has an architrave with pilasters, and a fanlight. On the Starkie Street front is a doorway with two Ionic columns, a dentilled cornice, a plain frieze, and a moulded cornice. The windows are sashes with wedge lintels.	II
Stephen Simpson Limited; 53.75615°N 2.69871°W	—	1844	An office and works making gold thread and plate, in brick with sandstone dressings and slate roofs. It originated with two two-storey houses, then in 1865 a three-storey house to the right was incorporated. In 1935 a three-storey extension was built. In the older sections the windows have stone surrounds and are mainly sashes. The 1935 section has metal-framed windows. At the rear is a factory.	II
Brookhouse Mill; 53.76750°N 2.71987°W		1844–45	A former cotton spinning mill, built in brick with sandstone dressings. It is in two blocks. The original block has four storeys and has a front of 14 bays; the later block has five storeys and a six-bay front. The windows have wedge lintels and both blocks have stair towers. Inside are cast iron columns and timber floors.	II
26–32 St Austin's Place, 35 St Austin's Road; 53.75623°N 2.69167°W	—	c. 1845–50	A terrace of five houses with sandstone dressings and slate roofs. They are in two storeys with cellars, and have fronts of two or one bay. The doorways have moulded architraves and cornices on consoles.	II
6–15 St Ignatius Square; 53.76373°N 2.69738°W	—	c. 1845–50	A row of town houses on a stone plinth with sandstone dressings and slate roofs. They are in two storeys with cellars, and each house has a two-bay front. The doorways have moulded architraves and cornices on consoles. Most of the windows are sashes. those in the ground floor with wedge lintels.	II
38 and 39 Frenchwood Street; 53.75420°N 2.69519°W	—	Mid 1840s	A pair of brick houses with sandstone dressings and a slate roof. They are in two storeys with cellars, and each house has a two-bay front. The doorways are coupled with moulded architraves, dentilled cornices, and a fanlight. The windows, some of which are sashes, have wedge lintels.	II
Gamull Lane Railway Station; 53.78273°N 2.65871°W		Mid 1840s (probable)	The station was built for the Preston and Longridge Railway and incorporated a station master's house and a booking office; it was later converted into a house. The building is built in Longridge stone with a tiled roof, it is in two storeys and has a five-bay front. The windows are sashes.	II
9–18 Broadgate; 53.75305°N 2.71610°W	—	1840s	A terrace of ten houses in brick on a sandstone plinth with sandstone dressings and slate roofs in late Georgian style. They are in two storeys with cellars and each house has a two-bay front. The doorways are elliptical-arched with set-in quarter-columns, a frieze, a cornice, and a fanlight. The windows, some of which are sashes, have wedge lintels.	II
12 Latham Street; 53.75438°N 2.69686°W	—	1840s	A brick house with sandstone dressings and a slate roof. It is in two storeys with a cellar and an attic that was added later, and has a two-bay front. The doorway has a panelled pilaster architrave, a cornice on consoles, and a fanlight. The window to the right has a similar surround. The attic is rendered and contains two pedimented dormers. All the windows are sashes.	II
6 East Cliff; 53.75345°N 2.70441°W	—	1846	Originally a rectory, later used as a hostel, it is built in sandstone with a slate roof, and is in the style of the 17th century. The building is in two storeys with a basement and attic, and has a projecting wing to the left. The roof is steeply pitched with tall chimneys. Some of the windows are mullioned, some are tramsomed, and others are lancets. Other features include coped gables, one with an apex cross.	II
34 Ribblesdale Place; 53.75442°N 2.69940°W	—	1846	A brick house with sandstone dressings and a slate roof. It has a trapezoidal plan, is in two storeys with cellars, and has a symmetrical three-bay front. The central doorway has engaged Ionic columns with a plain frieze, a moulded cornice, and an elliptical fanlight. The windows are sashes with wedge lintels. The railings in front of the cellar area are included in the listing.	II
35 and 36 Ribblesdale Place; 53.75443°N 2.69924°W	—	c. 1846	A pair of brick houses, later used as offices, with sandstone dressings and a slate roof. They are in two storeys with cellars, and have a symmetrical front with coupled doorways. These have three engaged Ionic columns with a plain frieze, a moulded cornice, and elliptical fanlights. Flanking these are two-storey, canted bay windows containing sashes. Above the doorways is an inscribed plaque.	II
Bridge over former Longridge Railway; 53.76625°N 2.69582°W	—	c. 1846	The bridge carries St Paul's Road over the former Preston and Longridge Railway. It is in sandstone with a brick parapet, and consists of a segmental arch with a keystone.	II
Bridge over former Longridge Railway; 53.76689°N 2.69170°W	—	1846 (probable)	The bridge carries Deepdale Road over the former Preston and Longridge Railway. It is in sandstone, and consists of a segmental arch with voussoirs, a keystone, and a coped parapet.	II
Tunnel Portal; 53.76612°N 2.69720°W		c. 1846	The tunnel was built for the Preston and Longridge Railway. The portal is constructed in sandstone with a brick parapet. It consists of a horseshoe arch with rusticated voussoirs and a large scrolled keystone, and is flanked by pilasters.	II
North bridge, Avenham and Miller Park; 53.75306°N 2.70325°W		c. 1846	A bridge built for the Preston and Blackburn Railway over a path between the parks. It is constructed in sandstone and is in Neoclassical style. The bridge consists of a single slightly skewed elliptical arch with rusticated voussoirs and pilasters, and it has a balustraded parapet with a central shield.	II
South bridge, Avenham and Miller Park; 53.75172°N 2.70269°W	—	c. 1846	The bridge crosses the walk by the River Ribble, linking the railway embankment with the viaduct crossing the river. It was built for the Preston and Blackburn Railway in brick with sandstone dressings, and consists of a single round-headed arch. Alongside is a flight of steps leading from the walkway up to the viaduct.	II
All Saints Church; 53.76326°N 2.70107°W	—	1846–48	The church was designed by John Latham, and is in Neoclassical style. A polygonal chancel was added in 1863. The façade is in sandstone and the rest of the church is in brick with sandstone dressings and a slate roof. It has a portico of six giant unfluted Ionic columns under a pediment. Along the sides are round-arched windows, and at the west end is a timber bellcote.	II
Harris Institute; 53.75457°N 2.69896°W		1846–49	Originally the Preston Institution for the Diffusion of Useful Knowledge, and since has had various uses. It was designed by John Welch in Neoclassical style. It is built in sandstone ashlar, is in two storeys with a basement storey, and has a symmetrical three-bay front. The front has a portico approached by a flight of steps, which is flanked by three-light bay windows.	II*
19, 20 and 21 Ribblesdale Place; 53.75482°N 2.70176°W	—	Late 1840s	A row of three brick houses, later used as offices, with sandstone dressings and slate roofs. They are in two storeys with cellars, and each house has a two-bay front. Four steps lead up to the doorways, each of which has engaged Ionic columns, a plain frieze, a moulded cornice, and a semicircular fanlight. The windows are sashes with wedge lintels.	II
Talbot Library; 53.76357°N 2.71526°W	—	1847–49	This originated as the Talbot Roman Catholic Primary School, and was designed by J. A. Hansom in Early English style. It was later converted into a library and parish rooms. The building is in sandstone with slate roofs, and has an L-shaped plan. It is in a single storey, and has a front of 15 bays. In the centre is a 1 1/2-storey porch with an octagonal stair turret to the right. The bays are divided by buttresses, and each bay contains a pair of lancet windows.	II
Stephenson Terrace; 53.76426°N 2.69069°W		1847–53	A long terrace of sandstone houses with slate roofs. They are in two storeys with attics, and have a total frontage of 48 bays. Eight bays in the centre and four bays at the ends project forward and have attics, and above the centre is a panel inscribed "STEPHENSON TERRACE". All the doorways have Tuscan columns and pilasters with entablatures, and some houses have bay windows. The other windows have moulded architraves; some are sashes, others are altered.	II
Cuerden Place; 53.75447°N 2.69742°W	—	1848	A terrace of seven brick houses with sandstone dressings and slate roofs. They are in two storeys with cellars, and each house has a two-bay front. The doorways have Tuscan doorcases. The windows are sashes with wedge lintels.	II
40 and 41 Frenchwood Street; 53.75437°N 2.69543°W	—	c. 1850	A pair of brick houses on a plinth with sandstone dressings and slate roofs. They are in two storeys with cellars, and each house has a two-bay front. The doorcases have moulded architraves with dentilled cornices on consoles, and fanlights. The windows have wedge lintels.	II
42 and 43 Frenchwood Street; 53.75446°N 2.69555°W	—	c. 1850	A pair of brick houses with sandstone dressings and slate roofs in Georgian style. They are in two storeys with cellars, and each house has a two-bay front. The doorways are coupled with a lobby door between; they have architraves with set-in Tuscan quarter-columns, a frieze, a cornice, and fanlights. The ground floor windows have wedge lintels.	II
3–6 Starkie Street; 53.75486°N 2.70002°W	—	c. 1850	A terrace of four houses on a plinth with sandstone dressings and slate roofs. They are in two storeys with cellars, and each house has a two-bay front. The doorways are coupled, each with three engaged Ionic columns and a continuous entablature with a cornice. In the centre of the terrace is a lobby doorway. The windows, some of which are sashes, have wedge lintels. In front of Nos. 5 and 6 are ornamental railings that are included in the listing.	II
22 Winckley Square; 53.75535°N 2.70232°W	—	c. 1850	A brick house with sandstone dressings and a hipped slate roof. It is in three storeys with a basement, there is a front of three bays and a long rear extension. Four steps lead up to a doorway that has a moulded architrave, a dentilled cornice on consoles, and a fanlight. The windows are sashes with architraves, three of which have dentilled cornices on consoles, and one has a pediment. At the rear are timber canted oriel windows.	II
Wellington Terrace; 53.76296°N 2.71954°W	—	c. 1850	A terrace of 14 brick houses with sandstone dressings and slate roofs. They are in three storeys with basements, and most houses have a front of two bays. Before the basement areas are railings, and each doorway is approached by a bridge of four steps. The doorways have moulded surrounds and cornices on consoles. The windows in the lower two storeys have wedge lintels, and most are sashes.	II
66 and 68 West Cliff; 53.75307°N 2.70884°W	—	c. 1850	A pair of brick houses with sandstone dressings and slate roofs. They are in two storeys with basements, and each house has a symmetrical three-bay front. The central doorways have doorcases with panelled pilasters, and a cornice on coupled consoles. The windows are sashes.	II
1, 2 and 3 Bank Parade; 53.75390°N 2.69502°W	—	Mid 19th century	A row of three brick houses with sandstone dressings and a slate roof. They are in two storeys with basements, and each house has a three-bay front. Nos. 1 and 2 have single-storey canted bay windows, and doorcases with engaged Ionic columns, entablatures, and cornices. No. 3 has a two-storey bay window and a 19th-century porch with panelled square columns, pilasters, and an entablature. The windows, some of which are sashes, have wedge lintels.	II
4 Bank Parade; 53.75383°N 2.69530°W	—	Mid 19th century	A brick house with sandstone dressings and a slate roof. It is in three storeys with a basement, and has a front of two bays. Steps lead up to a doorway with Ionic columns, an entablature, a cornice, and a fanlight. To the left of this is a two-storey canted bay window surmounted by ornamental wrought iron railings. A tunnel leads under the road to a garden bordered by railings with urn finials, which are included in the listing.	II
1 and 3–8 Broadgate; 53.75346°N 2.71608°W	—	Mid 19th century	A public house and a terrace of houses in brick with Welsh slate roofs in two storeys. The public house has paired pilasters and an entablature; the houses have panelled pilasters and moulded cornices on brackets. Nos. 3, 7 and 8 have canted bay windows. The windows are a mix of sashes and casements.	II
13 Latham Street; 53.75433°N 2.69679°W	—	Mid 19th century	A brick house with sandstone dressings and a Welsh slate roof. It is in two storeys with a cellar, and has a front of two bays. The doorway has inset half-columns, a frieze, and a moulded flat hood, above which is a shaped panel. To the left is a lobby door, and the windows are inserted casements.	II
17 Ribblesdale Place; 53.75512°N 2.70222°W	—	Mid 19th century	A brick house with sandstone dressings and a slate roof. It is in three storeys with a basement, and has a front of three bays. In the first bay is a porch with four Tuscan columns on pedestals, a frieze, and a moulded cornice. Behind this is a round-headed doorway with a fanlight. To the right of the porch, the basement well is protected by a stone wall.	II
30–33 Ribblesdale Place; 53.75446°N 2.69966°W	—	Mid 19th century	A row of four houses, some later used as offices, in brick on a stone plinth with sandstone dressings and a slate roof. They are in two storeys with cellars, and each house has a front of two bays. The doorways have engaged Ionic columns, a frieze, a moulded cornice, and a fanlight. The windows are sashes with wedge lintels. In front of the cellar area are ornamental cast iron railings that are included in the listing.	II
7 and 8 Spring Bank; 53.75653°N 2.71191°W	—	Mid 19th century	A pair of brick houses with sandstone dressings and a slate roof. They are in two storeys with cellars. No. 7 has a front of three bays, and No. 8 has two. Both houses have single-storey canted bay windows, and doorways with Tuscan pilasters, dentilled entablatures, cornices, and fanlights. The windows are sashes.	II
22–27 St Ignatius Square; 53.76430°N 2.69632°W	—	Mid 19th century	A row of six brick houses on a stone plinth with sandstone dressings and a slate roof. They are in two storeys with cellars. The doorways are coupled and have moulded architraves and cornices on consoles. There is a lobby doorway in the centre. The windows have wedge lintels.	II
28 and 29 St Ignatius Square; 53.76413°N 2.69623°W	—	Mid 19th century	A pair of brick houses on a stone plinth with sandstone dressings and a slate roof. They are in two storeys with cellars. The doorways are in the centre, with a lobby doorway between them; these have moulded architraves and cornices on consoles. The windows, some of which are sashes, have wedge lintels.	II
30 and 31 St Ignatius Square; 53.76405°N 2.69619°W	—	Mid 19th century	A pair of brick houses on a stone plinth with sandstone dressings and a slate roof. They are in two storeys with cellars. The doorways are in the centre, with a lobby doorway between them; these have moulded architraves and cornices on consoles.	II
38 West Cliff; 53.75419°N 2.71049°W	—	Mid 19th century	A house, later used as an office, in brick with sandstone dressings and a slate roof. It is in two storeys with a basement and attics, and has a symmetrical front of five bays. In the centre is a porch with panelled square columns and pilasters, a dentilled entablature, an egg-and-dart frieze, and a parapet. The windows are sashes with wedge lintels and keystones.	II
72, 74 and 76 West Cliff; 53.75282°N 2.70848°W	—	Mid 19th century	A terrace of three brick houses with a Welsh slate roof. They are in two storeys with attics, and each house has a front of two bays. Every house has a stone doorcase with pilasters, an entablature, and a moulded cornice. The windows in the front and gabled sides of the house are sashes. In the attic are dormers with casement windows.	II
Bank House; 53.75385°N 2.69599°W	—	Mid 19th century	A brick house with sandstone dressings and a slate roof. It is in two storeys with a basement, and has a front of three bays. In the centre is a doorway with engaged Ionic columns, an entablature, a cornice, and a fanlight. To the right is a single-storey canted bay window. The windows are sashes with wedge lintels.	II
George Hotel and shop 53.76061°N 2.69179°W	—	Mid 19th century	The buildings are in brick, the hotel being stuccoed. They are in three storeys with cellars. The hotel has a symmetrical three-bay front, and has a central doorway with a moulded architrave and a cornice. The attached former shop is in two bays, and has a carriage entrance in the left bay. The windows are sashes.	II
Hosiery House; 53.75991°N 2.70667°W		Mid 19th century (probable)	A sandstone building with a slate roof that probably originated as a warehouse. It is in three storeys with an attic, and has a front of nine bays. On the west face are a blocked segmental wagon entry, and a rectangular doorway with a loading bay above.	II
Lamb Hotel and attached shop 53.76080°N 2.69124°W		Mid 19th century (probable)	A public house and attached shop in stuccoed brick with sandstone dressings and slate roofs in three storeys. The hotel has a symmetrical three-bay front with a central doorway over which is a semicircular oriel window. The windows in the hotel and in the shop are sashes.	II
Street lamp standard, Avenham Walk; 53.75348°N 2.69697°W	—	Mid 19th century (probable)	The street lamp standard is in cast iron. It stands on a square pedestal, has a fluted shaft decorated with acanthus leaves, and a gadrooned cap.	II
Street lamp standard, Avenham Walk; 53.75408°N 2.69820°W	—	Mid 19th century (probable)	The street lamp standard is in cast iron. It stands on a square pedestal, has a fluted shaft decorated with acanthus leaves, and a gadrooned cap.	II
Street lamp standard, Avenham Walk; 53.75346°N 2.69716°W	—	Mid 19th century (probable)	The street lamp standard is in cast iron. It stands on a square pedestal, has a fluted shaft decorated with acanthus leaves, and a gadrooned cap.	II
Street lamp standard, Avenham Walk; 53.75396°N 2.69763°W	—	Mid 19th century (probable)	The street lamp standard is in cast iron. It stands on a square pedestal, has a fluted shaft decorated with acanthus leaves, and a gadrooned cap.	II
Street lamp standard, Avenham Walk; 53.75382°N 2.69788°W	—	Mid 19th century (probable)	The street lamp standard is in cast iron. It stands on a square pedestal, has a fluted shaft decorated with acanthus leaves, and a gadrooned cap.	II
Street lamp standard, Avenham Walk; 53.75424°N 2.69815°W	—	Mid 19th century (probable)	The street lamp standard is in cast iron. It stands on a square pedestal, has a fluted shaft decorated with acanthus leaves, and a gadrooned cap.	II
Street lamp standard, Bushell Place; 53.75408°N 2.69781°W	—	Mid 19th century (probable)	The street lamp standard is in cast iron. It stands on a square pedestal, has a fluted shaft decorated with acanthus leaves, and a gadrooned cap. On the cap is a bracket carrying a suspended light fitting.	II
Street lamp standard, Porter Place; 53.75372°N 2.69725°W	—	Mid 19th century (probable)	The street lamp standard is in cast iron. It stands on a square pedestal, has a fluted shaft decorated with acanthus leaves, and a gadrooned cap. On the cap is a bracket carrying a suspended light fitting.	II
Church of St. Walburge; 53.76304°N 2.71484°W		1850–54	A Roman Catholic church designed by Joseph Hansom. The tower was completed in about 1857, and the very tall spire was added in 1867. The body of the church is in sandstone with a slate roof, and the steeple is in limestone. The nave has a steeply pitched roof, and an apse added in 1872. On the west front is a large rose window. Inside the church is a hammer beam roof.	I
11 Church Street, 2 and 4 Lancaster Road; 53.75866°N 2.69727°W		1850–60	Shops with dwellings above, built in brick with sandstone dressings. No. 11 Church Street has three storeys, and the shops in Lancaster Road have four, but the buildings are of the same height. In the ground floor are shop fronts, and above are sash windows.	II
2–8 Regent Street; 53.75496°N 2.69952°W	—	1850–60	A row of seven brick houses with sandstone dressings and slate roofs. They are in two storeys with cellars, and each house has a two- or three-bay front. All the doorways have moulded architraves, with dentilled cornices on consoles, and fanlights. The windows, some of which are sashes, have wedge lintels.	II
39–57 West Cliff; 53.75426°N 2.70974°W	—	1850–60	A terrace of ten houses. They are in three storeys with cellars, and each house has a two-bay front. The ground floor is in sandstone, the upper parts are in brick (one rendered) with sandstone dressings and slate roofs. Some of the houses have first-floor ornamental cast iron balconies, and most of the windows are sashes.	II
Coach house and stables, Ashton Lodge; 53.76595°N 2.74035°W	—	1851	The former coach house and stables are in sandstone with slate roofs. They are in three blocks, all with two storeys, on three sides of a yard. The west block is symmetrical, in three bays, and has a square-headed archway flanked by wide pilasters, above which is an open pediment containing a shield. In the upper floor are round-headed windows. The other block have wagon archways, the north block also having a pediment, round-headed windows, and pitch holes.	II
Statue of Sir Robert Peel; 53.75608°N 2.70090°W		1852	The statue of Sir Robert Peel was designed by Thomas Duckett, and is in limestone. Sir Robert stands on a tall, tapering pedestal, with his left hand on a rock. He is dressed in a top coat and trousers. On the pedestal is an inscription.	II
Zoar Chapel; 53.75517°N 2.69969°W	—	1853	The chapel was built for the Particular Baptists. It is constructed in brick with sandstone dressings and a slate roof. The entrance front facing the street is in three bays with a gable and brick pilasters. The central doorway has a moulded architrave and a cornice on consoles, and contains double doors. Above it is a sash window, and flanking it are tall multi-paned windows.	II
St John's Minster; 53.75851°N 2.69621°W		1853–55	The church replaced an earlier church on the site, and was designed by E. H. Shellard in Decorated style. It is built in sandstone with slate roofs. The church consists of a nave, aisles, and a chancel with a chapel and a vestry. At the west end is a steeple with clock faces, gargoyles, pinnacles, and flying buttresses supporting the octagonal spire.	II*
10, 12 and 14 Lancaster Road; 53.75891°N 2.69742°W	—	c. 1854	A row of shops with offices above, in ashlar stone over a brick core, and with slate roofs. They are in three storeys with attics, and have a five-bay front, and are in Neoclassical style. The windows are sashes.	II
16 and 18 Lancaster Road; 53.75907°N 2.69758°W	—	1854	Originally a post office, later used as two shops, it is in ashlar stone over a brick core and has a slate roof. The building has three storeys with attics, a three-bay front, and is in Neoclassical style. In the ground floor are shop fronts under a modillioned cornice. Above is a giant Composite palistrade with a moulded frieze, a modillioned cornice, and a moulded pediment.	II
5 Winckley Square; 53.75704°N 2.70148°W	—	1854–55	A brick house with sandstone dressings and slate roof in the style of an Italian palazzo. It is in three storeys and a basement. The main front is symmetrical in five bays, with a short projecting wing on the right. Above the ground floor is a Vitruvian scroll. The prominent porch has semi-columns with Composite capitals, a prominent cornice, a pierced parapet, and a round-headed archway with a keystone cartouche. The windows are sashes.	II
1 Avenham Terrace; 53.75434°N 2.69499°W	—	1850s	A brick house on a stone plinth with sandstone dressings and a slate roof in Georgian style. It is in two storeys with a cellar, and has a single bay on Frenchwood Street, and two on Avenham Place. The doorway has engaged Ionic columns with an entablature and a cornice.	II
29 Frenchwood Street, 1 and 2 Avenham Place; 53.75450°N 2.69510°W	—	1850s	Three houses on a stone plinth with sandstone dressings and slate roof. They are in two storeys with cellars. No. 29 Frenchwood Street is on a corner and has three bays on each street front. Its doorcase has engaged Ionic columns. The two houses facing Avenham Place each has a two-bay front, and a doorcase with engaged Tuscan columns.	II
Tower House, Avenham Tower, 15 Avenham Lodge; 53.75345°N 2.69670°W		1850s	A block of three houses in stuccoed brick with sandstone dressings and slate roofs. They are in three storeys with attics and cellars, and incorporate a five-stage tower. There are five bays on Bushell Place and four on Bank Parade. The building has a U-shaped plan, and is in eclectic style. The ornamental railings at the front of the building are included in the listing.	II
Gates and gate piers, St John's Minster; 53.75878°N 2.69609°W	—	c. 1855	A pair of gates and gate piers probably designed by E. H. Shellard. The piers are in sandstone, they are octagonal, about 4 metres (13 ft) high, with a moulded cornice and an embattled cap. The gates are in cast iron.	II
20 and 22 Lancaster Road; 53.75911°N 2.69756°W	—	Mid 1850s (probable)	A commercial building in brick with stucco ornament and a slate roof. It is in Neoclassical style, with three storeys and an attic, and a three-bay front. In the ground floor are modern shop fronts, with a carriage entry to the left. The windows are sashes, and in the roof are two dormers.	II
New Hall Lane Mill; 53.76442°N 2.67628°W	—	1856	A former cotton mill, later adapted for other uses. It is in brick with some sandstone dressings, and has a rectangular plan. The building is in four storeys and has a front of 13 bays. On top of the first bay is a sprinkler tower. There are brick pilasters on each side of the first bay, and at the other end of the building. The windows have segmental heads.	II
St Augustine's Presbytery; 53.75578°N 2.69181°W	—	1856	The presbytery was designed by J. A. Hansom, and was extended in about 1900. It is in brick with sandstone dressings and a hipped slate roof. The building is in three storeys and has a symmetrical three-bay front, with a pediment in the centre. The windows are sashes, those in the middle storey having moulded architraves with cornices, and in the other floors with wedge lintels. The entrance is in a two-storey link on the left.	II
Midland Bank; 53.75772°N 2.70254°W	—	1856–57	Built for the Lancaster Banking Company, the building was designed by J. H. Park in the form of an Italian palazzo. It is in sandstone with a slate roof; it has three storeys and a five-bay front. In the ground floor are five arches, the outer ones containing doorways, and the others windows. The arches have quoined surrounds and mask keystones. The panelled cornice above contains animal heads holding festoons. In the middle floor are round-headed casement windows with pedimented Corinthian architraves, and there are segmental-headed casements in the upper floor. At the top of the building is a dentilled cornice.	II
Amounderness House; 53.76041°N 2.69859°W	—	1857	This was built as a police station and court in Neoclassical style, and was extended in 1901. It is constructed in sandstone with slate roofs, and has two storeys. The original block has a symmetrical five-bay front with a modillioned cornice and a balustraded parapet with ball finials. In the centre is a round-headed doorway with coupled engaged Tuscan columns. The later extension contains a three-stage tower.	II
Stanley Arms Hotel; 53.75921°N 2.69758°W	—	Late 1850s (probable)	A public house in stuccoed brick with a slate roof, and in Neoclassical style. It has three storeys with a cellar, and a symmetrical three-bay front. On the front are two pairs of giant Tuscan pilasters at the top of which is a triglyph frieze and a pediment. The ground floor is rusticated, and has a doorway with a cornice on consoles. The window above has a pediment on consoles.	II
Fishergate Baptist Church; 53.75765°N 2.70509°W		1858	The church was designed by James Hibbert and Nathan Rainford, it is built in sandstone with slate roofs, and is in Italian Romanesque style. The gabled entrance front is symmetrical with central round-headed paired doorways, and four round-headed windows, all with pilasters. Above is a large wheel window flanked by smaller circular windows. On the right is a tower with a doorway and lancet windows and a clock face in the three stages above. Over these are coupled oculi, a cornice, and a pyramidal roof. There is another wheel window at the rear.	II
St Luke's Church; 53.76604°N 2.68359°W		1858–59	The church was designed by E. H. Shellard, and is in Early English style. It is built in sandstone with slate roofs. The church consists of a nave with aisles, and a chancel with a north organ loft and a south vestry. At the southwest is a tower with a broach spire. The church has been converted into flats.	II
Preston Abstinence Memorial; 53.76661°N 2.65998°W	—	1859	The memorial is in Preston Cemetery and commemorates The "Seven Men of Preston", who included Joseph Livesey and other founders of the temperance movement. It is in limestone, and has an octagonal plan on a square base with projecting octagonal corners. The memorial is in three stages and is ornately carved. The top is conical, with lucarnes and a foliate finial.	II
United Reformed Church; 53.75900°N 2.69208°W		1859	This originated as a Congregational church, and was designed by Bellamy and Hardy in Gothic style. It is built in sandstone and has slate roofs. The body of the church is in two storeys. At the west end is a triple doorway with a four-light window above. At the corners are two-stage towers, the left tower being surmounted by an octagonal drum and a spire with lucarnes.	II
Waterstone's Bookshop; 53.75816°N 2.69886°W		1859	Originally a grocer's shop, designed by R. W. Hughes, it was enlarged and refaced in 1915. It is built basically in brick with a façade of sandstone in the ground floor and faience above. The shop is in three storeys, with a front of seven bays on Fishergate, six on Glovers Court, and one canted bay on the corner. The ground floor consists of a continuous arcade of round-headed arches, each arch having a mask keystone and mosaic spandrels. Above the arcade is a pierced parapet. The windows in the upper storeys are round-headed with pilasters between them.	II
11 and 12 Regent Street; 53.75462°N 2.69946°W	—	c. 1860	A pair of brick houses with sandstone dressings and slate roofs. They are in two storeys with cellars, and together have a front of seven bays. In the centre is a lobby doorway. The domestic doorways have moulded architraves, with cornices on consoles, and fanlights. The windows are sashes with wedge lintels.	II
13 and 14 Regent Street; 53.75478°N 2.69963°W	—	c. 1860	A pair of brick houses with sandstone dressings and slate roofs. They are in two storeys with cellars, and each house has a front of three bays. In the centre is a lobby doorway. The domestic doorways have moulded architraves, with cornices on consoles, and fanlights. The windows are sashes with wedge lintels.	II
15 and 16 Regent Street; 53.75494°N 2.69981°W	—	c. 1860	A pair of brick houses with sandstone dressings and slate roofs. They are in two storeys with cellars, and each house has a front of three bays. In the centre is a lobby doorway. The domestic doorways have moulded architraves, with cornices on consoles, and fanlights. The windows have wedge lintels.	II
Golden Cross Hotel; 53.76029°N 2.69812°W	—	c. 1860	A public house in brick, partly stuccoed, with sandstone dressings and a slate roof. It is in Neoclassical style, and has three storeys with an attic and cellar, and a symmetrical three-bay front. Above the ground floor is a cornice carried on large foliated consoles. The windows in the middle storey are casements, the outer ones having pedimented architraves. In the top floor are sash windows.	II
Princes Buildings; 53.76012°N 2.69806°W	—	c. 1860	A terrace of five shops with dwellings above. They are in brick, partly stuccoed, with sandstone dressings and slate roofs, and are in Neoclassical style. The shops have three storeys with cellars and attics, and a front totalling eleven bays. In the ground floor are modern shop fronts, and the windows above are sashes. The first floor windows of Nos. 54 and 58 have pedimented architraves with foliated consoles. Above the ground floor of the others are giant pilasters. At the top of the building is a dentilled cornice, and in the roof are dormers.	II
12, 13 and 14 Bank Parade; 53.75354°N 2.69628°W	—	Mid to late 19th century	A terrace of three sandstone houses with slate roofs. They are in two storeys with cellars and attics, and each house has a two-bay front. The doorways have moulded architraves with cornices on consoles, and fanlights. Each house has a single-storey canted bay window. Most of the windows are sashes, and in the roofs are dormers.	II
3 Latham Street; 53.75475°N 2.69744°W	—	Mid to late 19th century	A brick house with sandstone dressings and a slate roof. It is in two storeys with cellars, and has a four-bay front. The round-headed doorway has an architrave with a dentilled cornice. The windows are sashes.	II
8 Latham Street; 53.75457°N 2.69713°W	—	Mid to late 19th century	A brick house with sandstone dressings and a slate roof. It is in three storeys with cellars, and has a two-bay front. The doorway has a panelled pilaster architrave, and an entablature with a cornice. The windows are sashes, those in the lower two storeys with wedge lintels.	II
9, 10 and 11 Spring Bank; 53.75659°N 2.71161°W	—	Mid to late 19th century	A group of three brick houses with sandstone dressings and slate roofs. They are in two storeys with cellars, and each house has a front of two bays. The doorways of Nos. 9 and 10 are paired. All the doorways have an architrave with a moulded cornice on consoles. The windows, some of which are sashes, have wedge lintels.	II
16–21 St Ignatius Square; 53.76405°N 2.69753°W		Mid to late 19th century	A row of six brick houses on a stone plinth with sandstone dressings and slate roofs. They are in two storeys with cellars, and each house has a front of two bays. The doorways are paired, and have pilastered architraves. The windows, some of which are sashes, have wedge lintels.	II
Former Moor Park Methodist Church; 53.77016°N 2.70492°W		1861–62	Originally a Methodist church, this has been converted, and later used as a mosque. It is built in brick with sandstone dressings, has a slate roof, and is in simplified Italianate style. At the west end is a semicircular portico with round-headed arches carried on square pillars with Composite capitals. Over this is a pediment containing a three-light window with an oculus above. Along the sides of the church are tall round-headed windows.	II
St Mark's Church; 53.76304°N 2.71894°W		1862–63	The church was designed by E. G. Paley, and the tower was added between 1868 and 1870. It is constructed in sandstone with slate roofs, and is in Decorated style. The church consists of a nave, transepts, a chancel with an apse, a porch, and a northeast tower. It is now redundant and has been converted into flats.	II*
English Martyrs' Church; 53.76918°N 2.70456°W		1863–67	This Roman Catholic church is also dedicated to St Thomas of Canterbury. It was designed by E. W. Pugin and extended by him in 1888. The church is built in sandstone and has a slate roof. It consists of a nave, aisles, coupled transepts, and a long chancel with a polygonal apse. At the west end are three pinnacles, the central one corbelled out and containing niches for statues, and a large window in Decorated style.	II
Drinking fountain, Avenham Park; 53.75271°N 2.69832°W	—	c. 1865 (probable)	In sandstone and built into a natural embankment, it has a round-headed arch and a rusticated surround with a keystone. The fountain was built on the site of a natural spring, which dried up, and a water supply was later installed.	II
Fountain, Miller Park; 53.75196°N 2.70398°W		c. 1865 (probable)	The fountain stands in a circular pond in the park. It is constructed in Longridge stone and imitation stone. On a base is a pedestal comprising seated personifications of Earth, Air, Fire, and Water. The fountain is surrounded by a shell-like basin.	II
Terrace steps, balustrade and urns, Miller Park; 53.75228°N 2.70449°W	—	c. 1865	Two winding flights of steps lead from the upper deck of the terrace to the middle deck, and join to form a single flight down to the bottom. These are flanked by walls with balustrades on which are urns. All are in sandstone.	II
Urn, Miller Park; 53.75208°N 2.70495°W	—	c. 1865	The urn is in imitation stone and stands on a sandstone pedestal. The urn is in the shape of a chalice, and is decorated with acanthus leaves, vines, small figures, and handles.	II
Urn, Miller Park; 53.75284°N 2.70381°W	—	c. 1865	The urn is in imitation stone and stands on a sandstone pedestal. The urn is in the shape of a chalice, and is decorated with acanthus leaves, vines, small figures, and handles.	II
Urn, Miller Park; 53.75224°N 2.70467°W	—	c. 1865	The urn is in imitation stone and stands on a sandstone pedestal. The urn is in the shape of a chalice, and is decorated with acanthus leaves, vines, small figures, and handles.	II
Urn, Miller Park; 53.75191°N 2.70525°W	—	c. 1865	The urn is in imitation stone and stands on a sandstone pedestal. The urn is in the shape of a chalice, and is decorated with acanthus leaves, vines, small figures, and handles.	II
Urn, Miller Park; 53.75256°N 2.70412°W	—	c. 1865	The urn is in imitation stone and stands on a sandstone pedestal. The urn is in the shape of a chalice, and is decorated with acanthus leaves, vines, small figures, and handles.	II
Urn, Miller Park; 53.75240°N 2.70440°W	—	c. 1865	The urn is in imitation stone and stands on a sandstone pedestal. The urn is in the shape of a chalice, and is decorated with acanthus leaves, vines, small figures, and handles.	II
Belvedere, Avenham Park; 53.75318°N 2.69705°W		1865–66	This is a gazebo in Neoclassical style, which was moved to its present site in about 1873. It is built in rendered brick with a sandstone façade, and has its back to earth. The structure has a symmetrical seven-bay front, the central bay protruding forward. This has a round-headed arch with Corinthian shafts, a keystone, roundels, and a modillioned cornice. Flanking it are arches with Corinthian columns.	II
Preston Workhouse; 53.77906°N 2.69993°W		1865–68	The workhouse became Sharoe Green Hospital, and was later converted into offices. It was designed by Leigh Hall, and is built in brick with a plinth and dressings of Longridge sandstone, and has a slate roof. The building is in three storeys with cellars, and is in Italianate style. It has a T-shaped plan, consisting of a three-bay entrance front with a clock tower, side wings of 14 bays ending in seven-bay wing pavilions, and a rear wing of 14 bays.	II
Emmanuel Church; 53.76917°N 2.71264°W	—	1868–70	The church was designed by Myres, Veevers and Myres in Gothic Revival style, and has since been altered. It is constructed in red brick with brick decoration in other colours, sandstone dressings, and slate roofs. The church consists of a nave, transepts, a chancel with apsidal vestries, and a southwest tower. The tower has gargoyles, a pierced parapet, and octagonal corner pinnacles.	II
Deepdale Hall; 53.76586°N 2.69307°W		1869–70	This was originally the west wing of Preston Royal Infirmary. It was designed by James Hibbert, and has since been converted into a hall of residence. It is in brick with sandstone dressings and slate roofs. The building is in a long rectangular block, with two storeys and cellars. There are towers at the corners and above the entrance, all with steep pavilion roofs in French style and ornamental iron cresting.	II
15 Latham Street; 53.75424°N 2.69661°W	—	c. 1870–80	A brick house with sandstone dressings and a slate roof. It is in three storeys and has a symmetrical three-bay front. In the centre is a round-headed doorway with a moulded architrave, a fanlight, and a decorated keystone. The windows are sashes. In the ground floor they are triple and round-headed with architraves and keystones; in the middle storey the central window has an architrave with a cornice and consoles.	II
Covered market 53.76055°N 2.69943°W		1870–75	An open market with a hipped slate roof. It has a rectangular plan, with thirteen by three bays. It is carried by cast iron columns with foliated caps standing on square pedestals, and wrought iron ornamented girders.	II
Keep, Fulwood Barracks; 53.77952°N 2.68801°W	—	1870–80	The keep was built as quartermaster's stores. It is in sandstone, and has a flat asphalt roof. The building is in three storeys, with a dentil parapet. On the front the central section is in four bays and is flanked by two three-bay stair towers, the one on the left rising to a greater height than the roof. The windows in the central section are sashes, and in the towers are loops.	II
96 Fishergate; 53.75790°N 2.70304°W	—	1872	A commercial building in sandstone with a slate roof designed by James Hibbert. It is in three storeys and has a four-bay front. In the ground floor is a four-bay arcade that has paired coupled pilasters with palmette capitals, a frieze and a cornice. In the middle floor are sash windows with architraves and pediments, and in the top floor are round-headed windows.	II
St Joseph's Orphanage; 53.75652°N 2.70405°W	—	1872	The orphanage is built in red brick with dressings in blue brick and sandstone and with a Welsh slate roof. It is in High Victorian Gothic style, has an L-shaped plan, and is in two storeys with attics and basements. In the angle is a tower with a pyramidal spire, and containing the entrance. The east wing forms the chapel.	II
Derby Monument; 53.75239°N 2.70467°W		1873	The monument is to the 14th Earl of Derby, who died in 1869, and is by Matthew Noble. The statue of the earl is in white Sicilian marble, and depicts him standing with a scroll in his hand, and his robe draped over a pile of books. The statue stands on a granite pedestal and base. The pedestal has a cornice and carries an inscription.	II
St Joseph's Church; 53.76522°N 2.67922°W		1873–73	A Roman Catholic church designed by J. O'Byrne. It is built in brick with sandstone dressings and a slate roof. The church consists of a nave, aisles, and a sanctuary with gabled side chapels. At the west end is a projecting porch with a vestry to the north. Above the porch are three stepped tall two-light windows, along the sides of the church are triple lancets, and in the sanctuary are five stepped lancets.	II
27 and 28 Frenchwood Street; 53.75461°N 2.69539°W	—	Late 19th century	A pair of brick houses with sandstone dressings and a slate roof. They are in two storeys with cellars, and each house has a two-bay front. The doorways was paired in the centre, and have moulded architraves with dentilled cornices on consoles, and fanlights. The windows are sashes with wedge lintels.	II
Fishergate Bridge; 53.75716°N 2.70772°W		Late 19th century	The bridge carries Fishergate over the railway lines to the north of Preston railway station. It is built in sandstone and cast iron, and has large rectangular piers. The bridge has a parapet of cast iron panels, and on the south side is the entrance to the station.	II
Ornamental lamps, Avenham Walk; 53.75439°N 2.69853°W	—	Late 19th century	Four ornamental lamps, in two pairs, at the north entrance to Avenham Walk. Each lamp stands on a sandstone pedestal, and consists of a cast iron vase pedestal, a gadrooned base, and a shaft with acanthus decoration. The lamps in each pair are joined by a stone wall.	II
Railings, lamps and bollards, Miller Arcade; 53.75843°N 2.69794°W	—	Late 19th century	The two sets of railings, the two lamps and the bollards are in cast iron and wrought iron. They were originally in the centre of the street, and have been relocated to the front of the Miller Arcade. The railings form two rectangular enclosures, which, in their original location, contained steps leading to underground public conveniences.	II
Royal Bank of Scotland; 53.75797°N 2.70262°W	—	Late 19th century	The bank stands on a corner. It is built in ashlar stone on a granite plinth and has a slate roof. Its design is Mannerist. The bank is in two storeys, with a canted bay on the corner containing a round-headed doorway with attached granite columns. The windows are sashes, those in the ground floor having round heads, and those in the upper storey having flat heads and pediments. At the top of the building is a balustraded parapet.	II
1 Lune Street; 53.75790°N 2.70288°W	—	Late 19th century (rebuilt)	A commercial building on a corner site. It is in three storeys, the ground floor being in polished granite, and the upper floors in brick with sandstone dressings; the roof is slated. There are three bays facing Lune Street, and one on Fishergate. The entrance is on the canted corner, and there is a corbel carrying an oriel window in the top floor. Above this is an octagonal turret with round-headed windows and a domed copper cap with a finial.	II
Former Conservative Club; 53.75715°N 2.70007°W	—	1877–78	The club was designed by Garlick, Park and Sykes, and is in free Elizabethan style. It is built in brick with sandstone dressings and has a slate roof. The building is in three storeys with cellars, and has a three-bay front. The central bay is narrower, and contains a doorway, above which is a balustraded balcony and a half-timbered gable. The outer bays have mullioned and transomed windows and pargeting.	II
Preston railway station 53.75624°N 2.70736°W		1879–80	The station was designed by Cooper and Tullis to replace an earlier station. The entrance buildings are in brick with sandstone dressings on a granite plinth, and consist of a central block in two storeys with an attic and a five-bay front containing an arcade of Tuscan columns, flanked by single-storey three-bay wings. Behind are sheds in cast iron and steel with glass roofs. These are supported by decorated cast iron columns.	II
24 Fishergate; 53.75802°N 2.70058°W	—	c. 1880	A stuccoed shop with a slate roof, it has a narrow rectangular plan, with a single bay facing Fishergate, and four bays along Guildhall Street. It is in three storeys, and is in Italianate style. In the ground floor is a modern shop front, and above are pilasters with foliated capitals, and a prominent cornice. The windows are round-headed.	II
14 Latham Street; 53.75429°N 2.69673°W	—	c. 1880	A brick house with sandstone dressings and a slate roof. It is in three storeys with a cellar. The doorway and the two ground floor windows to the right are round-headed and have panelled pilaster architraves with keystones and decorative strips and bands. The windows in the upper floors have similar pilasters. All the windows are sashes.	II
Harris Library, Museum and Art Gallery; 53.75912°N 2.69825°W		1882–93	The building was paid for from a bequest by Edmund Robert Harris, and was designed by James Hibbert. It is built in sandstone, and stands on a plinth in an elevated site in the town centre. The building is in Greek Revival style. In the main front is a giant portico of fluted Ionic columns flanked by three recessed bays with giant pilasters. In the tympanum of the portico is sculpture based on The Age of Pericles.	I
Chapel, school and master's house, Harris Orphanage; 53.78493°N 2.71268°W	—	1884–88	The orphanage was designed by Benjamin Sykes, and paid for from a bequest by Edmund Robert Harris. The listed buildings consist of the chapel, and the school with its combined master's house. They are built in Accrington brick with sandstone dressings and Cumberland slated roofs, and are in Gothic style. The building has an H-plan, the school having a cross-wing at the south, the chapel as a cross-wing to the north with a tower in the angle, and the master's house at the south end of the school.	II
Children's Homes, Harris Orphanage; 53.78531°N 2.71341°W	—	1885–88	Eight houses around a green, designed by Benjamin Sykes, and paid for from a bequest by Edmund Robert Harris. They are built in Accrington brick with sandstone dressings and slated roofs with ridge tiles. They are in Vernacular Revival style, with slight differences between them, and include features such as applied timber-framing, diapering, canted bay windows, and gabled dormers.	II
Lodge, Harris Orphanage; 53.78466°N 2.71202°W	—	1885–88	The lodge at the entrance to the drive was designed by Benjamin Sykes, and paid for from a bequest by Edmund Robert Harris. It is built in brick with sandstone dressings and a Cumberland slate roof, and is in Vernacular Revival style. The gables contain applied timber-framing. The lodge is in a single storey, and has a T-shaped plan. Associated with it are six gate piers and gates; these are included in the listing.	II
Centenary Mill; 53.76149°N 2.68368°W		1891–96	Originally a cotton mill, later used as a warehouse, it is in brick with stone dressings and has a slate roof. It has four storeys and a basement, and a front of 23 bays. There are two stair towers, a sprinkler tower, carding sheds, an engine house, a boiler house and a chimney. To the southeast are a two-storey entrance and office block.	II
Central Conservative Club; 53.75845°N 2.69683°W	—	1893	This was built as a Conservative Working Men's Club, and has been altered for other uses. It is in brick with dressings in terracotta and sandstone, and has a slate roof; it is in Jacobean style. The building has three storeys with a front of three bays. On the corner is a two-storey octagonal oriel window. The windows are mullioned and transomed, and at the top of the building is a balustraded parapet.	II
Miller Arcade; 53.75866°N 2.69807°W		1895	A complex of shops with offices above on an island site, containing shopping arcades in cruciform plan. It is built in brick with terracotta dressings and tiled roofs. The building is in three storeys with cellars, with an attic on the south front. There is an entrance in the centre of each side, the rest of the ground floor consisting of arched shop fronts. Other features include oriel windows in the middle storey on the south front, a larger top-storey oriel on the east front, and rounded corners with corbelled balconies.	II
Black Horse Hotel; 53.75984°N 2.70139°W		1898	A public house was designed by J. A. Seward. It is built in brick on a stone plinth with sandstone dressings and a slate roof, and stands on a corner site. The building is in three storeys, it has three bays on the front facing Friargate, one wide front facing Orchard Street, and a canted bay between them. The stone doorway has an elliptical head with a fanlight, above which is a balustraded balcony. The windows are sashes. The building has a well-preserved interior.	II
Old Black Bull public house 53.76008°N 2.70327°W		c. 1900	The public house was designed by Garlick and Sykes in Tudor style. It is in three storeys with a cellar, and has a symmetrical three-bay front. The ground floor is faced with glazed green terracotta, and the upper storeys, which are slightly jettied, have applied timber framing. In the ground floor is a large elliptical-headed window flanked by doorways. The middle storey has a canted ten-light oriel window, and the gabled top floor contains mullioned windows.	II
Sessions House; 53.75955°N 2.69855°W		1900–03	A court house designed by Henry Littler, it is built in sandstone and is in Baroque style. It is in three storeys with a basement, and all sides are symmetrical. The main front is in 13 bays, with a central four-stage tower. On this front are pairs of Ionic columns, and at the top are pediments and a balustrade. Above the central porch is a balcony, a round-headed window with an elaborate pediment, and an oculus with swags.	II*
Post Office; 53.75960°N 2.69947°W		1901–03	The Post Office was designed by Henry Tanner, and is in a mix of Renaissance and Jacobean styles. It is built in sandstone and has a large rectangular plan. The building is in three storeys with a basement and attic, and the main front is in seven bays. The outer bays project forward and have shaped gables containing Diocletian windows. Most of the other windows are mullioned and transomed. The attached railings are included in the listing.	II
Boer War Memorial, Avenham Park; 53.75357°N 2.70268°W		1904	A memorial to those who were lost in the Boer War designed by T. Hodgkinson. It is in granite, and consists of an obelisk 25 feet (7.6 m) high with inscribed bronze plaques. It was originally in Market Square and probably moved here in 1926.	II
Trustee Saving Bank; 53.75876°N 2.69687°W	—	1905	Built for the Preston Savings Bank, it is built in sandstone on a plinth of polished granite. The bank is in Baroque style, has two storeys, and a six-bay front. The outer bays project forward and contain round-headed doorways with blocked Tuscan columns and an entablature, over each of which is a sash window with a balcony and a segmental pediment. The central bays contain cross-windows in the ground floor, and casement windows with balconies in the upper floor. At the top of the building is a modillioned cornice and a balustraded parapet.	II
Tulketh Mill; 53.77238°N 2.72421°W		1905	A large cotton mill, later adapted for other purposes. It is constructed around cast iron columns and steel beams, has concrete floors, and is clad in red and yellow brick; it has an asphalt roof. The mill is in five storeys, has a rectangular plan of twelve by four bays, with a tower, an office block, a stair turret, and an engine house. The tower is square with pilasters on the corner, and rises two stages above the rest of the mill. In the top stage is an oculus on each side and "TULKETH" in white lettering. On the summit is a squat octagonal tiled spire.	II
Chimney, Tulketh Mill; 53.77214°N 2.72359°W		1905	The tall chimney served a former cotton mill. It is in brick, is cylindrical, and tapers slightly. Near the top in white brick is the word "TULKETH". Around the upper part of the chimney are steel bands, and at the top is a short tile-clad spire.	II
St Michael and All Angels Church; 53.76512°N 2.73145°W	—	1906–08	The church was designed by Austin and Paley in Perpendicular style. It is built in sandstone with tiled roofs. The church consists of a nave and chancel in one cell, aisles, a south chapel, an uncompleted tower, a north transept and a vestry.	II*
Gates, Haslam Park, Blackpool Road; 53.77038°N 2.73203°W	—	1910	Flanking the gates are a pair of stone rusticated gate piers with cornices and large ball finials. The gates are in wrought iron, and consist of a pair of carriage gates, wrought iron standards, and outside these are pedestrian gates.	II
Gates, Haslam Park, Cottam Lane; 53.77038°N 2.73203°W	—	1910	The gates are approached by a flight of 20 steps flanked by sandstone walls. There are rusticated gate piers with prominent corniced caps. Between them are elaborate wrought iron gates, and to the left are smaller gates with cast iron piers.	II
Lamp posts, Haslam Park; 53.77032°N 2.73179°W	—	c. 1910	Two lamp posts in cast iron at the entrance to the park. They consist of cylindrical posts with fluted bases and lanterns.	II
Drinking fountain, Haslam Park; 53.77087°N 2.73363°W		1911	The drinking fountain is in cast iron on a stone base, and is in Gothic style. It consists of an elaborate canopy carried on four fluted columns, and has a domed roof. The canopy is elaborately decorated with motifs including griffons, pelicans in shields, and a coronet. Inside the canopy is a pedestal holding a basin and the fountain.	II
War Memorial, Harris Orphanage; 53.78498°N 2.71256°W	—	c. 1920	The war memorial consists of a pedestal in polished granite carrying a white stone statue of a soldier with a rifle. On the pedestal is an inscription.	II
War Memorial, St Ignatius Church; 53.76339°N 2.69656°W		1922	The War Memorial was designed by J. H. Mangan, and is built in Portland stone. It is 22 feet (6.7 m) high, and is in the form of a Calvary. The memorial has a large plinth on which is a dado with three arched panels containing inscribed bronze plaques. On this is a Crucifix flanked by statues of a soldier and sailor, both mourning.	II
Fish Market; 53.76018°N 2.69983°W		Early 20th century	The fish market has open sides, it has a square plan under a three-span hipped slate roof. The roof is carried on decorated cast iron columns. On the ridges of the roof is wrought iron cresting.	II
98 and 99 Fishergate; 53.75801°N 2.70240°W	—	Early 20th century	A commercial building built in stone and in Neoclassical style. It is in three storeys, and has a front of four bays on Fishergate, three bays on Chapel Walks, and one canted bay in the corner between them. The entrance is in the corner bay and has a cornice and a curved pediment. The windows in the middle storey are sashes with moulded architraves and pediments with keystones. At the top of the building is a cornice and a parapet that is partly balustraded.	II
War Memorial Cenotaph; 53.75944°N 2.69940°W		1926	The cenotaph was designed by Giles Gilbert Scott, and is in Portland stone. It consists of a slightly tapering obelisk 70 feet (21.3 m) high standing on a stepped cruciform plinth. On the south side is a female figure mourning and holding up two wreathes, and on the plinth is an inscription. The cenotaph stands in a garden with bowed ends.	I
Town Hall; 53.75993°N 2.69842°W		1933–34	Built as the Municipal Building, and designed by Arnold Thornely, it became the Town Hall when the original town hall was destroyed by fire in 1947. It is built in sandstone and has a long rectangular plan. The building is in Neoclassical style, and has four storeys with a basement, and a front of eleven bays. Features include a pedimented doorway, allegorical relief statues, three windows with pierced balconies and crested cornices, and a frieze decorated with swags and urns.	II
Group of nine telephone kiosks 53.75972°N 2.69979°W		1935	The nine telephone kiosks are type K6 and designed by Giles Gilbert Scott. They stand to the west of the Post Office. Constructed in cast iron with a square plan and a dome, they have three unperforated crowns in the top panels.	II
Two telephone kiosks 53.75638°N 2.70754°W	—	1935	The telephone kiosks are type K6 and designed by Giles Gilbert Scott. They stand near the entrance to the railway station. Constructed in cast iron with a square plan and a dome, they have three unperforated crowns in the top panels.	II
Archbishop Temple School; 53.78319°N 2.70356°W	—	1964–66	The school is built in brown brick with copper sheeting and has felt-covered butterfly and monopitch roofs. The buildings, some of which are linked by walkways, include a block containing a gymnasium, assembly hall and classrooms, a three-storey administrative block, a single-storey maths block, a block containing classrooms and a dining hall, an oval shaped chapel, and a technical block with a three-star plan and a copper-clad flat-roofed tower. Alongside some of the blocks are landscaped pools.	II
Central bus station and car park 53.76100°N 2.69642°W		1969	The ground floor contains 80 bus stands, above which is a multi-storey car park, with four decks on the west side and five on the east. From each deck extends a curved concrete front. The north and south ends are tiled. Inside is a two-storey central spine containing passenger facilities, and four lifts.	II
Plastic classroom, Kennington Primary School; 53.77948°N 2.69547°W	—	1973–74	The classroom is built in glassfibre-reinforced plastic on a concrete base, and has the shaped of a modified icosahedron. There are seven windows in the lower part of the structure, and at the top the panels form a dome. It was the first fully structural plastic building in Britain.	II
