= Moor Park Methodist Church =

Coordinates: 53.7702°N 2.7049°W

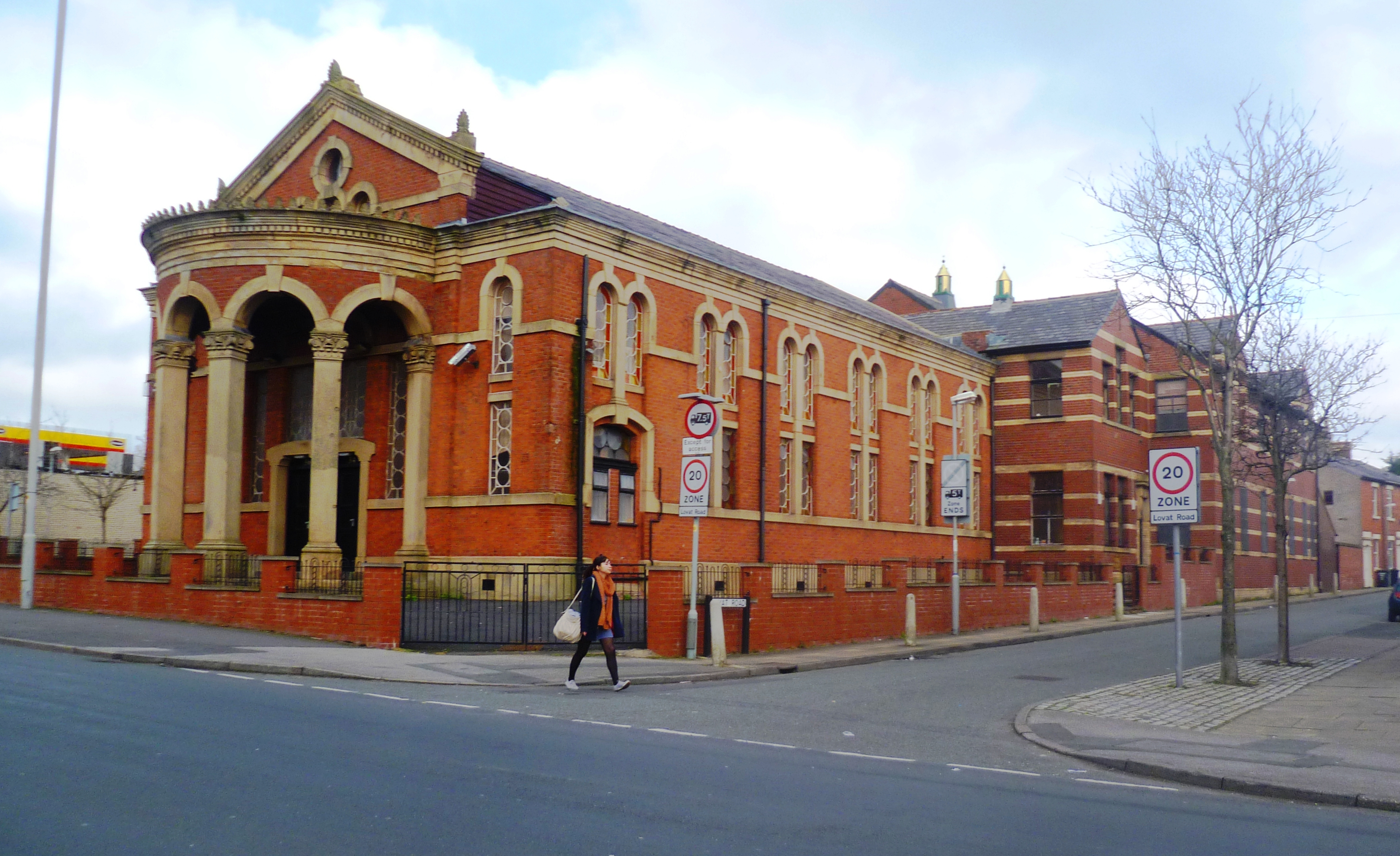
- Moor Park Methodist Church

- Location in Preston
- OS grid reference: SD 536 307
- Location: Garstang Road, Preston, Lancashire
- Country: England
- Denomination: Methodist

Architecture
- Functional status: Closed
- Heritage designation: Grade II
- Designated: 23 July 1984
- Architect(s): Poulton and Woodman
- Architectural type: Church
- Style: Italianate
- Groundbreaking: 1861
- Completed: 1862

Specifications
- Materials: Brick, sandstone dressings, slate roof

Moor Park Methodist Church is a former Methodist church in Garstang Road, Preston, Lancashire, England. It is recorded in the National Heritage List for England as a designated Grade II listed building.

== History ==
The church was built in 1861–62, and designed by Poulton and Woodman. It was opened on 26 June 1862, and could seat about 900 people. The church closed in 1984. (Note: The entry in the National Heritage List for England states that the former church was in use as a mosque, but the list of mosques in Central Preston does not include it. It was registered as a mosque with the name Jamia-tul-Muntazar on 8 July 1986.)

== Architecture ==
The church is built in brick on a stone plinth, with sandstone dressings and a slate roof, and is in simplified Italianate style. It has a rectangular plan, and contains aisles. On the entrance front is a semicircular portico carried on square columns with Composite capitals. Between these are round-headed arches with keystones. At the top of the portico is a frieze and a dentilled cornice. Inside the portico are double doorways and tall windows. The portico is flanked by bays, each containing a tall narrow round-headed arch with two windows, the lower one flat-headed and the upper one round-headed. Above the portico is a pediment with three windows forming an arcade, over which is an oculus. Along the sides of the church are six bays, each with paired arches separated by mullions, and each containing windows similar to those flanking the portico. Inside the church is a horseshoe gallery carried on octagonal cast iron columns.

== See also ==
- Listed buildings in Preston, Lancashire

== Notes and references ==
Notes

Citations
