= Black Horse, Preston =

Listed pub in Lancashire, England

Black Horse
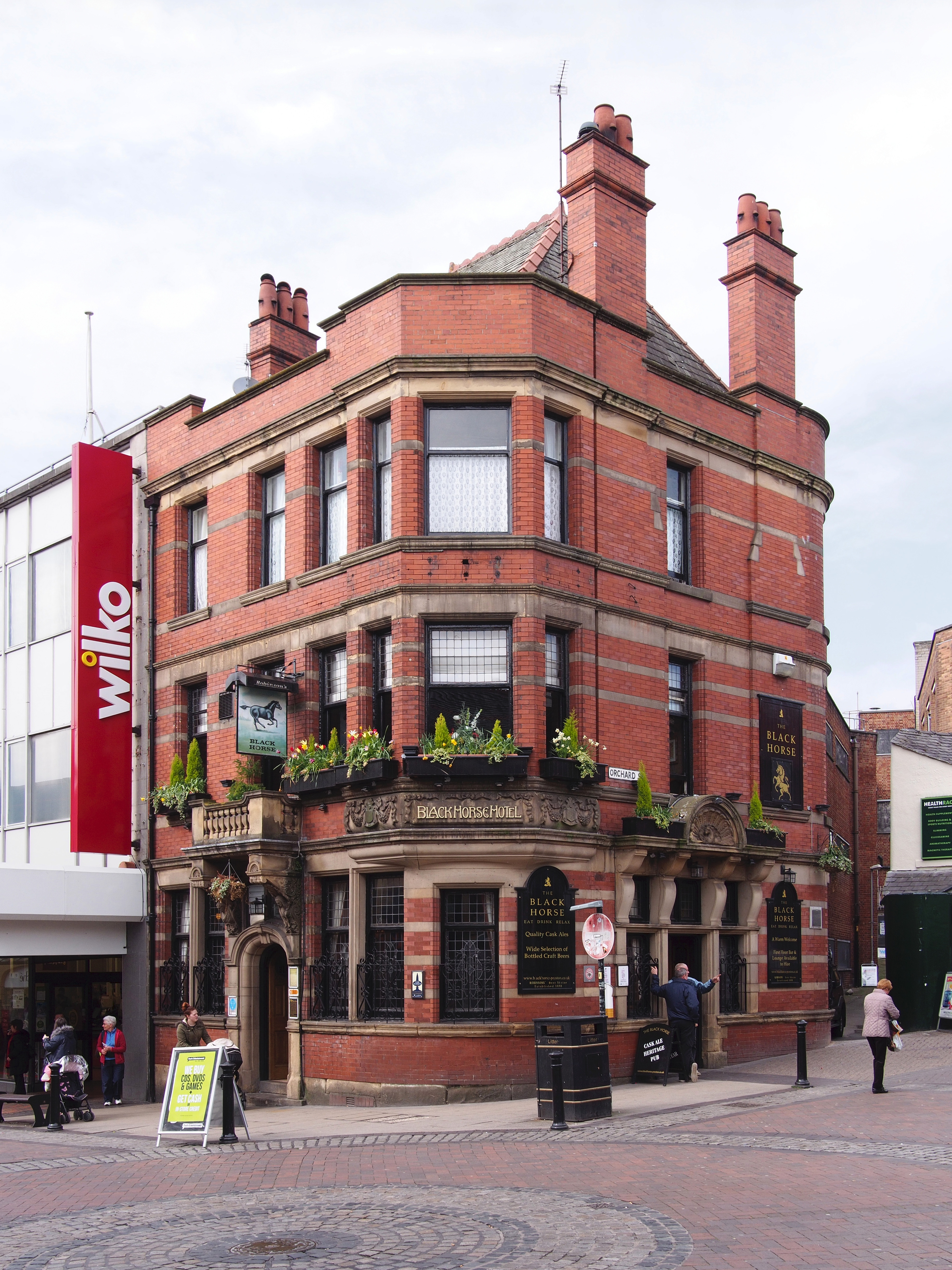
- The pub in 2015

- Location within Preston city centre
- Former names: Black Horse Hotel

General information
- Type: Public house; originally a hotel
- Location: 166 Friargate, Preston, Lancashire, England
- Coordinates: 53.7598°N 2.7011°W
- Year built: 1898; 128 years ago
- Client: Atlas Brewery Company
- Owner: Robinsons

Technical details
- Material: Red brick, sandstone

Design and construction
- Architect: J. A. Seward
- Designations

Listed Building – Grade II
- Official name: The Black Horse
- Designated: 31 December 1987
- Reference no.: 1217882

Website
- Official website

The Black Horse is a Grade II listed public house on Friargate in Preston, Lancashire, England. A pub has occupied the site since at least the late 18th century, while the present building was erected in 1898 as a hotel for the Atlas Brewery Company to designs by J. A. Seward. The pub is noted for its largely intact historic interior, which is included on the Campaign for Real Ale (CAMRA)'s National Inventory of Historic Pub Interiors and holds a three-star rating, denoting an interior of "outstanding national historic importance".

== History ==
The Black Horse name has been associated with a public house on this site on Friargate since at least the late 18th century. The present building was constructed in 1898 as a hotel for the Atlas Brewery Company of Manchester to designs by J. A. Seward of Preston, and later became a pub. The 1912 and 1946 Ordnance Survey maps mark the building as a public house with no attributed name.

When the building opened, a rear room known as the Market Room provided a meeting place for traders. In 1929, it was replaced by the present U-shaped seating area and indoor toilets, which are reached by separate corridors.

On 31 December 1987, the Black Horse was designated a Grade II listed building. Around 1995, the former public bar was linked to the central corridor by a new opening, and the present bar back and related fittings were introduced.

It was included on the Campaign for Real Ale (CAMRA)'s National Inventory of Historic Pub Interiors before the inventory's grading system was revised. Under the revised scheme, it is rated three stars and its interior is regarded as being "of outstanding national historic importance". It is one of only 14 pubs in the United Kingdom to still have a ceramic bar counter. As of July 2026, the freehold is owned by Robinsons Brewery.

== Architecture ==
=== Exterior ===
Built of red brick with stone detailing and slate roofs, the building occupies a prominent corner site. The main block is broadly rectangular in plan, with a rear section extending at a slight angle and three separate entrances serving different elevations.

The building rises to three storeys and faces both Friargate and Orchard Street, with a prominent angled corner between them. Decorative stone bands run across the façades at each floor level, while a projecting parapet crowns the building. The windows are traditional sashes, many retaining leaded upper lights and stained glass on the ground floor.

The principal entrance on Friargate is set within an ornate stone surround and is distinguished by a balcony supported by large carved figures. On either side are windows containing leaded and stained glass. The Orchard Street frontage has a second entrance topped by a carving of a horse's head, while a pair of chimney stacks rise above the roofline nearby.

At the angled corner is a projecting window above carved floral decoration, with the name "Black Horse Hotel" displayed beneath. To the rear, facing Lowthian Street, is a simpler range containing a third entrance and a series of upper-floor windows. Former cellar openings at ground level have been blocked.

=== Interior ===
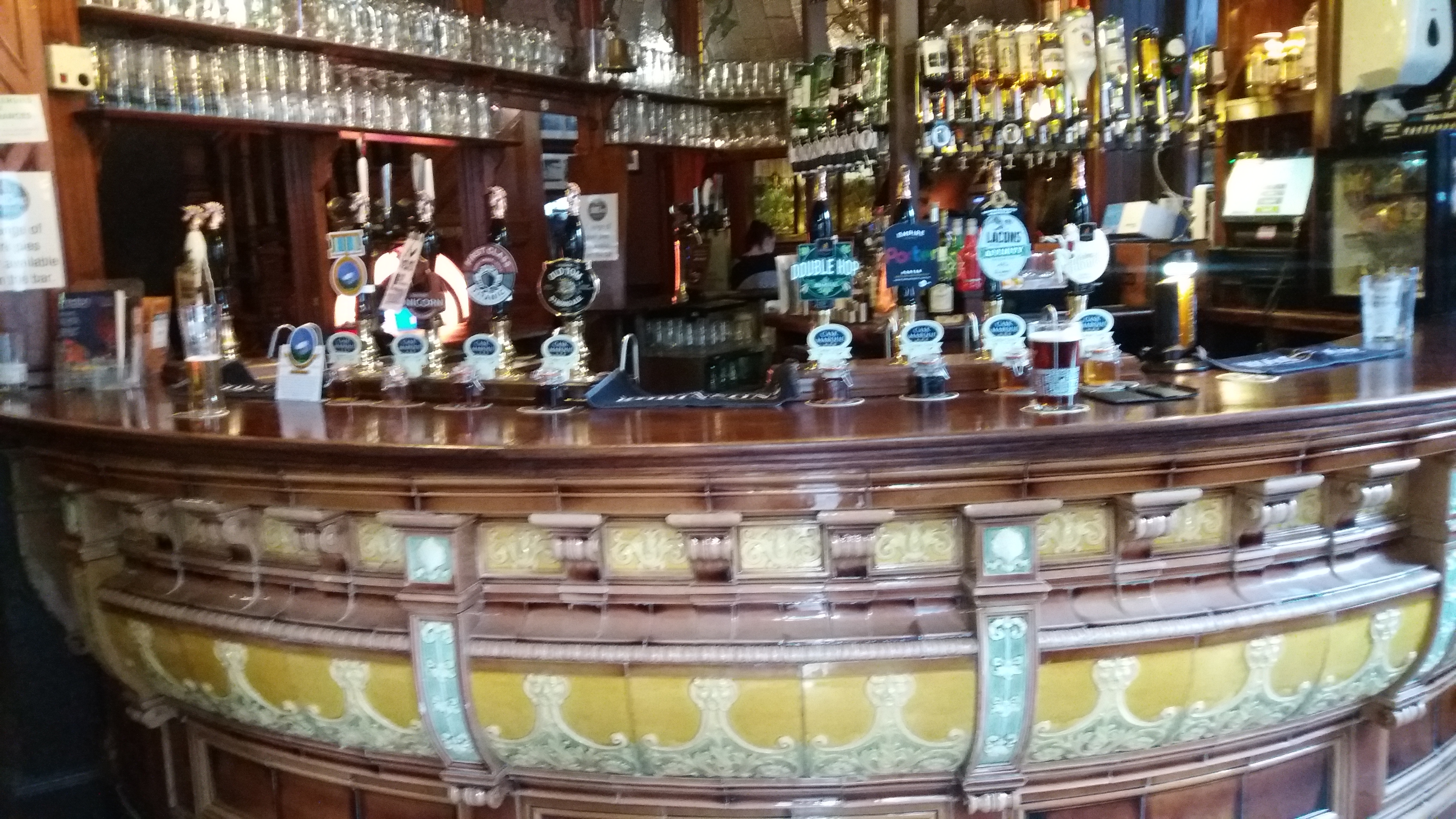
The Black Horse's bar in 2017

The interior retains much of its original layout and decorative detail. The main entrance on Friargate leads through a small vestibule with half-panelled walls and mosaic flooring into a central passage running to the rear of the building. On either side are two former smoke rooms, both retaining original doors and fittings, fixed seating, bell pushes and fireplaces.

The former public bar, originally entered from Orchard Street, centres on a semi-circular ceramic bar counter. It retains mosaic floors, decorative tiled wall finishes, stained and leaded glass, a ceramic fireplace and a geometric plaster ceiling. At the rear is a seating area with fixed benches, mirrored wall panels and further stained glass, while the entrance vestibule from Orchard Street also preserves its original decorative glass and fittings.

An ornamental timber staircase rises to the upper floors. The first floor includes a former function room retaining some historic features, while the second floor contains a corridor and several former hotel bedrooms with original doors and, in some cases, fireplaces. Below, the cellar includes an original vaulted section.

== See also ==
- Listed buildings in Preston, Lancashire
