= City Church, Preston =

Coordinates: 53.7632°N 2.6984°W

City Mosque, Preston
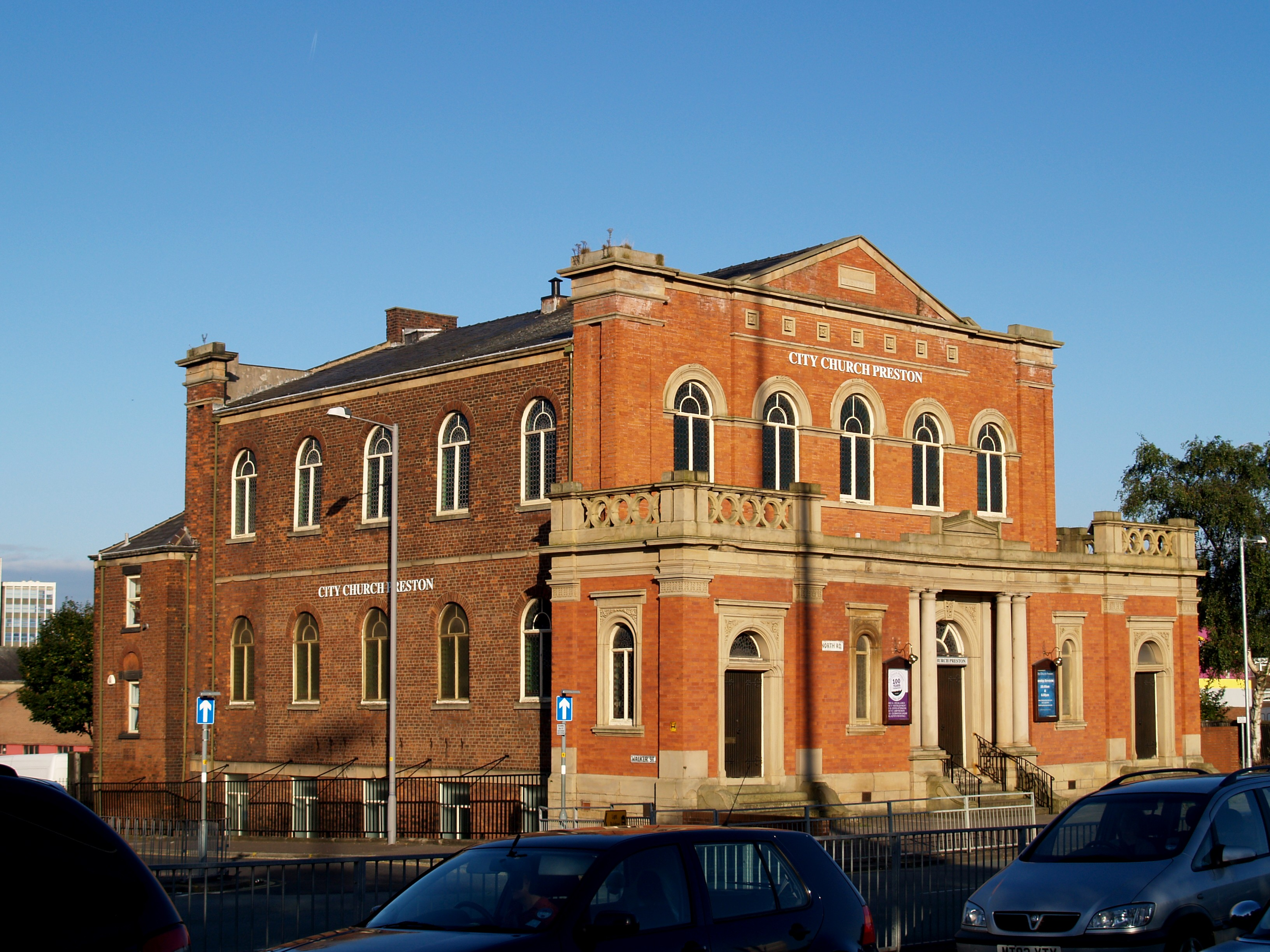

- Location in Preston
- OS grid reference: SD 541 299
- Location: North Road, Preston, Lancashire
- Country: England
- Previous denomination: Pentecostal

History
- Former name: North Road Pentecostal Church

Architecture
- Functional status: Active
- Heritage designation: Grade II
- Designated: 22 June 1989
- Architect: James Hibbert (alterations)
- Completed: 1838

Specifications
- Materials: Brick with stone dressings, slate roof

City Mosque Preston (formerly known as North Road Pentecostal Church) is in North Road, Preston, Lancashire, England, and is recorded in the National Heritage List for England as a designated Grade II listed building.

== History ==
The church was built in 1838 as a Wesleyan Methodist Church, and was partly rebuilt in 1885–86 by James Hibbert. It was later converted into a Pentecostal church. Since 2016 it is being used as a Mosque.

== Architecture ==
The church is built in brick (red on the front and brown on the sides) with sandstone dressings and a slate roof. It has a rectangular plan with its entrance on the east side, a small addition to the rear, and is in two storeys with a basement. At the entrance front is a projecting single-storey porch, wider than the body of the church, in five bays. It stands on a stone plinth, is symmetrical, and contains three round-headed doorways approached by steps, all with moulded architraves and fanlights. The central doorway has two pairs of Tuscan columns, and the outer doorways are flanked by pilasters. Between the doorways are round-headed windows with architraves, and there are similar but larger windows on the sides of the porch. Above the doorways is a continuous frieze and cornice. Above the outer windows and on the sides of the porch is a balustrade. The upper storey contains five windows with round moulded heads, and a band of square panels above them. At the top is a pediment containing a stone inscribed with the date of original building. Along the sides of the church are five bays with two tiers of round headed windows. Inside the church is a horseshoe-shaped gallery carried on slim cast iron columns with Ionic capitals. At the west end is a large arch with fluted pilasters.

== See also ==
- Listed buildings in Preston, Lancashire
