= St. Thomas' Church =

St. Thomas' Church, St. Thomas Chapel, Church of St Thomas, the Apostle or Mar Thoma, Christian church buildings or ecclesiastical parishes under the patronage of Saint Thomas the Apostle, Saint Thomas of Canterbury, Saint Thomas Aquinas, or Saint Thomas More.

== Church buildings under the patronage of Saint Thomas the Apostle ==
=== Australia ===
- St Thomas' Anglican Church, Mulgoa
- St Thomas' Anglican Church, Narellan
- St Thomas' Anglican Church, North Sydney

=== Canada ===
- St. Thomas' Anglican Church (Moose Factory, Ontario)
- St. Thomas Anglican Church (Shanty Bay, Ontario)
- St. Thomas's Anglican Church (Toronto), Ontario

=== Czech Republic ===
- Church of St. Thomas (Brno)

=== Denmark ===
- St Thomas' Church, Copenhagen

=== France ===
- St Thomas' Church, Strasbourg
- St Thomas' Church, Landerneau

=== Germany ===
- St. Thomas Church, Berlin
- St. Thomas Church, Leipzig, workplace of J.S. Bach

=== India ===
- St. Thomas Church, Palayoor
- St. Thomas Cathedral, Mumbai
- St. Thomas Church, Kolkata
- St. Thomas Cathedral Basilica, Chennai, or National Shrine of St. Thomas
- St. Thomas Evangelical Church of India, Kerala
- St. Thomas Mar Thoma Church, Pallipad
- St. Thomas Church, Hisar
- Mar Thoma Syrian Church, Kerala

=== Iran ===
- St. Thomas Church, Balowlan

=== Italy ===
- Church of St. Thomas, Alcamo, Trapani, Sicily
- San Tommaso Apostolo (disambiguation)

=== Israel ===
- St. Thomas Church, Jerusalem

=== Ireland ===
- St Thomas the Apostle parish, Laurel Lodge, Blanchardstown, Dublin

=== Norway ===
- St. Thomas Church, Filefjell

=== Pakistan ===
- Saint Thomas' Church, Dera Ismail Khan

=== Philippines ===
- Saint Thomas the Apostle Parish, Santo Tomas, Pampanga

=== Slovenia ===
- St. Thomas's Church (Rateče), Kranjska Gora

=== United Kingdom ===
- St Thomas' Church, Ashton-in-Makerfield, Greater Manchester
- St Thomas's Church, Aslockton, Nottinghamshire
- St Thomas' Church, Belfast, Northern Ireland
- St Thomas' Church, Blackburn (demolished), Lancashire
- St Thomas' Church, Blackpool, Lancashire
- St Thomas' Church, Coventry, West Midlands
- Church of St Thomas, Cricket St Thomas, Somerset
- St Thomas' Church, Crookes, Sheffield
- St Thomas' Church, East Shefford, Berkshire
- St Thomas's Church, East Orchard, Dorset
- St Thomas' Church, Eaton, Cheshire
- St Thomas, Exeter, Devon
- St Thomas' Church, Friarmere, Delph, Greater Manchester
- St Thomas' Church, Garstang, Lancashire
- St Thomas' Church, Halliwell, Bolton, Greater Manchester
- St Thomas the Apostle, Hanwell, Ealing, London
- St Thomas' Church, Henbury, Cheshire
- St Thomas's Church, Huddersfield, West Yorkshire
- St Thomas Church, Jersey, St Helier
- St Thomas's Church, Keith, Moray
- St Thomas' Church, Kendal, Cumbria
- St Thomas' Church, Lancaster, Lancashire
- Church of St Thomas, Lees, Greater Manchester
- St Thomas the Apostle, London
- St Thomas' Church, Lydiate, Sefton, Merseyside
- St Thomas' Church, Mellor, Greater Manchester
- St Thomas' Church, Milnthorpe, Cumbria
- Sts Thomas Minster, Newport, Isle of Wight
- St Thomas's Church, Oakwood, London
- St Thomas' Church, Parkgate, Cheshire
- St Thomas' Church, Pendleton, Salford
- St Thomas' Church, Plaistow, Plaistow, Newham
- St Thomas' Church, Preston, Lancashire
- Church of St Thomas, Redwick, Newport, Wales
- St Thomas' Church, St Anne's-on-the-Sea, Lancashire
- St Thomas' Church, Stockport, Greater Manchester
- St Thomas' Church, Stockton Heath, Warrington, Cheshire
- St Thomas Church, Swansea, Wales
- Church of St Thomas, Thurlbear, Somerset
- Church of St Thomas, Thurstonland, West Yorkshire
- Church of St Thomas, Wells, Somerset
- St Thomas's Church, West Ham, London
- St Thomas Church, Winchester, Hampshire
- St Thomas the Apostle Rural, a civil parish in Cornwall

=== United States ===
- St. Thomas Anglican Church (Mountain Home, Arkansas)
- St. Thomas the Apostle Hollywood, California
- St. Thomas the Apostle Catholic Church (Los Angeles)
- St. Thomas Episcopal Church (Alamosa, Colorado)
- St. Thomas Episcopal Church (Newark, Delaware)
- St. Thomas African Methodist Episcopal Church, Hawkinsville, Georgia
- St. Thomas Catholic Church (Coeur d'Alene, Idaho)
- St. Thomas Church and Convent, Chicago, Illinois
- St. Thomas Episcopal Church (Sioux City, Iowa)
- Church of St Thomas, the Apostle and Howard-Flaget House, Bardstown, Kentucky
- St. Thomas Episcopal Church (Beattyville, Kentucky)
- St. Thomas Church (Owings Mills, Maryland)
- St. Thomas' Church (Upper Marlboro, Maryland)
- St. Thomas Episcopal Church (Taunton, Massachusetts)
- St. Thomas the Apostle Catholic Church (Ann Arbor, Michigan)
- St. Thomas the Apostle Catholic Church (Detroit)
- St. Thomas Episcopal Church (Dover, New Hampshire)
- St. Thomas Episcopal Church (Glassboro, New Jersey)
- St. Thomas Episcopal Church (Amenia Union, New York)
- Saint Thomas' Chapel (East Hampton, New York)
- St. Thomas' Episcopal Church Complex (Mamaroneck, New York)
- Saint Thomas Church (Manhattan), New York
- St. Thomas Episcopal Church (New Windsor, New York)
- St. Thomas Episcopal Church (Pittstown, New Jersey)
- St. Thomas Episcopal Church (Slaterville Springs, New York)
- St. Thomas Episcopal Church (Bath, North Carolina)
- St. Thomas Episcopal Church (Port Clinton, Ohio)
- St. Thomas Episcopal Church (Terrace Park, Ohio)
- St. Thomas Primitive Baptist Church, Summit, Oklahoma
- St. Thomas' Episcopal Church (Canyon City, Oregon)
- St. Thomas the Apostle Church (Glen Mills), Glen Mills, Pennsylvania
- African Episcopal Church of St. Thomas, Philadelphia, Pennsylvania
- St. Thomas' Church, Whitemarsh, Pennsylvania
- St. Thomas Church (Brownsville, Texas)
- St. Thomas Church (Underhill, Vermont)
- St. Thomas Chapel (Middletown, Virginia), or St. Thomas Church
- St. Thomas Church (Orange, Virginia)
- Church of St. Thomas the Apostle, Beloit, Wisconsin

== Church buildings under the patronage of Saint Thomas of Canterbury ==
Church buildings under the patronage of Saint Thomas of Canterbury, also known as Thomas Becket, Thomas à Becket and St Thomas the Martyr.

=== In the United Kingdom ===
- Cathedral Church of St Thomas of Canterbury, commonly known as Portsmouth Cathedral
- Church of St Thomas à Becket, Box
- St Thomas the Martyr, Bristol
- Church of St Thomas à Becket, Capel
- St Thomas of Canterbury Church, Chester
- St Thomas Church, Dudley
- Church of St Thomas the Martyr, Newcastle upon Tyne
- Sts Thomas Minster, Newport, Isle of Wight, which may ambiguously have St Thomas à Becket or St Thomas the Apostle as its patron
- St Thomas the Martyr's Church, Oxford
- St Thomas à Becket Church, Pensford
- St Thomas' Church, Southwark
- Church of St Thomas the Martyr, Upholland
- St Thomas à Becket Church, Warblington
- St Thomas à Becket Church, Widcombe
- Church of St Thomas à Becket, Wolvesnewton
- Church of St Thomas, Dudley, West Midlands

== Church buildings under the patronage of Saint Thomas Aquinas ==
=== Australia ===
- St Thomas Aquinas Church, Springwood

=== Canada ===
- St. Thomas Aquinas Church, Toronto

=== France ===
- Saint Thomas Aquinas Church, Paris

=== Philippines ===
- Saint Thomas Aquinas Parish Church, Santo Tomas, Batangas
- Saint Thomas Aquinas Parish Church, Mangaldan, Pangasinan
- Saint Thomas Aquinas Parish Church, Santo Tomas, Pangasinan

=== Spain ===
- Saint Thomas Aquinas Church, Zaragoza

=== United Kingdom ===
- St Thomas Aquinas Church, Ham, London

=== United States ===
- St. Thomas Aquinas Chapel (Ojai, California)
- St. Thomas Aquinas Church (Palo Alto, California)
- St. Thomas Aquinas Church (Fairfield, Connecticut)
- St. Thomas Aquinas Church (Zanesville, Ohio)
- Saint Thomas Aquinas Cathedral, Reno, Nevada

== Church buildings under the patronage of Saint Thomas More ==
- St. Thomas More Church (New York City)
- St Thomas' Church, Exeter, a parish church in the Church of England

== See also ==
- Cathedral of Saint Thomas (disambiguation)
- St. Thomas Synagogue, Charlotte, Virgin Islands
- St. Thomas Mount, Chennai
- St Thomas à Becket Church (disambiguation), named after Saint Thomas Becket
- St. Thomas Aquinas Church (disambiguation), named after Saint Thomas Aquinas
