= St. Thomas Anglican Church =

St. Thomas Anglican Church may refer to:

== Australia ==
- St Thomas' Anglican Church, Mulgoa, New South Wales
- St Thomas' Anglican Church, Narellan, New South Wales
- St Thomas' Anglican Church, North Sydney, New South Wales
- St Thomas' Anglican Church, Port Macquarie, New South Wales
- St Thomas' Anglican Church, Toowong, Queensland
- St Thomas' Anglican Church, Winchelsea, Victoria

== Canada ==
- St. Thomas' Anglican Church (Moose Factory, Ontario)
- St. Thomas Anglican Church (Shanty Bay, Ontario)
- St. Thomas's Anglican Church (Toronto), Ontario
- St. Thomas Anglican Church (Silver Creek, Quebec)

== United States ==
- St. Thomas Anglican Church (Mountain Home, Arkansas)

== See also ==
- St. Thomas' Church (disambiguation)
- St Thomas Aquinas Church (disambiguation)
