= St. Thomas the Apostle Church =

St. Thomas the Apostle Church may refer to:

== Australia ==
- Chaldean Catholic Eparchy of Saint Thomas the Apostle, Sydney, Australia

== England ==
- St Thomas the Apostle, Hanwell
- Church of St Thomas the Apostle, Harty
- Church of St Thomas the Apostle, Killinghall
- Church of St Thomas the Apostle, Lymington
- St Thomas the Apostle Rural, a rural parish church in Cornwall
- St Thomas the Apostle, London, a former church

== United States ==
California

- St. Thomas the Apostle Catholic Church (Los Angeles), Roman Catholic church built in 1924
- St. Thomas the Apostle Hollywood, California, Episcopal/Anglican church

Connecticut

- Saint Thomas the Apostle Church (Connecticut)

Kentucky

- Church of St Thomas, the Apostle and Howard-Flaget House

Michigan

- St. Thomas the Apostle Catholic Church (Detroit)

Missouri

- St. Thomas the Apostle Church (Saint Thomas, Missouri)

New Jersey

- St. Thomas the Apostle Church (Old Bridge)

New York

- St. Thomas the Apostle Church (Manhattan)

Pennsylvania

- St. Thomas the Apostle Church (Glen Mills)

Wisconsin

- Church of St. Thomas the Apostle (Beloit, Wisconsin), NRHP-listed

== See also ==
- St. Thomas' Church (disambiguation)
