= St. Thomas Aquinas Church =

A list of Christian church buildings or ecclesiastical parishes named in honour of Saint Thomas Aquinas or having him as their patron. To be distinguished from similarly named lists of churches whose patron is

- Saint Thomas the Apostle – see St. Thomas' Church
- Saint Thomas Becket – see St Thomas à Becket Church.

They are listed by country below.

== Australia ==
- St Thomas Aquinas' Church, Clunes, Victoria
- St Thomas Aquinas Church, Springwood, New South Wales

== Canada ==
- St. Thomas Aquinas Church, Toronto

== France ==
- Saint Thomas Aquinas Church, Paris

== Philippines ==
- Saint Thomas Aquinas Parish Church, Santo Tomas, Batangas
- Saint Thomas Aquinas Parish Church, Mangaldan, Pangasinan
- Saint Thomas Aquinas Parish Church, Santo Tomas, Pangasinan

== Spain ==
- Saint Thomas Aquinas Church, Zaragoza

== United Kingdom ==
- St Thomas Aquinas Church, Ham, London
- St Thomas Aquinas & St Stephen Harding Church, Market Drayton, Shropshire

== United States ==
- St. Thomas Aquinas Chapel (Ojai, California)
- St. Thomas Aquinas Church (Palo Alto, California)
- St. Thomas Aquinas Church (Fairfield, Connecticut)
- St. Thomas Aquinas Church (Zanesville, Ohio)
- Saint Thomas Aquinas Cathedral, Reno, Nevada
- St. Thomas Aquinas Church, St. Cloud, Florida

== Belarus ==
- Church of St. Thomas Aquinas and the Dominican monastery in Minsk

== See also ==
- List of institutions named after Thomas Aquinas
