= Saint Maurice Church (Connecticut) =

Coordinates: 41°03′58.73″N 73°31′20.01″W

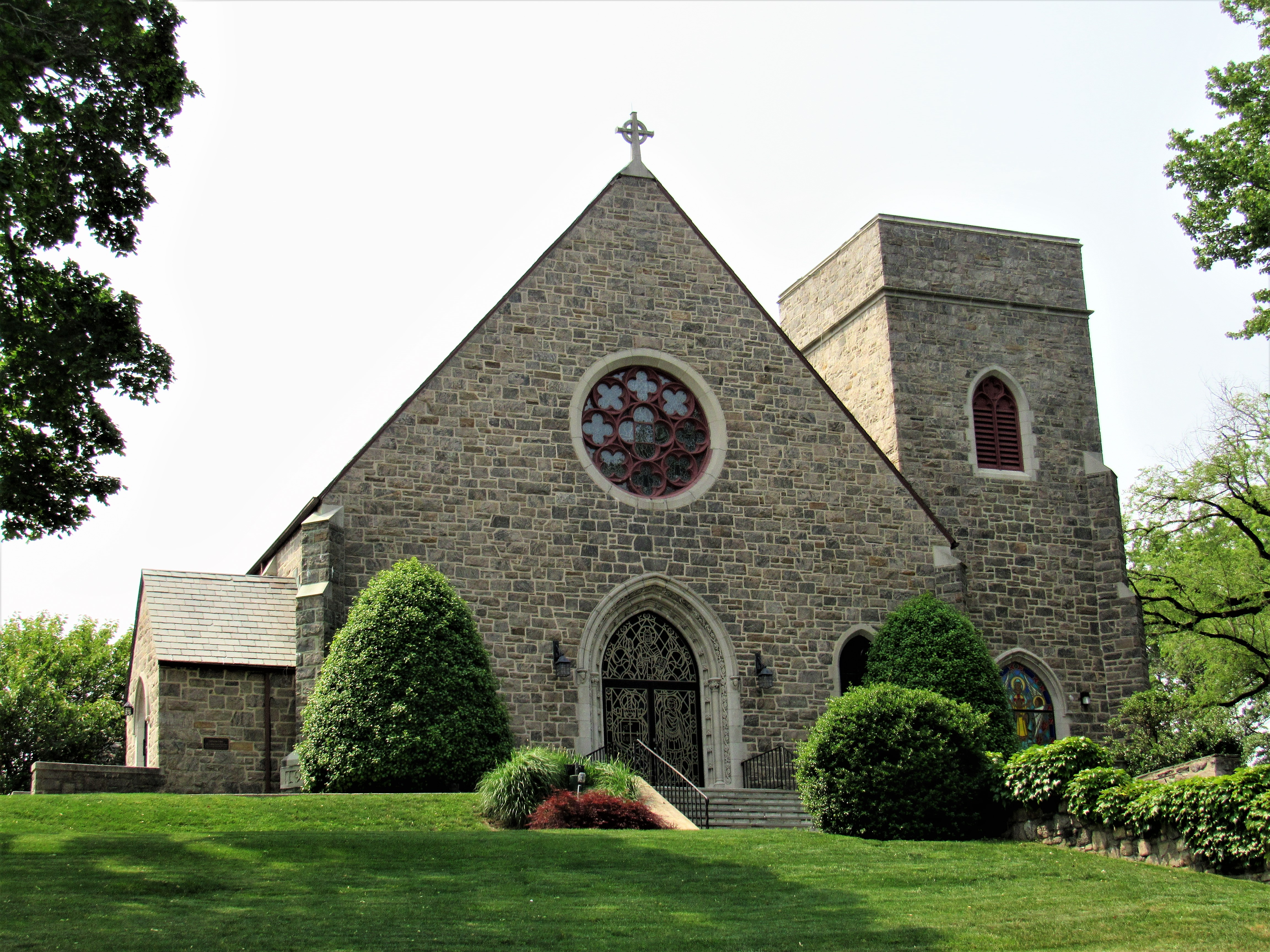
- Saint Maurice Church
- Location: 358 Glenbrook Road; Stamford, Connecticut
- Country: United States
- Denomination: Roman Catholic

Architecture
- Architect: Polak and Sullivan

Administration
- Province: Hartford
- Diocese: Bridgeport

Clergy
- Bishop: Most Rev. Frank Joseph Caggiano
- Pastor: Rev. Alfred A. Riendeau Jr.

St Maurice is a Roman Catholic church in Stamford, Connecticut, part of the Diocese of Bridgeport.

== History ==
Referred to as the Little Church on the Hill, St. Maurice Church is named after Bishop Maurice F. McAuliffe who served as the 8th Bishop of Hartford (1934-1944). The Norman-Gothic Revival church was built in 1936 to the designs of the architectural firm of Polak and Sullivan from New Haven, CT.
