= Allodi =

Allodi is a surname. Notable people with the surname include:

- Edward F. Allodi (1893–1987), Italian-born American architect
- Italo Allodi (1928–1999), Italian football player and manager
- James Allodi (born 1967), Canadian actor, writer, and director
