= San Tommaso Apostolo (disambiguation) =

San Tommaso Apostolo is a titular church in Rome.

San Tommaso Apostolo may also refer to the following churches in Italy:

- San Tommaso Apostolo, Albignasego, Padua, Veneto
- San Tommaso Apostolo, Alcamo, Trapani, Sicily
- San Tommaso Apostolo, Enna, Sicily

== See also ==
- Basilica of San Tommaso Apostolo, Ortona, Abruzzo, Italy
- St. Thomas the Apostle (disambiguation)
