= Santo Tomas, Pampanga =

Municipality in Pampanga, Philippines

Santo Tomas
- Municipality
- Municipality of Sto. Tomas
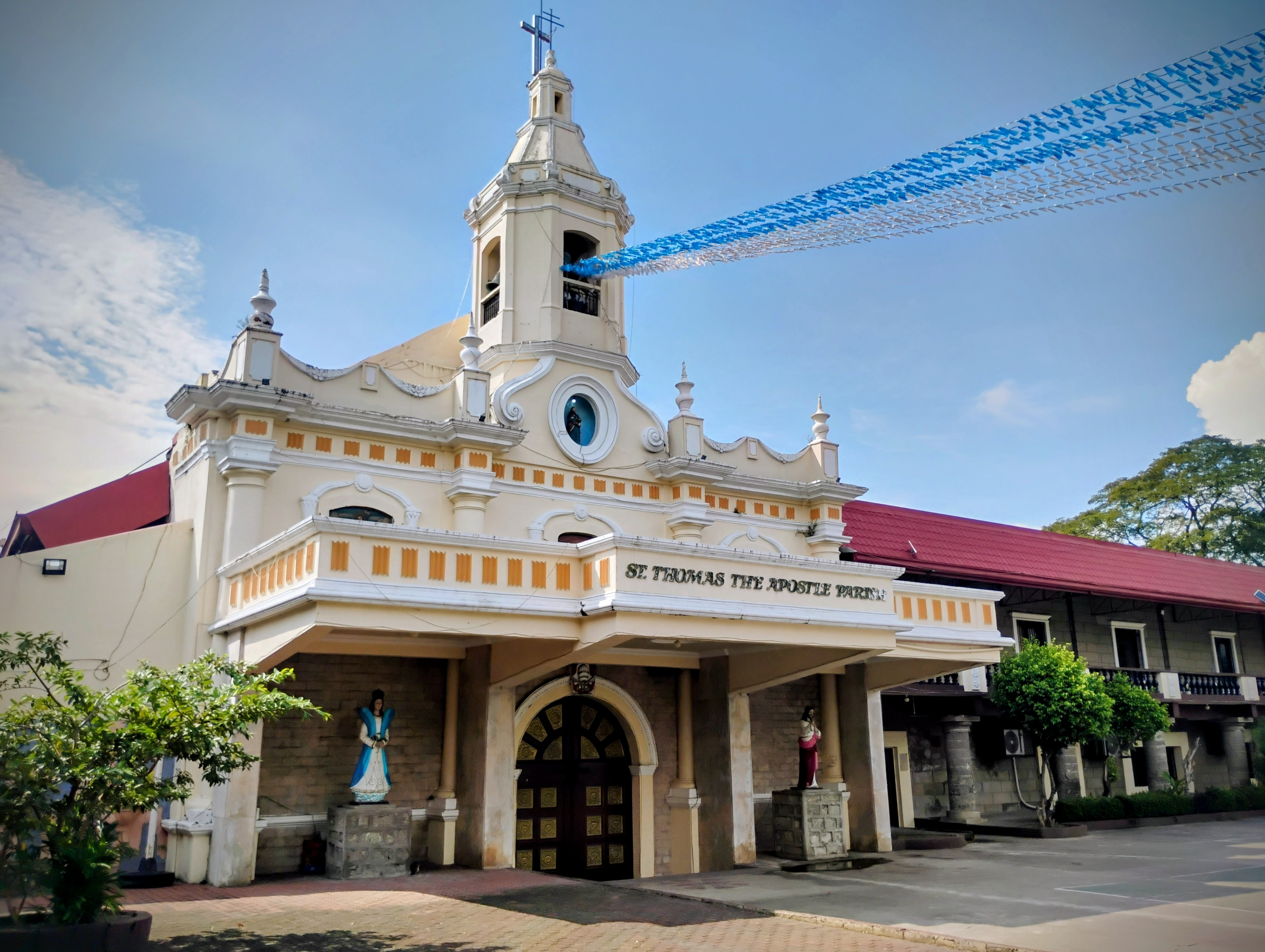
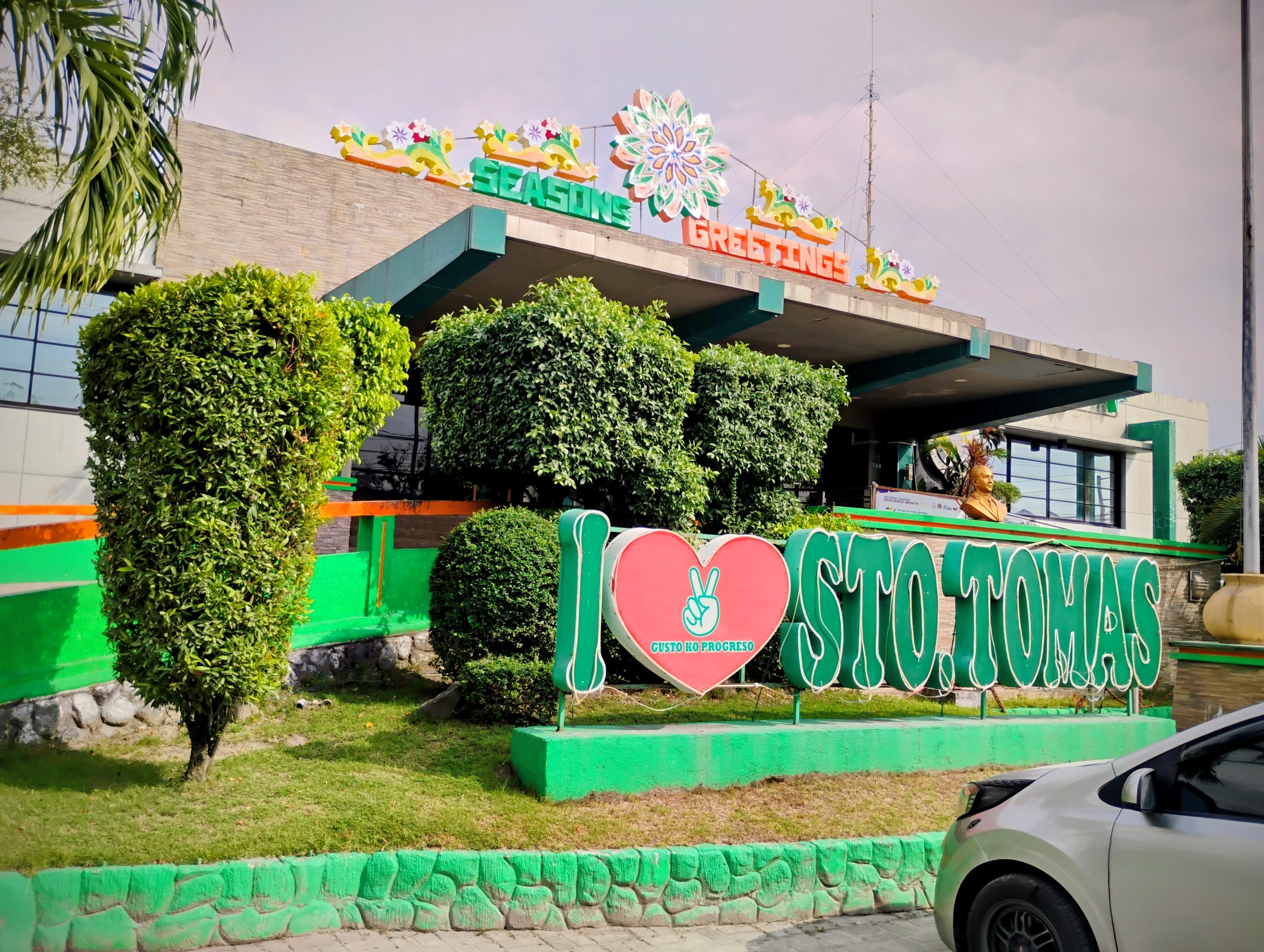
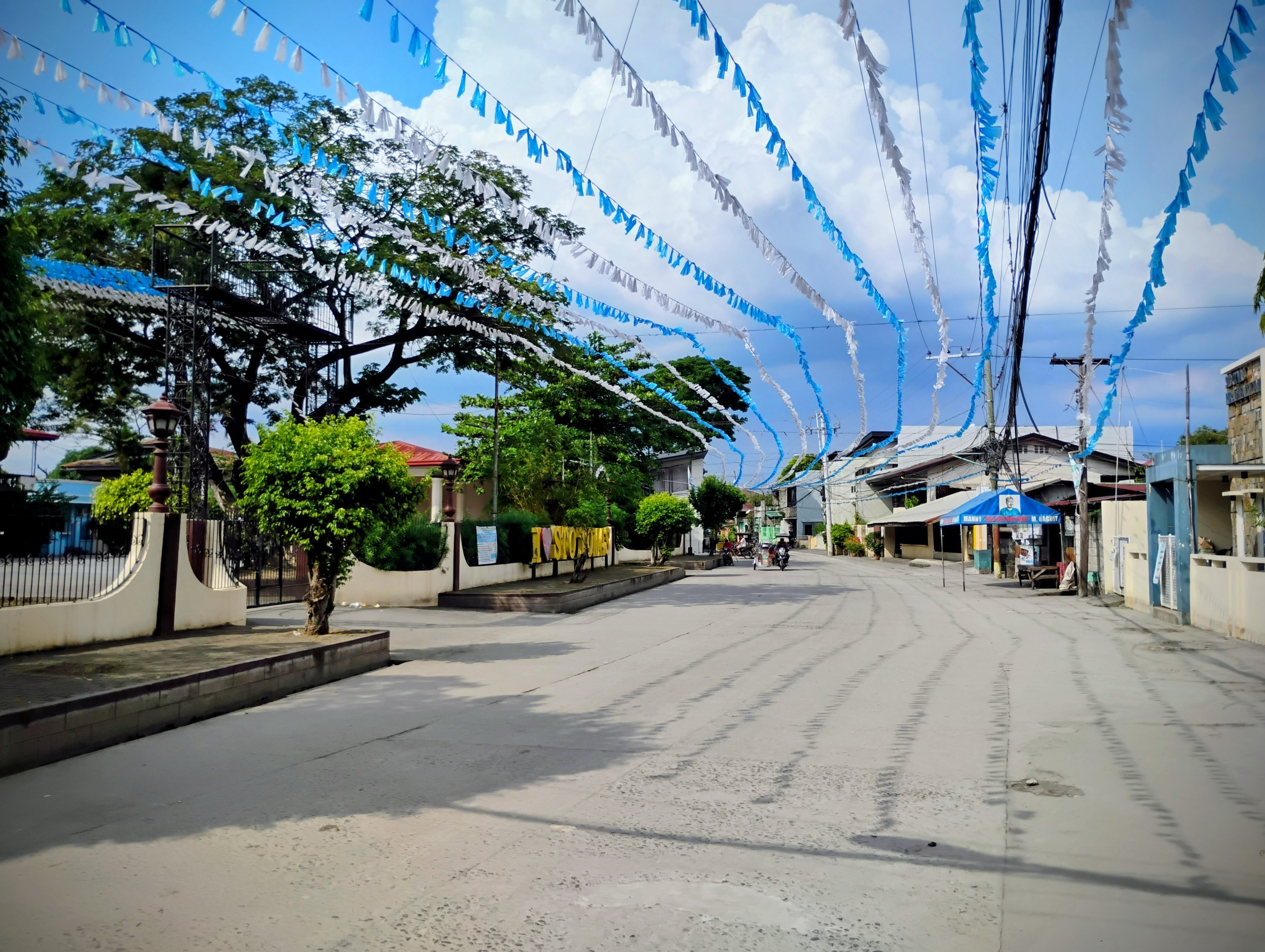
- Saint Thomas the Apostle Parish Church Santo Tomas Municipal Hall Santo Tomas Town Proper

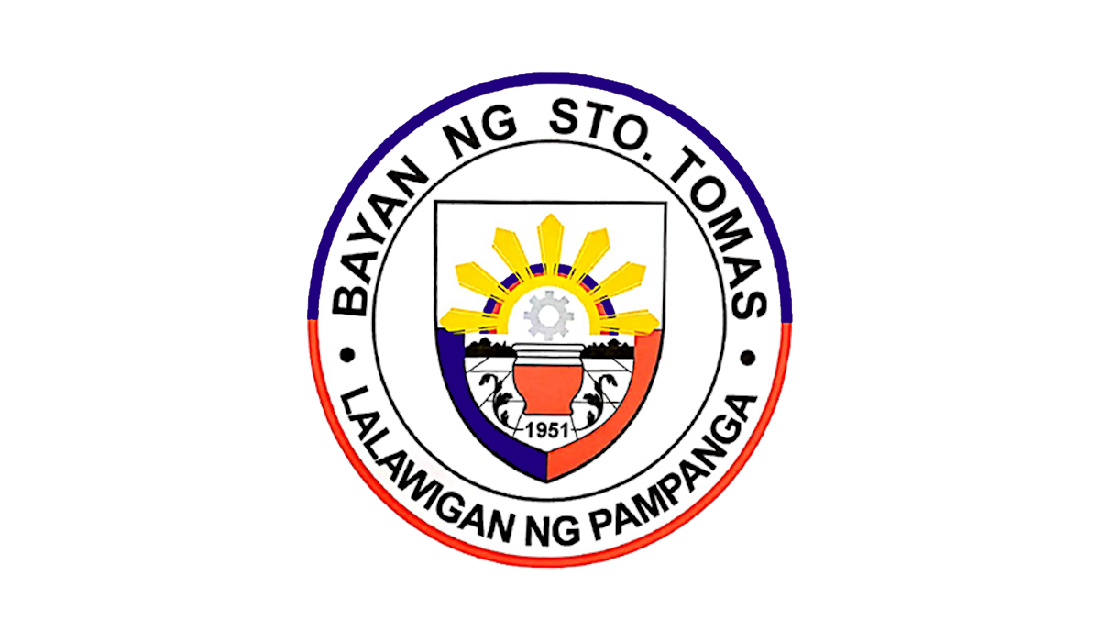
- Flag Seal
- Nickname: Casket capital of the Philippines
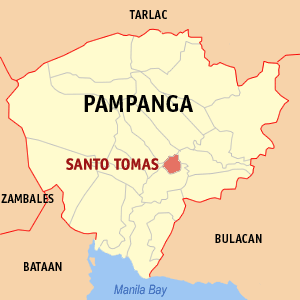
- Map of Pampanga with Santo Tomas highlighted
- Interactive map of Santo Tomas
- Location within the Philippines
- Coordinates: 15°00′N 120°45′E
- Country: Philippines
- Region: Central Luzon
- Province: Pampanga
- District: 4th district
- Founded: 1767
- Chartered: October 12, 1951
- Named for: St. Thomas the Apostle
- Barangays: 7 (see Barangays)

Government
  - Type: Sangguniang Bayan
  - Mayor: John A. Sambo
  - Vice Mayor: Ninang Ronquillo
  - Representative: Anna York P. Bondoc-Sagum
  - Councilors: List: Anjeli A. Tantamco; Mark Louie T. Arceo; Nicolas S. David; Meriam B. Garcia; Engelbert T. Euperio; Teresita D. Juarez; Marvin N. Pineda; Yayadin A. Quiambao
  - Electorate: 34,555 voters (2025)

Area
  - Total: 21.30 km^{2} (8.22 sq mi)
- Elevation: 7.0 m (23.0 ft)
- Highest elevation: 42 m (138 ft)
- Lowest elevation: −3 m (−9.8 ft)

Population (2024 census)
  - Total: 44,376
  - Density: 2,083/km^{2} (5,396/sq mi)
  - Households: 11,218

Economy
  - Income class: 2nd municipal income class
  - Poverty incidence: 5.02% (2023)
  - Revenue: ₱ 181.2 million (2024)
  - Assets: ₱ 152.7 million (2024)
  - Expenditure: ₱ 172.2 million (2024)
  - Liabilities: ₱ 23.86 million (2024)

Service provider
  - Electricity: Pampanga 3 Electric Cooperative (PELCO 3)
- Time zone: UTC+8 (PST)
- ZIP code: 2020
- PSGC: 0305421000
- IDD : area code: +63 (0)45
- Native languages: Kapampangan; Tagalog
- Website: www.stotomaspampanga.com

Santo Tomas, officially the Municipality of Sto. Tomas (Kapampangan: Balen ning Santo Tomas; Tagalog: Bayan ng Santo Tomas), is a municipality in the province of Pampanga, Philippines. According to the 2024 census, it has a population of 44,376 people.

It is a mainly agricultural and fishing community. Local industries include casket manufacturing, ceramics, and carpentry.

== Etymology ==
The town's original name was "Baliwag" which is an old Capampangan word which means "untouched". The name Baliwag was chosen because the area was previously considered remote, isolated and in a pristine state before colonization and development however other belief that Baliwag was a slang word for tardiness due to the locals habit of arriving late for the Holy Mass considering that their houses were built around the vicinity of the church. Old catholic records such as Baptismal Certificates bears the name Pueblo de Baliwag later changed to El Pueblo de Santo Tomas during the Spanish period. Santo Tomas Apostol or Saint Thomas the Apostle, one of the original twelve disciples of Jesus Christ, had its patron saint. The patronal feast is celebrated yearly on 21 December from the church's original founding date of 1767. During the Second Vatican Council of 1969, the feast of Saint Thomas the Apostle was changed to July 3 and the town's started celebrating the new feast during the mid of 1990s.

== History ==
On September 15, 1792, Santo Tomas was severed from its parent town, Minalin. On May 4, 1899, the town was under the U.S. Force's administration. On January 2, 1905, it was ceded to San Fernando until 1905. On October 12, 1951, Executive Order No. 476 (issued by Elpidio Quirino) created Santo Tomas and its five barrios of San Matias, San Vicente, San Bartolome, Santo Rosario and Santo Tomas with the seat of government at barrio San Vicente.

On January 11, 1952, the municipality of Santo Tomas was re-inaugurated. The first municipal hall was temporarily at the house of Mayor Patricio Gomez, the first municipal mayor.

In 1955, under Republic Act 1250, the San Matias seat was transferred to Santo Tomas. President Ferdinand E. Marcos issued Presidential Decree No. 1441 on June 11, 1978, transferring the seat of municipal government from Barangay Santo Tomas to Barangay San Vicente.

The town was the site of the bloody encounter between Filipino and American forces during Philippine-American War known as the Battle of Santo Tomas.

== Geography ==
The municipality of Santo Tomas, the smallest and youngest town in Pampanga, is at the heart of the province. The capital city of San Fernando bounds it to the northwest, the municipality of San Simon to the northeast, the municipality of Minalin to the southeast, and Bacolor to the west.

=== Barangays ===
Santo Tomas is politically divided into seven barangays, as shown below. Each barangay consists of puroks and some have sitios.

- Moras De La Paz
- Poblacion
- San Bartolome
- San Matias
- San Vicente
- Santo Rosario (Pau)
- Sapa (Santo Niño)

=== Climate ===
Climate data for Santo Tomas, Pampanga
Month	Jan	Feb	Mar	Apr	May	Jun	Jul	Aug	Sep	Oct	Nov	Dec	Year
Mean daily maximum °C (°F)	28 (82)	29 (84)	31 (88)	33 (91)	32 (90)	31 (88)	30 (86)	29 (84)	29 (84)	30 (86)	30 (86)	28 (82)	30 (86)
Mean daily minimum °C (°F)	20 (68)	20 (68)	21 (70)	23 (73)	24 (75)	24 (75)	24 (75)	24 (75)	24 (75)	23 (73)	22 (72)	21 (70)	23 (72)
Average precipitation mm (inches)	6 (0.2)	4 (0.2)	6 (0.2)	17 (0.7)	82 (3.2)	122 (4.8)	151 (5.9)	123 (4.8)	124 (4.9)	99 (3.9)	37 (1.5)	21 (0.8)	792 (31.1)
Average rainy days	3.3	2.5	3.6	6.6	17.7	22.2	25.2	23.7	23.2	17.9	9.2	5.2	160.3
Source: Meteoblue

== Demographics ==
Population census of Santo Tomas

Year	Pop.	±% p.a.
1903	4,271	—
1960	12,097	+1.84%
1970	18,907	+4.56%
1975	21,320	+2.44%
1980	24,951	+3.19%
1990	33,309	+2.93%
1995	29,628	−2.17%

Year	Pop.	±% p.a.
2000	32,695	+2.13%
2007	37,866	+2.05%
2010	38,062	+0.19%
2015	40,475	+1.18%
2020	42,846	+1.21%
2024	44,376	+0.85%

Source: Philippine Statistics Authority

In the 2024 census, the population of Santo Tomas was 44,376 people, with a density of 2,100 inhabitants per square kilometre or 5,400 inhabitants per square mile.

== Economy ==
Poverty incidence of Santo Tomas (%)

Source: Philippine Statistics Authority

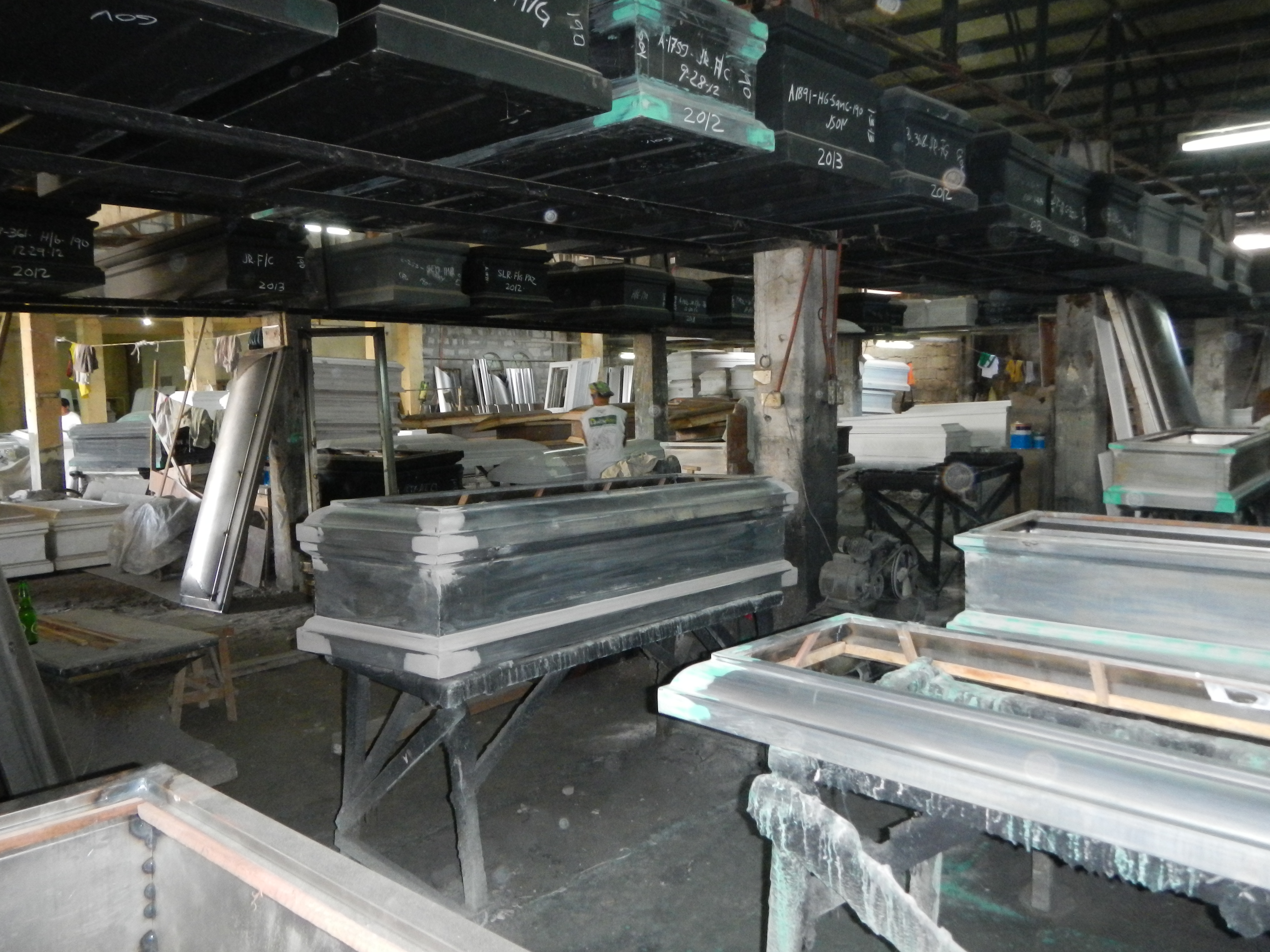
Casket manufacturing

In the records of Department of Trade and Industry (Philippines), the town holds the title “casket capital of Central Luzon.” It is home to 300 family-owned casket businesses that each produce about 80 caskets monthly or a total production of 24,000 a month. Casket capital of the Philippines, Oct. 22, 2012

=== Tourism ===
Santo Tomas' main attractions and events are:

- The yearly Easter Sunday Flower Scattering Festival or Sabuaga Festival (from sabuag and sampaga which means scatter flowers) originated from Easter Sunday “Salubong” (April 8, 2012) where estabats scatter flowers.
- First Evacuation Center and Multi-Purpose Hall at Barangay Santo Tomas, July 5, 2010.
- The Northville 12 ECCD Center and Health Center, July 15, 2010.
- Municipal Hall Annex, Donato B. Pangilinan Sr. building, also the New Public Market and Police Station, inaugurated on the 60th anniversary of Santo Tomas founding, October 12, 2011.

== Government ==
Pursuant to the local government the political seat of the municipality is at the Municipal Town Hall. The gobernadorcillo is the chief executive who holds office in the Presidencia. During the American rule (1898–1946), the elected mayor and local officials, including the appointed ones, hold office at the Municipal Town Hall. The legislative and executive departments perform their functions in the Sangguniang Bayan (Session Hall) and Municipal Trial Court, respectively, and are in the Town Hall.

== Churches ==
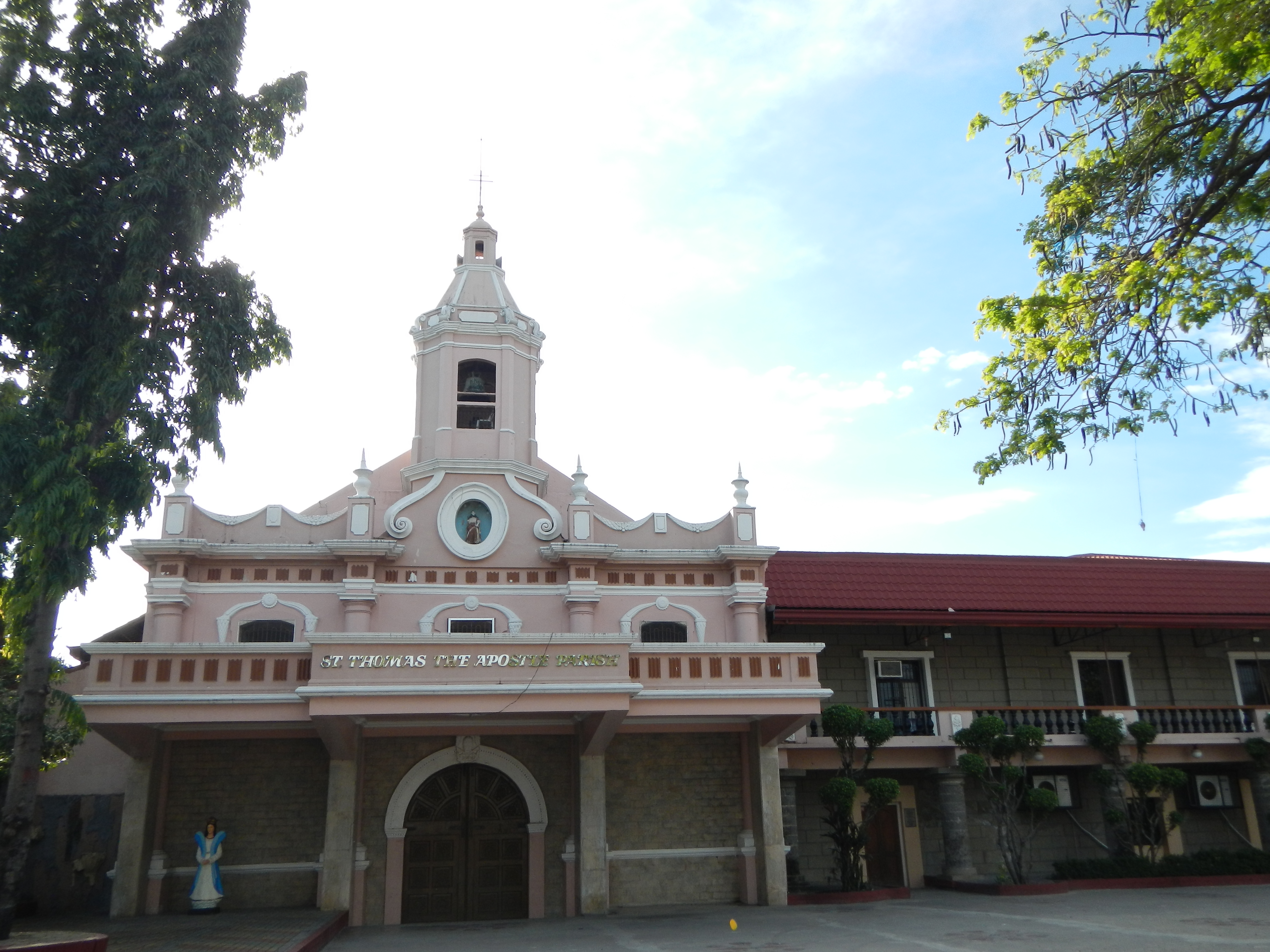
St. Thomas The Apostle Church

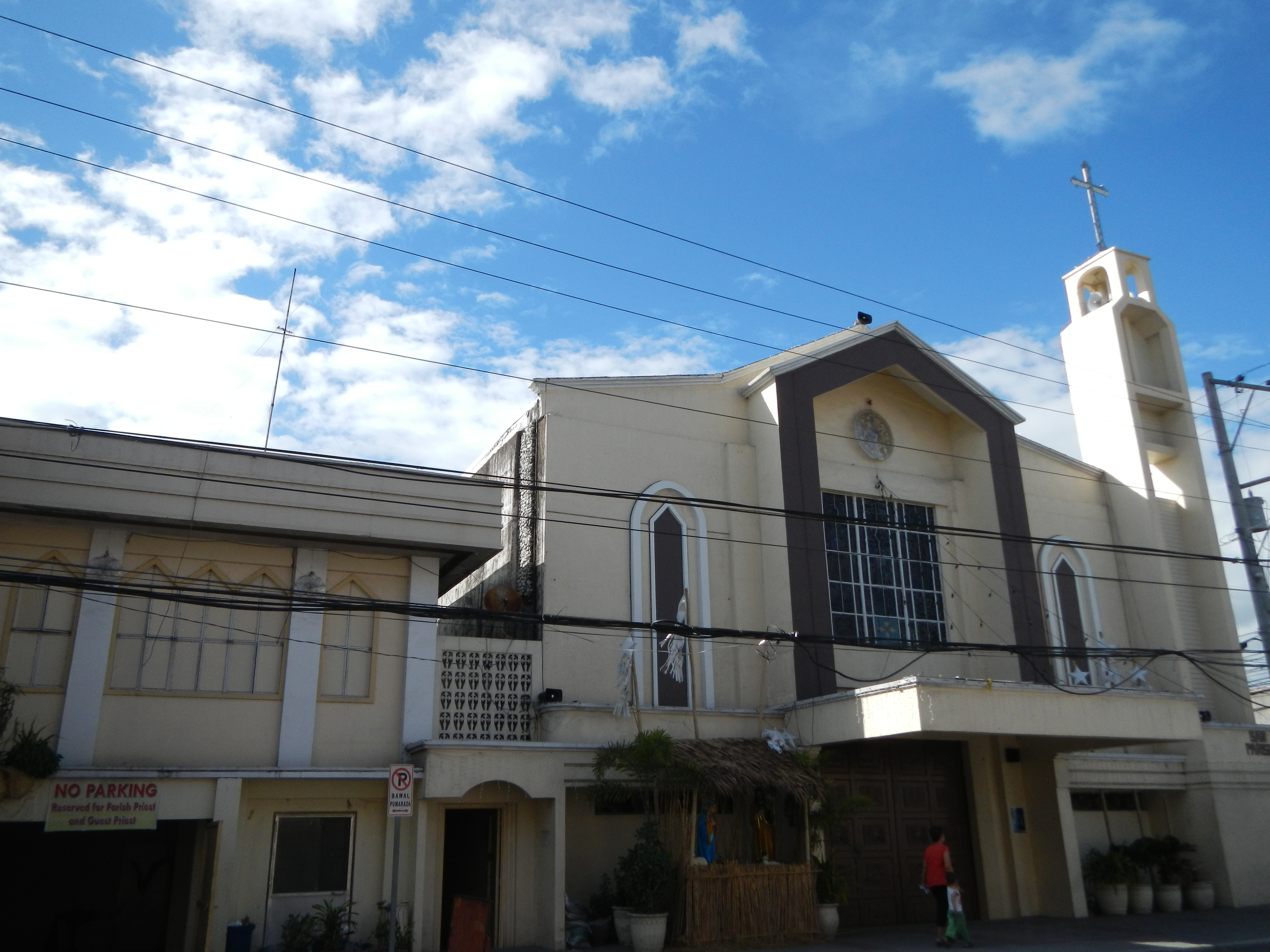
San Matias Parish Church

=== Santo Tomas Apostol Parish ===
The 1767 Santo Tomas Apostol Parish (Santo Tomas, Pampanga) belongs to the Roman Catholic Archdiocese of San Fernando. The feast is celebrated every Easter Sunday and the patronal feast is July 3 and its current Parish Priest was Rev. Fr. Alfredo I. David. The parish is belongs to the Vicariate of Christ the King Its parochial jurisdiction covers the chapels from Barangay San Vicente, Barangay San Bartolome, Northville 12 and Barangay Mesalipit of Bacolor, Pampanga and has a population of 20,202, with Roman Catholics of 19,833 as of 2020.

On February 14, 2004, the Parish Pastoral Center and Convent were blessed and inaugurated by Bishop Paciano Aniceto. On October 16, 2004, the new columbarium, mortuary and museum were blessed.

=== San Matias Apostol Parish ===
The 1962 San Matias Apostol Parish Church belongs to the Roman Catholic Archdiocese of San Fernando. The parish priest is Rev. Fr. Ronnie D. Cao, and the parish belongs to the Vicariate of Christ the King. The parochial jurisdiction covers the chapels in Barangay Santo Nino Sapa, Barangay Moras dela Paz East and West, Sitio Balangcas, Sitio Culubong and has a population of 16,672 with Roman Catholics of 16,005 as of 2020. The feast is celebrated every May 14 meanwhile the original feast of February 24 (February 25 during leap year) was declared as Barangay Day.

=== Our Lady of the Holy Rosary Parish ===
The 1991 Our Lady of the Holy Rosary Parish located in Barangay Santo Rosario Pau is the youngest and third parish in the town. Its current parish priest is Rev. Fr. Jaycar Z. Silva. This parish also belongs to the Vicariate of Christ the King. The parochial jurisdiction covers the chapels in Barangay Pandaras in San Fernando, Pampanga and chapels in Barangays Dela Paz, San Pablo Libutad, San Pablo Propio and Nayong Tsinoy in San Simon, and Barangay Santo Rosario Pau of Santo Tomas, where the parish is located.

== Education ==
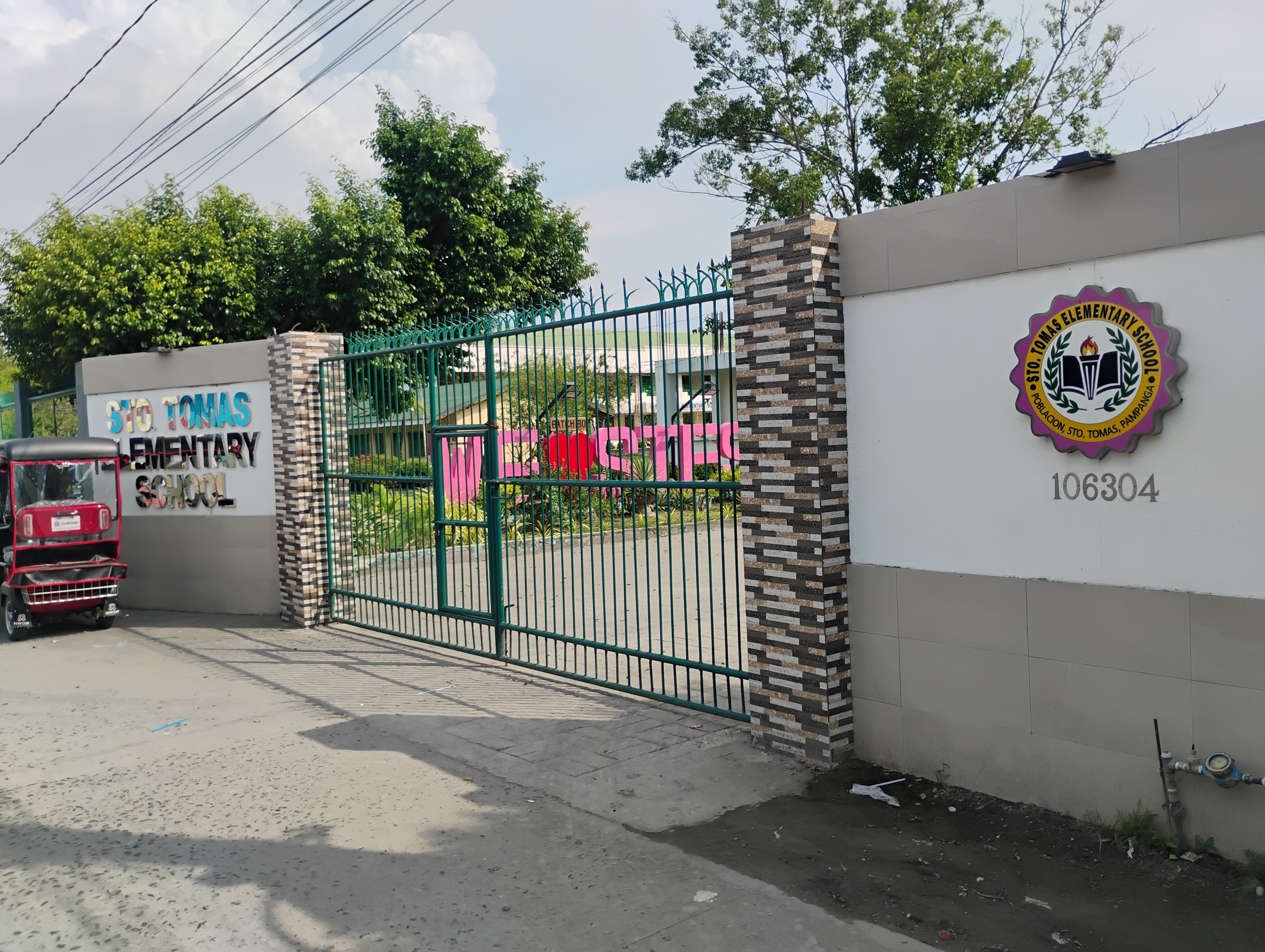
Santo Tomas Elementary School

The Sto. Tomas Schools District Office governs all educational institutions within the municipality. It oversees the management and operations of all private and public, from primary to secondary schools.

=== Primary and elementary schools ===
- Balangcas Elementary School
- Matinian School
- Moras Dela Paz Elementary School
- San Bartolome Elementary School
- San Matias Elementary School
- San Vicente Elementary School
- Sapa Elementary School
- Sto. Rosario Elementary School
- Sto. Tomas Elementary School

=== Secondary schools ===
- San Matias National High School
- Sto. Tomas National High School

=== Higher education insitutions ===
- Pampanga State University - Santo Tomas Campus
