= St. Thomas Aquinas Church (Fairfield, Connecticut) =

Coordinates: 41°08′26.74″N 73°15′42.41″W

- St. Thomas Aquinas Church
- Location: 1719 Post Road; Fairfield, Connecticut
- Country: United States
- Denomination: Roman Catholic
- Website: www.stthomasfairfield.com

History
- Founded: 1876

Architecture
- Architect: Polak and Sullivan

Administration
- Province: Hartford
- Diocese: Bridgeport
- Parish: St. Thomas Aquinas Parish

Clergy
- Bishop: Most Rev. Frank J. Caggiano
- Pastor: Rev. Victor T. Martin

St. Thomas Aquinas is a Roman Catholic church in Fairfield, Connecticut, in the Diocese of Bridgeport. The present Colonial-style church was designed by Polak and Sullivan of New Haven, CT.

== History ==
In the early 1850s Rev. Thomas Synnott, of the Church of St. James in Bridgeport would visit Fairfield and celebrate Mass at the home of one of the local Catholics. Synnott erected a frame building seating about 300 and in June 1854 it was dedicated by Bishop Bernard O'Rielly of Hartford, under the patronage of St. Thomas Aquinas. The parish was a mission of St. James in Bridgeport, and then of its successor St. Augustine's.

In January 1876, Rev. Martin P. Lawlor became the first resident pastor. In December 1876, Lawlor, who divided his time between Fairfield and Westport, was succeeded by Rev. Thomas Mullen. The following August, the thirty-two year old Mullen died suddenly of a heart condition after completing some sick calls. Rev. Denis Cremin became pastor in 1879. He relocated the church to another lot, adding a basement. It was rededicated in November 1880. Cremin purchased an adjacent house, which was renovated for use as a convent and school. The school opened in 1882, staffed by the Sister of Mercy. Cremin resided in a rented house until 1883 when he was made pastor of Sacred Heart Church in Bridgeport. His successor Thomas J. Coleman built a rectory. On the night of January 19, 1892 the church, convent, and rectory were destroyed in a fire. Services were held at the Town Hall for several months.

A new brick church building in Romanesque style with a seating capacity of 650 was dedicated on Thanksgiving Day, November 27, 1894. In 1956 the second St. Thomas Church was demolished began and the parish hall used as a chapel. The new St. Thomas Church was dedicated by Bishop Lawrence Shehan of Bridgeport on February 24, 1957.

== Present day ==
St. Thomas Aquinas Church is known for its fine acoustics, and has been the site of concerts by The Mendelssohn Choir of Connecticut and the Fairfield County Children's Choir. The parish hosts an annual Lenten Fish Fry Dinner, "a community event for the people throughout the Town of Fairfield and the surrounding towns." Another annual event is the Holiday Craft Fair and Tag Sale hosted by the Knights of Columbus Father Coleman Council #2616 Columbiette's Auxiliary in the parish gym.

The adjacent convent property was converted to an assisted living facility for seniors.

== School ==
St. Thomas Aquinas School was built in 1921. The school runs an After School Care Program offering supervised recreational activities, and time for homework and study. St. Thomas Aquinas Catholic School is accredited by the New England Association of Schools and Colleges.
