= St. Thomas the Apostle (disambiguation) =

Saint Thomas the Apostle was one of the twelve disciples of Jesus.

It may also refer to:

== Places ==
- St Thomas the Apostle, London, parish church in the City of London, destroyed in 1666
- St Thomas, Exeter, a large civil parish in Devon, England
- St Thomas the Apostle Rural, a civil parish in east Cornwall, United Kingdom

== Other ==
- St. Thomas' Church (disambiguation), multiple churches with the name
- St Thomas the Apostle College, a Roman Catholic secondary school for boys in Nunhead, London.
- St. Thomas the Apostle Minor Seminary, a preparatory seminary of the Roman Catholic Diocese of Faisalabad in Pakistan
