= Holy Trinity Church, Thorpe Thewles =

Former church in Thorpe Thewles, County Durham, England

Coordinates: 54.6052°N 1.3791°W

Holy Trinity Church was a church in the village of Thorpe Thewles, County Durham, England before being demolished in the late 1800s.

It was built in 1848–49 to replace an isolated church on a different site which had been dedicated to Thomas à Becket. The Thomas à Becket church is now in ruins and is recorded in the National Heritage List for England as a designated Grade I listed building. It is also a scheduled monument.

Holy Trinity Church was designed by the Lancaster architects Sharpe and Paley at an estimated cost of £600, and could seat 175 people. It measured 68 feet (20.7 m) by 23 feet 6 inches (7.2 m) but by the 1880s it was suffering from decay and damp, and was demolished.

It was replaced on the same site in 1886–87 by the present church, dedicated to St James. This church is a Grade II listed building.

== See also ==
- List of works by Sharpe and Paley
