= St Thomas à Becket Church =

St Thomas à Becket Church may refer to many churches in the United Kingdom, named for Saint Thomas of Canterbury, also known as Thomas Becket or Thomas à Becket, and St Thomas the Martyr.

- St Thomas à Becket Church, Widcombe, Bath
- Church of St Thomas à Becket, Box, Wiltshire
- Church of St Thomas à Becket, Bridford, Devon
- St Thomas the Martyr, Bristol
- Church of St Thomas à Becket, Burton Coggles, Lincolnshire
- St Thomas of Canterbury Church, Canterbury, Kent
- Church of St Thomas à Becket, Capel, Kent
- St Thomas of Canterbury Church, Chester
- Church of St Thomas of Canterbury, Clapham, Bedfordshire
- Church of St Thomas, Dudley, West Midlands
- St Thomas of Canterbury, Elsfield, Oxfordshire
- Church of St Thomas à Becket, Fairfield, Kent
- Church of St Thomas à Becket, Heptonstall, West Yorkshire
- St Thomas' Church, Southwark, London
- Church of St Thomas the Martyr, Newcastle upon Tyne
- Sts Thomas Minster, Newport, Isle of Wight, which may ambiguously have St Thomas à Becket or St Thomas the Apostle as its patron
- Church of St Thomas à Becket, Newton Tracey
- St Thomas à Becket Church, Northaw
- St Thomas the Martyr's Church, Oxford
- St Thomas à Becket Church, Pensford, Somerset
- Cathedral Church of St Thomas of Canterbury, commonly known as Portsmouth Cathedral, Portsmouth
- St Thomas à Becket Church, Puddington, Devon
- Church of St Thomas à Becket, Pylle, Somerset
- Church of St Thomas à Becket, Ramsey, Cambridgeshire
- Church of St Thomas a Becket, Shirenewton, Monmouthshire
- Church of St Thomas à Becket, South Cadbury, Somerset
- Church of St Thomas à Becket, Sutton-under-Brailes, Warwickshire
- Church of St Thomas à Becket, Tilshead, Wiltshire
- Church of St Thomas the Martyr, Up Holland, Lancashire
- St Thomas à Becket Church, Warblington, Hampshire
- Church of St Thomas à Becket, Wolvesnewton, Monmouthshire
- a church ruin and Grade I listed building replaced by Holy Trinity Church, Thorpe Thewles

== See also ==
- Chapel of St Thomas on the Bridge, London
- St Thomas à Becket Chapel, Milford Haven, Pembrokeshire
- Beauchief Abbey, South Yorkshire, dedicated to Saints Mary and Thomas à Becket
- Newark Priory, Surrey, dedicated to Saints Mary and Thomas à Becket
- Wymondham Abbey, Norfolk, dedicated to Saints Mary and Thomas à Becket (the latter replacing Saint Alban after Becket's murder in 1170)
- Holy Trinity Church, Thorpe Thewles, County Durham, the predecessor of which was dedicated to Saint Thomas à Becket
