= St. Thomas Church (Brownsville, Texas) =

Church building in Texas, United States

Coordinates: 25°54′35.7″N 97°30′11″W

St. Thomas Church is a Catholic church located in the city of Brownsville, Texas, United States. The church is currently a mission of the Immaculate Conception Cathedral which is also in Brownsville, Texas.
