= St Thomas' Church, Preston =

Coordinates: 53.7666°N 2.7036°W

St Thomas Centre
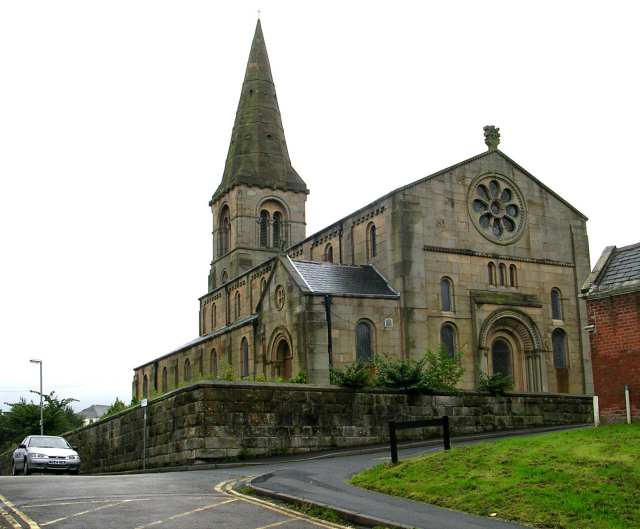
- St Thomas' Church, Preston, from the northwest

- Location within Preston
- OS grid reference: SD 537 302
- Location: Lancaster Road, Preston, Lancashire
- Country: England
- Denomination: Pentecostal
- Website: www.citychurchpreston.com

History
- Former name(s): St Thomas' Church, Preston

Architecture
- Heritage designation: Grade II
- Designated: 27 September 1979
- Architect: John Latham
- Architectural type: Church
- Style: Romanesque Revival
- Groundbreaking: 1837
- Completed: 1839
- Construction cost: £4,500

Clergy
- Pastor: Revd Paul Counsell

St Thomas' Church is in Lancaster Road, Preston, Lancashire, England. It has historically been an Anglican parish church, and now used by City Church Preston, an AOG GB church. The church is recorded in the National Heritage List for England as a designated Grade II listed building.

== History ==
The church was designed by John Latham and built between 1837 and 1839 at a cost of £4,500. When first built the church could seat about 1,100 people. It is recorded in 1869 that near the entrance to the church was a curtained pew that was occupied by Edward Hermon, the local Member of Parliament. The church was declared redundant on 1 November 1983. In May 1987 it was in "civic, cultural or community" use, and from 6 February 2001 it has been used for "worship by other Christian bodies". From 2014 it was the Preston Elim Pentecostal Church. From 2018 it became known as St Thomas Centre, after it was purchased and used by City Church Preston. City Church Preston has a significant diaspora from Southern Asia. and now runs two services. One in English and an evening one in Tamil. City Church Preston also has been recognised by the AoG as a long time member celebrating over 100yrs. City Church Preston uses the funds it generates from donations to fund ministries in Central Africa, East Europe, USA and the Philippines.

== Architecture ==
St Thomas' is built in sandstone with slate roofs, and is mainly in Romanesque Revival (Norman) style; all the openings are round-headed. The church consists of a six-bay nave with a clerestory, north and south aisles, and a chancel with a five-sided apse, which is flanked by north and south vestries. Above the chancel is a three-stage tower with a window on each side of the middle stage and two-light bell openings in the top stage. Surmounting the tower is a broach spire. In the lower part of the west front is a window in a Norman-style surround flanked by windows in two tiers. Above this is a three-light window, and in the gable is a wheel window. The wheel window is currently undertaking restoration work thanks to the funds raised by City Church Preston. There are doorways on each side of the church in the western bay of the aisles, the north doorway being gabled. The other bays along the sides of the aisles and the bays of the clerestory are divided by pilasters, and each contains a window. There is also a window in each side of the apse. Inside the church the arcades are carried on cylindrical piers. The interior of the church has been divided by the insertion of an upper floor. Due to anti social behaviour, the ministry team reached out to local Architectural Assistant, Scott Hartley BSc, whilst he was studying architecture at the University of Central Lancashire. With the help of Hartley the City Church Preston team achieved planning permission for a perimeter fence to help protect the church. Few of the building's original windows survive, however, a window above where the old altar used to be, depicts Jesus Christ and is dated to 1907.

== Appraisal ==
The church was designated as a Grade II listed building on 27 September 1979. Grade II is the lowest of the three grades of listing and is applied to "buildings of national importance and special interest". Hartwell and Pevsner in the Buildings of England series state that the church "is indeed an odd creature", commenting that although it is mainly Norman in style, the broach spire is not a Norman feature, and that the site of the tower, and the polygonal apse, are not typical of the Norman style. A. Hewitson, writing in 1869, described the church as a "small, strong, hard-looking building".

== See also ==
- Listed buildings in Preston, Lancashire
