= St. Thomas's Church (Rateče) =

Church building in Kranjska Gora, Slovenia

Coordinates: 46°29′46.77″N 13°42′52.57″E

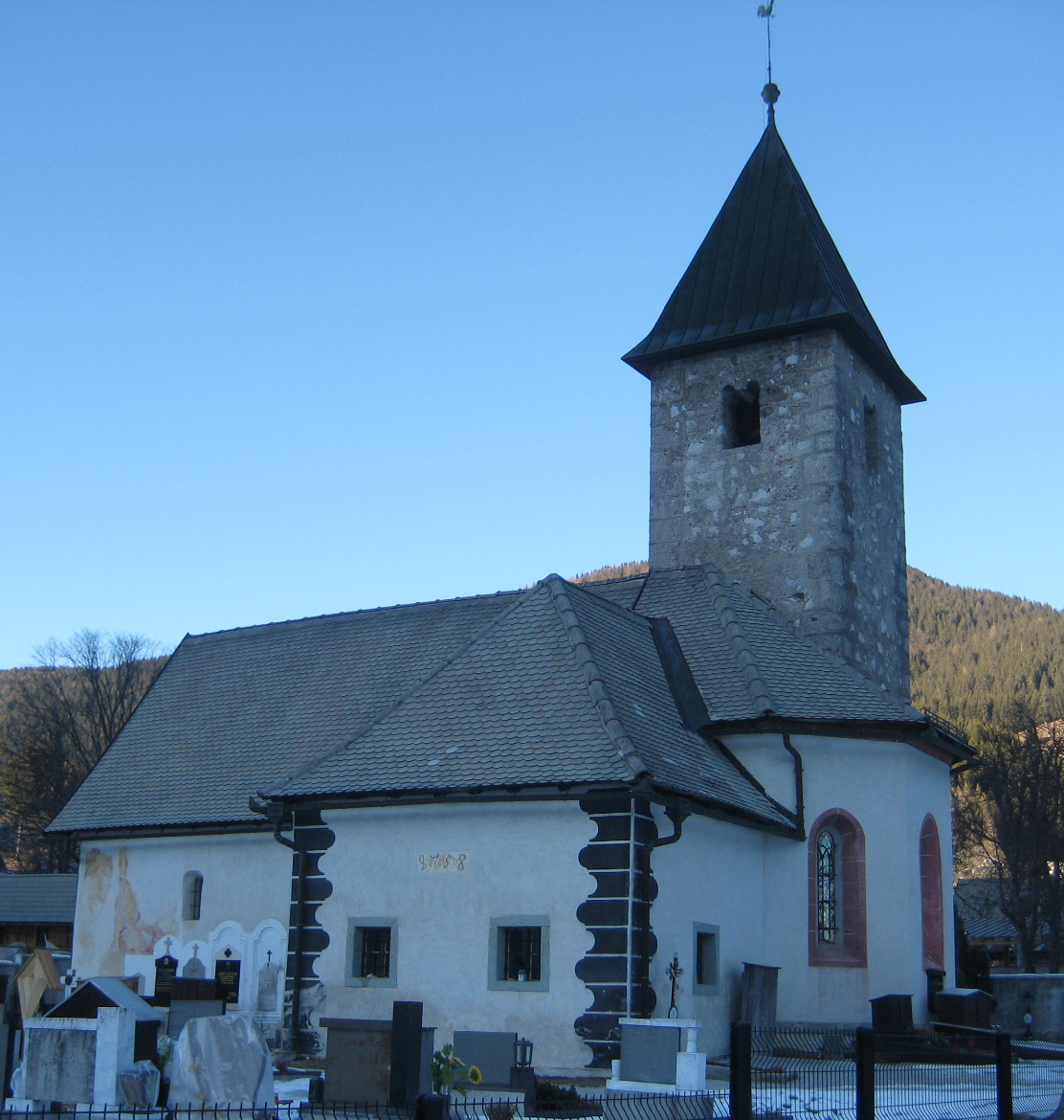
St. Thomas's Church

St. Thomas's Church in Rateče, Kranjska Gora, Slovenia, is one of the oldest churches in the upper Sava Valley, confirmed by written documents and excavations as well as the church's original furnishings.

The oldest written document mentioning Rateče is the Vidimus (from Latin: "we saw") by the first Ljubljana Bishop Sigmund Lamberg, which is preserved today in the kapitelj archive of the Ljubljana archdiocesan archives. It is a parchment document created at the time of Bishop Lamberg's visit to Kranjska Gora and is dated January 28, 1467. The Vidimus is a transcript of three manuscripts from the year 1390 (dated May 30, November 12, and December 8) addressing a change in the parish to which the church in Rateče belonged. The church, which until that time had been an affiliate church of the parish of Maria Gail (Slovene: Marija na Zilji) near Villach (Beljak) in Carinthia, was taken from that parish and transferred to the parish of Kranjska Gora in Carniola under a grant by the regent Count Frederick III of Ortenburg. On 8 December 1390, Jan Soběslav, the Patriarch of Aquileia confirmed this change.

An even older but undated document is the so-called Rateče or Klagenfurt Manuscript, one of the oldest written documents in Slovene. It contains the prayers Our father, Hail Mary and the Apostles' Creed. It is written on parchment paper with ornamented initial letters in red and blue. It was discovered in 1880 at Klagenfurt in Carinthia, where it is kept in the archives of the Carinthian Historical Society. On the basis of linguistic analysis and information taken from Bishop Lamberg's Vidimus, historian Ivan Grafenauer claims that the document was created around the year 1370. His determination is that it was written around that time; the words it contains, however, point to roots dating back to the 8th century. The document was bound into a mass book, used by the vicar from Maria Gail on his visits to Rateče.

On the back cover of the same manuscript there is another written record, which contains the names of the members of the Brotherhood of the Mother of God in 1467. Among them are the names of priests (Nikolaj of Naklo) and a number of surnames which are still found among inhabitants of Rateče today (Pintbah and Rogar, among others).

Between 1972 and 1976 archeological digs were carried out under the church's foundation. Upon uncovering the late medieval stone floor, the archeologists discovered the foundation of a semicircular Romanesque apse in the sanctuary. On the south side of the nave, even older wall foundations were uncovered, which might suggest a pre-Romanesque phase of construction. In another area of the nave, a fragment of a ceramic jug typical of the Roman era was found. In the sanctuary the excavators also found 25 preserved Roman-era graves with accompanying burial items. The method of burial suggests early Slovenian customs. Romanesque elements were found in the walls of the nave as well, A Romanesque window from the 12th or early 13th century was uncovered in the south wall. In the middle of this wall was also found an entrance with a wooden beam which was scorched by a fire in 1693.

The church has a Gothic sanctuary, which replaced the Romanesque sanctuary in the mid-15th century. Adjacent to it is a Romanesque bell tower, which some have dated to 1360; in any case, it clearly was built in the 14th century. It houses a bell from the year 1521, on which is written in Gothic minuscule: + iesus + maria + anno + XXI + lucas + marcus + ioannes + matheus. In the belfry there is also a steel bell, which was cast in a foundry in Jesenice and blessed on February 22, 1922. Its pitch is C and it weighs 242 kg. As of October 1, 2000, it is flanked by two bronze bells (weighing 198 kg and 136 kg), which were cast by the bell specialists in Passau, Germany. They were consecrated by the archbishop of Belgrade, Msgr. Stanislav Hočevar.
