= Cathedral of Saint Thomas =

Cathedral of Saint Thomas may refer to:

== India ==
=== Catholic ===
- St. Thomas Syro-Malabar Cathedral, Kalyan
- St. Thomas Cathedral, Balharshah
- St. Thomas Cathedral Basilica, Chennai
- St. Thomas Cathedral, Pala
- St Thomas Cathedral & Bishop House, Irinjalakuda

=== Anglican ===
- St. Thomas Cathedral, Mumbai

=== Orthodox Syrian ===
- St. Thomas Cathedral, Thottamon, Kerala

== Malaysia ==
- St. Thomas's Cathedral, Kuching

== Sri Lanka ==
- St. Thomas' Cathedral, Vaddukoddai

== Venezuela ==
- St. Thomas Cathedral, Ciudad Bolívar

== United States ==
- Mar Thoma Shleeha Cathedral (Bellwood, Illinois)
- St. Toma Syriac Catholic Cathedral, Farmington Hills, Michigan
