= St. Thomas Mar Thoma Church, Pallipad =

Church in Kerala, India

St. Thomas Mar Thoma Church, Pallipad is a church in Pallipad, Kerala, India. Called "Pallipad Valia Pally", the current structure was built in 1933. The congregation numbers more than 1200 members. Mar Thoma Valia Palli, pride of Pallipad, is a symbol of faith and determination, completed 100 years of glorious spiritual service. As a part of centenary celebration, a newly build Function Hall (Parish Hall) was dedicated to public on 1 September 2007.

Pallipad St. Thomas Mar Thoma Church has a total of about 265 families with more than 1200 members, primarily focused on serving the spiritual needs of Mar Thoma Christians which spreads throughout Pallipad and Haripad. This church plays an important role in passing our faith and beliefs to our future generation through Fellowship, Prayer and Worship under the vision of Mar Thoma Church.

In the early days of the 19th century, the Christian believers at Pallipad area had to walk nearly six kilometers to reach the Syrian Church at Cheppad to attend the church services. The long distance to the place of worship had been a problem for many believers to attend the church services regularly. Naturally a genuine desire arose among the believers to have a parish established at Pallipad. Consequently, on Kumbham 2, 1042 Rt. Rev. Mathews Mar Athanasius, Palakkunneth laid the foundation stone for the present St. George Orthodox Church at Pallipad. During those days the Church reformation movement led by Rev. Abraham Malpan Achen gained momentum and many families joined the movement. On Vrichikam 28, 1066 the newly formed reformation group bought "Thachayil Purayidam" and constructed a small building to conduct prayer fellowship. But on Kanni 13, 1082 as per the judgment of the civil court the reformation group lost the right of use of the church as well as the land they bought. At that difficult situation Perkattu Rev. P. V. Koshy Kathanar rose to the occasion and on his appeal at the superior court the Mar Thoma church won the land and the property back.

As the number of the Mar Thoma family increased to 135 a new place of worship was necessary. In 1908 the " Kattuparambil purayidam" was bought and a temporary building was constructed for worship. On 21 June 1908 Rt. Rev. Titus II celebrated the Holy Qurbana. As the number of families increased to 166 the parish council decided to construct a large church building. It took 25 years to complete and that church is what we have today, St. Thomas Mar Thoma Valiya Pally. The first vicar Perkattu Rev. P.V. Koshy Kathanar and his loving and dedicated parish members sacrificed a lot to construct this church building. On Makaram 28, 1127 Rt. Rev. Yuhannon Mar Themotheos consecrated the church.
