= St. Thomas the Apostle Catholic Church (Detroit) =

Historic church in Michigan, United States

- St. Thomas the Apostle Catholic Church and Rectory
- Formerly listed on the U.S. National Register of Historic Places
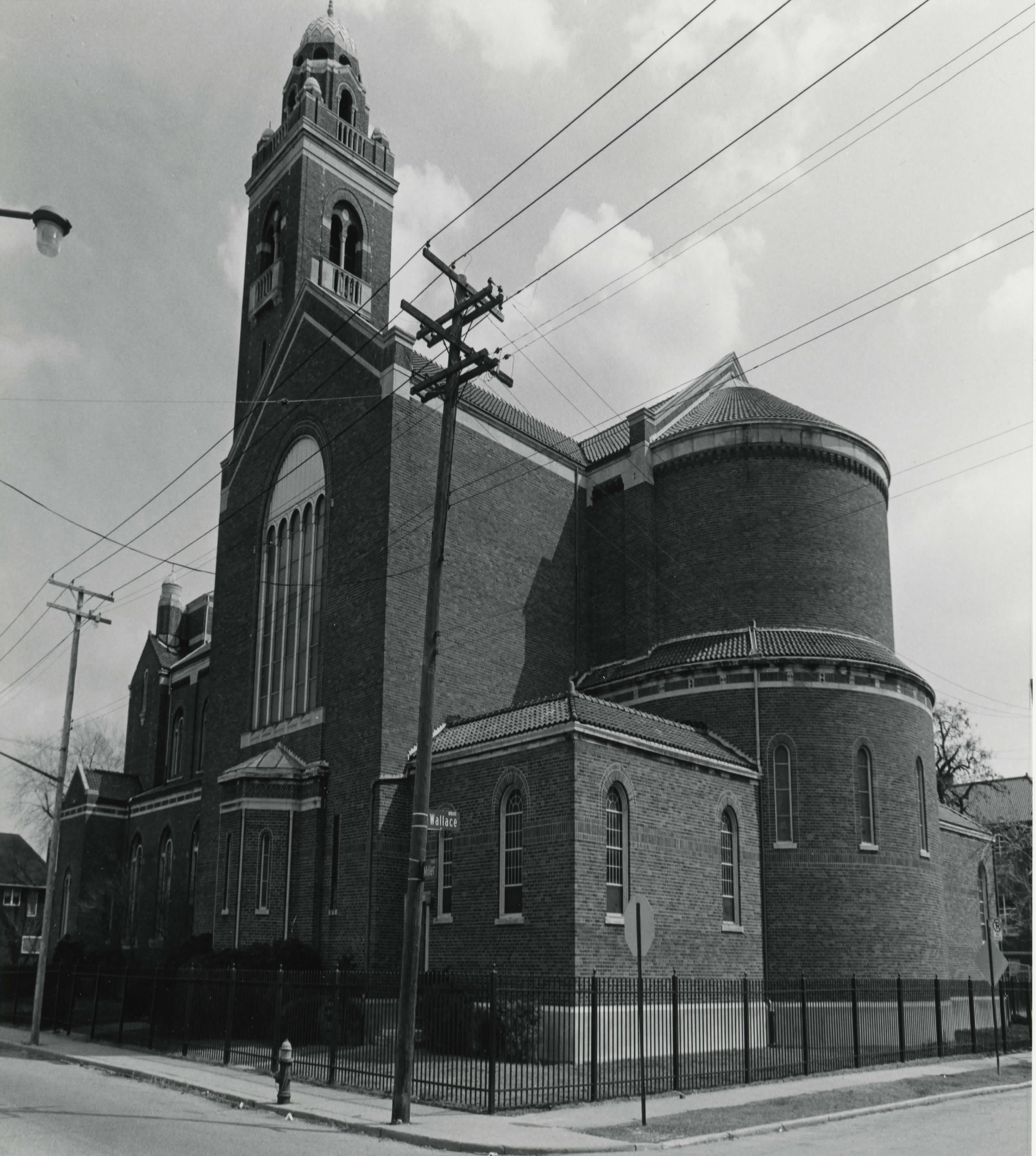
- St Thomas the Apostle, 1989
- Interactive map
- Location: 8363-8383 Townsend Avenue; Detroit, Michigan
- Coordinates: 42°23′24″N 83°1′28″W
- Built: 1923
- Architect: Van Leyen, Schilling & Keough
- Architectural style: Late 19th and 20th century revival
- Demolished: January 1992
- NRHP reference No.: 89000785

Significant dates
- Added to NRHP: June 29, 1989
- Removed from NRHP: July 24, 2024

St. Thomas the Apostle Catholic Church was a church located at 8363 and 8383 Townsend Avenue in Detroit, Michigan. It was listed on the National Register of Historic Places in 1989, but was subsequently demolished. and removed from the National Register of Historic Places in 2024.

== History ==
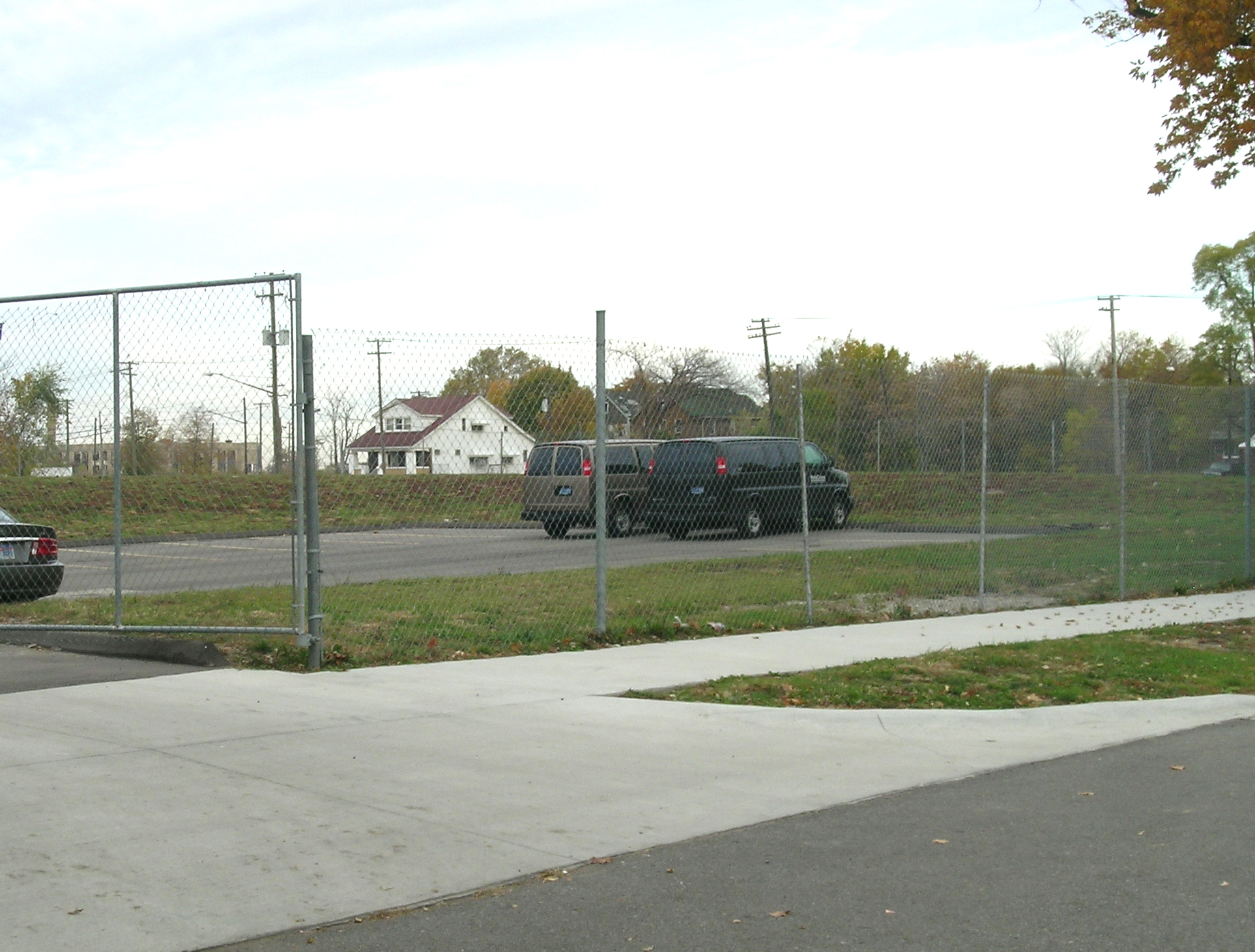
Parking lot/field where the church once stood

St. Thomas the Apostle Parish was a Polish-American Roman Catholic parish founded in 1914, at the eastern edge of the east side Polish neighborhoods of Detroit. A church was constructed in 1923, and the parish had both a grade school and a high school. The parish was one of the first to experience changes in population, as the original Polish residents began moving out in the mid-20th century. The parish was closed in 1989, and the church demolished in 1993.

The school currently serves as St. Thomas Assessment Center for troubled youths.

== Description ==
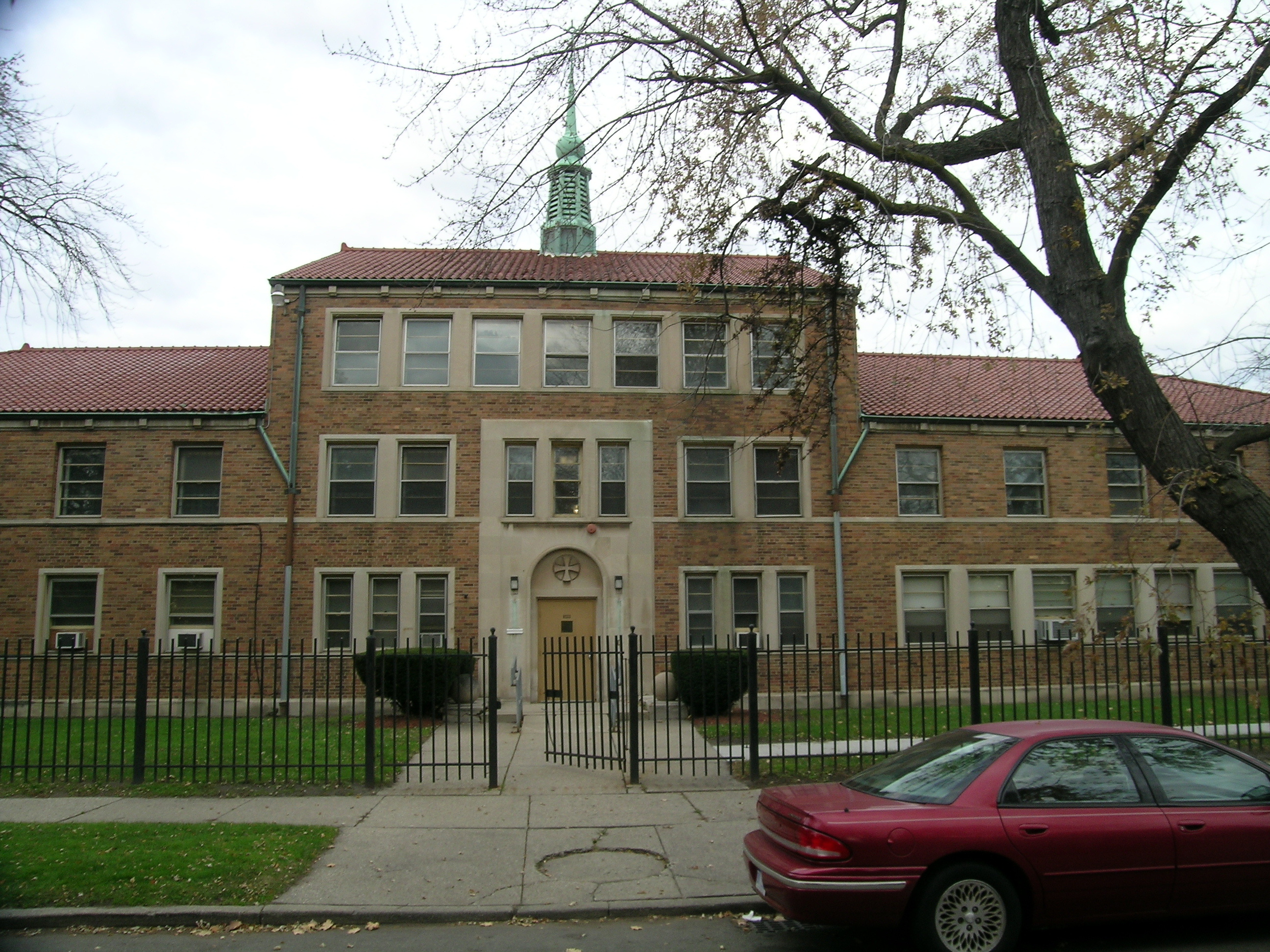
St. Thomas School

The parish complex at St. Thomas the Apostle comprised six buildings, including the church, rectory, school, and convent.

The church was essentially of Romanesque design, with some Art Deco aspects. It was built of brick laid over Dennison interlocking tile, sitting atop a limestone base. The building was trimmed with limestone and Tuscan glazed faience in various colors. The facade was a series of gable-roof blocks, roofed with Spanish tile. The primary entrance was through a central, side-gable block, sized to match the nave. The entrance was recessed into the center of a projecting porch and surrounded by columned arches. A massive Eucharistic relief was set high in the center of the facade. The church boasted a wealth of decorative art, including stained glass and bronze works.

The rectory was a large, two-story building with a dormer-attic.
