= Polak and Sullivan =

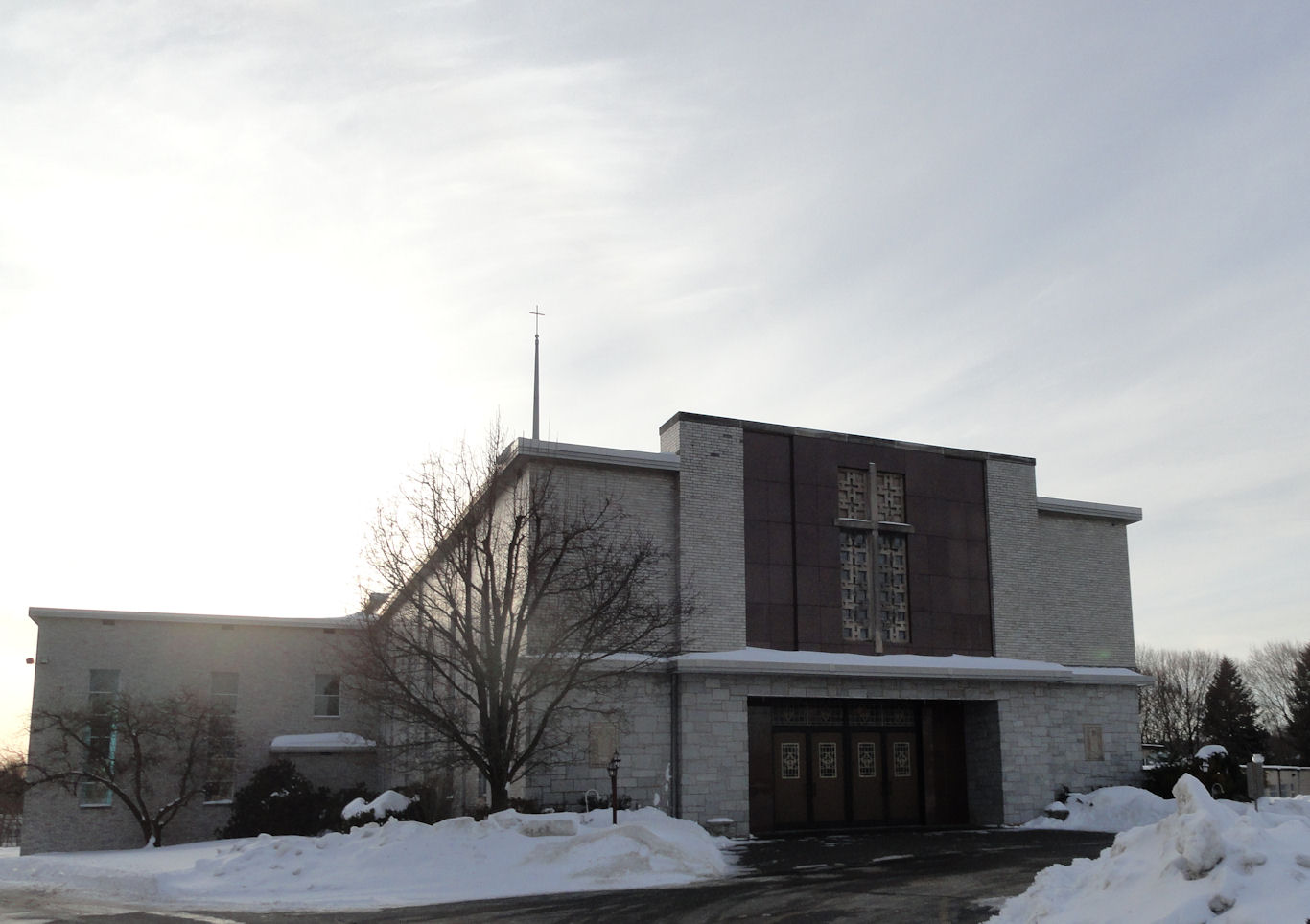
- St. Bridget Church Cheshire CT (rare International Style Catholic Church)

Polak and Sullivan was an American architectural firm that was active between 1935 and 1975. The New Haven, Connecticut, based organization concentrated on work for Roman Catholic clients in Connecticut.

== Architectural practice ==
The firm was a partnership between Howard J. Sullivan AIA and David Polak AIA (d. 1981). It was established shortly after Maurice F. McAuliffe was named the 8th Bishop of Hartford, a time that also coincided with the end of the long career of architect Joseph A. Jackson who was popular with Catholic clients. Bishop McAuliffe would go on to establish 25 new parishes and 9 parochial schools many of which were to be designed by Polak and Sullivan.

From a stylistic standpoint their output is extremely varied including at various times Romanesque Revival buildings, Gothic Revival buildings, Colonial buildings, Modern buildings and even a few buildings in International Style, which was rarely used for Roman Catholic churches.

In spite of their popularity with their clients there is surprisingly little information on this firm. Neither Polak nor Sullivan responded to AIA surveys conducted in 1956, 1962 and 1970. It does not appear that the firm was in any way associated with Yale University.

== Personal life ==
Howard Sullivan was a trustee of St. Bernadette Church, one of the first designed by his firm and a member of the Knights of Columbus. In 1956 he was the recipient of the Knights of Columbus 7th annual Charles Carroll of Carrollton Award for outstanding leadership.

For many years Sullivan was a member (along with fellow church architect J. Gerald Phelan) of the Architectural Registration Board of Connecticut, appointed by and reporting to the governor.

Sullivan also served as chairman for the Community Foundation for Greater New Haven between 1970 and 1977.

== Works include ==
- St. Mary Church, School and Convent Branford, CT
- St. Therese Church, Branford, CT
- Our Lady of Pompeii Church, East Haven, CT
- St. Vincent De Paul Church, East Haven, CT
- St. Thomas Aquinas Church, Fairfield, CT
- Blessed Sacrament Church, Hamden, CT
- St. Stephen Church, Hamden, CT
- St. Rita Church, Hamden, CT
- Our Lady of Mt. Carmel Church, Hamden, CT
- St. Mary Church, Milford, CT
- St. Maurice Church, New Britain, CT
- St. Bernadette Church, New Haven, CT
- St. Maurice Church, Stamford, CT
- Sts Peter and Paul Church, Waterbury, CT
- Convent of St. Peter Parish, Hartford, CT
- Our Lady of Victories Church, West Haven, CT
- St. Martin De Pores Church (alteration) and community housing, New Haven, CT
- St. Bridget Church, Cheshire, CT
- St. Ann Church, Bristol, CT
- St. Philip Church, East Windsor, Connecticut
- Holy Family Church, Enfield, Connecticut
- St. Luke Church, Hartford, Connecticut
- Assumption Church, Manchester, Connecticut
- St. Bartholomew Church, Manchester, Connecticut
- St. Ann Church, Milford, Connecticut
- St. Barnabas Church, North Haven, Connecticut
- Holy Infant Church, Orange, Connecticut
- St. John the Evalgelist Church, Watertown, Connecticut
- St. Bridget Church, West Hartford, Connecticut
- St. Paul Church West Haven, Connecticut
- Assumption Church, Woodbridge, Connecticut
- Our Lady of Fatima Church, Yalesville, Connecticut
- St. Agnes Church, Woodmont, Connecticut
- Archdiocese of Hartford Chancery building, Hartford, Connecticut
