= Saint Thomas the Apostle Church (Connecticut) =

Church of St. Thomas the Apostle
- Interactive map of the Church of St. Thomas the Apostle area

General information
- Architectural style: Gothic Revival
- Location: Norwalk, Connecticut, United States of America
- Construction started: Late 1940s
- Client: Roman Catholic Diocese of Bridgeport

Design and construction
- Architect: Edward F. Allodi

St. Thomas the Apostle Church
- St. Thomas the Apostle Church
- 41.1055°N 73.4044°W
- Location: 203 East Avenue; Norwalk, Connecticut
- Country: United States
- Denomination: Roman Catholic
- Website: http://stthomasnorwalk.com/

History
- Founded: 1935

Architecture
- Architect: Edward F. Allodi

Administration
- Province: Hartford
- Diocese: Bridgeport

Clergy
- Bishop: Most Rev. Frank Caggiano
- Vicar: Rev. Ralph Segura
- Pastor: Rev. Miroslaw Stachurski

St. Thomas the Apostle is a Roman Catholic church in Norwalk, Connecticut, part of the Diocese of Bridgeport. The Parish of St. Thomas the Apostle was established in 1935.

== Buildings ==
The present church built in the late 1940s. The architect was Edward F. Allodi of Cape Cod, Massachusetts, a graduate of the Columbia University School of Architecture. Allodi's Romanesque Revival building is remarkable for its time period as appears as though it could have been built 20 years earlier.

== History ==
In 2010 the Reverend Robert J. Crofut received the second annual John Swanhaus Award from the Order of Malta in an event hosted by Charles Grodin.
