= St Thomas Aquinas Church, Ham =

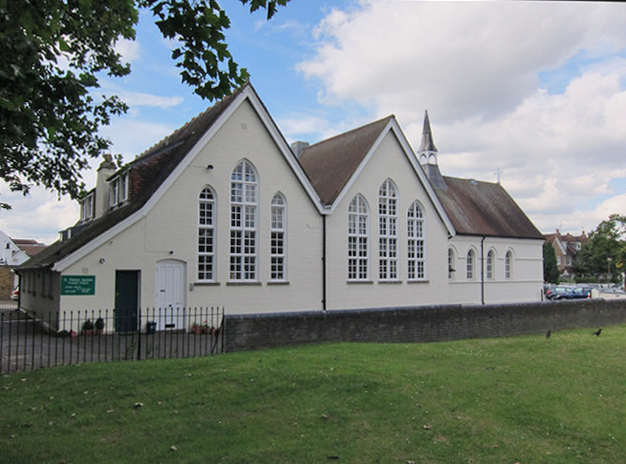
- St Thomas Aquinas Church, Ham
- 51°26′8.58″N 0°18′38.01″W
- OS grid reference: TQ 17528 72099
- Location: Ham Street, Ham, Richmond TW10 7HT
- Country: England
- Denomination: Roman Catholic
- Website: https://stthomasaquinasham.org/

History
- Former name: St. Andrew's School (or just Ham School)
- Status: Church
- Founded: 1968
- Consecrated: 28 January 1987

Architecture
- Functional status: Active
- Completed: 1890

Specifications
- Materials: brick and slate

Administration
- Province: Southwark
- Diocese: Roman Catholic Archdiocese of Southwark
- Deanery: Mortlake
- Parish: Ham

Clergy
- Priest: Fr Peter Andrews (Ordinariate OLW)

St Thomas Aquinas Church, Ham is a Roman Catholic church on Ham Street on the western corner of Ham Common, Ham, in the London Borough of Richmond upon Thames. The church is a former 19th-century school building, acquired in 1968 and converted for worship and community use.

== Services ==
Mass is held on Saturday evenings and on Sunday mornings. During the COVID-19 pandemic, mass has been held online via Zoom and later using YouTube. There has also been daily rosaries held at 8:30pm remotely.

There is also a mass in German on Sunday mornings to accommodate the local German-speaking population. (The German School London is nearby in Petersham.) A German priest is sent by the German-speaking church of St Boniface in Whitechapel, London, to hold mass. The German-speaking congregation also meets with the Lutheran German-speaking congregation at St Andrew's Church, Ham for ecumenical services.

== History ==
=== School ===
The building was constructed as Ham School in the late 1880s, replacing an earlier village school funded by the National Society. This early school accommodated boys in St Andrew's Church on the opposite side of Ham Common, and girls in the converted first floor of nearby almshouses. This failed to meet the new standards required by the Elementary Education Act 1870. Faced with the unpopular prospect of having a state controlled Board school imposed upon them, local ratepayers established a committee to construct a new school. Funds were raised from local charities, subscriptions and the National Society and the building opened in 1890 as St Andrew's School. Built with capacity for 100 boys, 101 infants and 101 girls, the school remained open until 1966, when it was replaced by the larger St Richard's with St Andrew's Primary School. The building was used for various community functions throughout the late 1960s and early 1970s.

=== Church ===
From the Reformation until 1856 there was nowhere for Catholics to worship in Ham. Between 1856 and 1870 a small chapel, St Mary's, was established in the grounds of Beaufort House, to the north along Ham Street. In 1952 a small plot further north in Ham Street, where 201–7 now stand, was bought by Richard and Mary Cave and the Chapel of Ease of St Elizabeth's, Richmond, was constructed there. The first Mass was celebrated on 18 January 1953 but the dedication to St Thomas Aquinas was not made until 22 February 1953, by Bishop Cowderoy. Intended as a temporary structure, the "tin hut" served until the former Ham School site was acquired in 1968. The northern part of the former school building became the church whilst the southern section became the church hall, still used by community groups. The first Mass was celebrated on 14 October 1968. A flat was built in 1985 for the use of the resident parish priest, Canon Frank Davys, when St Thomas's became a parish in its own right. The church was consecrated on 28 January 1987 by Reverend Michael Bowen, the Archbishop of Southwark.

The single light stained glass window by Paul Quail, depicting "Heavenly Jerusalem", was added in 1990.

== Parish Priests ==
Start	End	Name	
1968	1991	Canon Frank Davys	Retired.
1991	1997	Canon George Telford	Died November 1997
1998	2004	Fr Michael George Clifton	Retired.
2004	2016	Fr Walter Walsh	Retired
2016	2021	Fr Robert Ellis	Died October 2021
2021	2022	Fr Julian Shurgold	Left January 2022
2022	2025	Fr Stephen Langridge	Parish Priest, also of St Elizabeth's Richmond.
2022	2023	Fr Tomasz Margol	Assistant Priest. Left August 2023
2023	2025	Fr. George Segun Ajana	Assistant Priest. September 2023 to August 2025
2025		Fr. Antony Arulraj	Parochial Administrator. Arrived September 2025

== Gallery ==
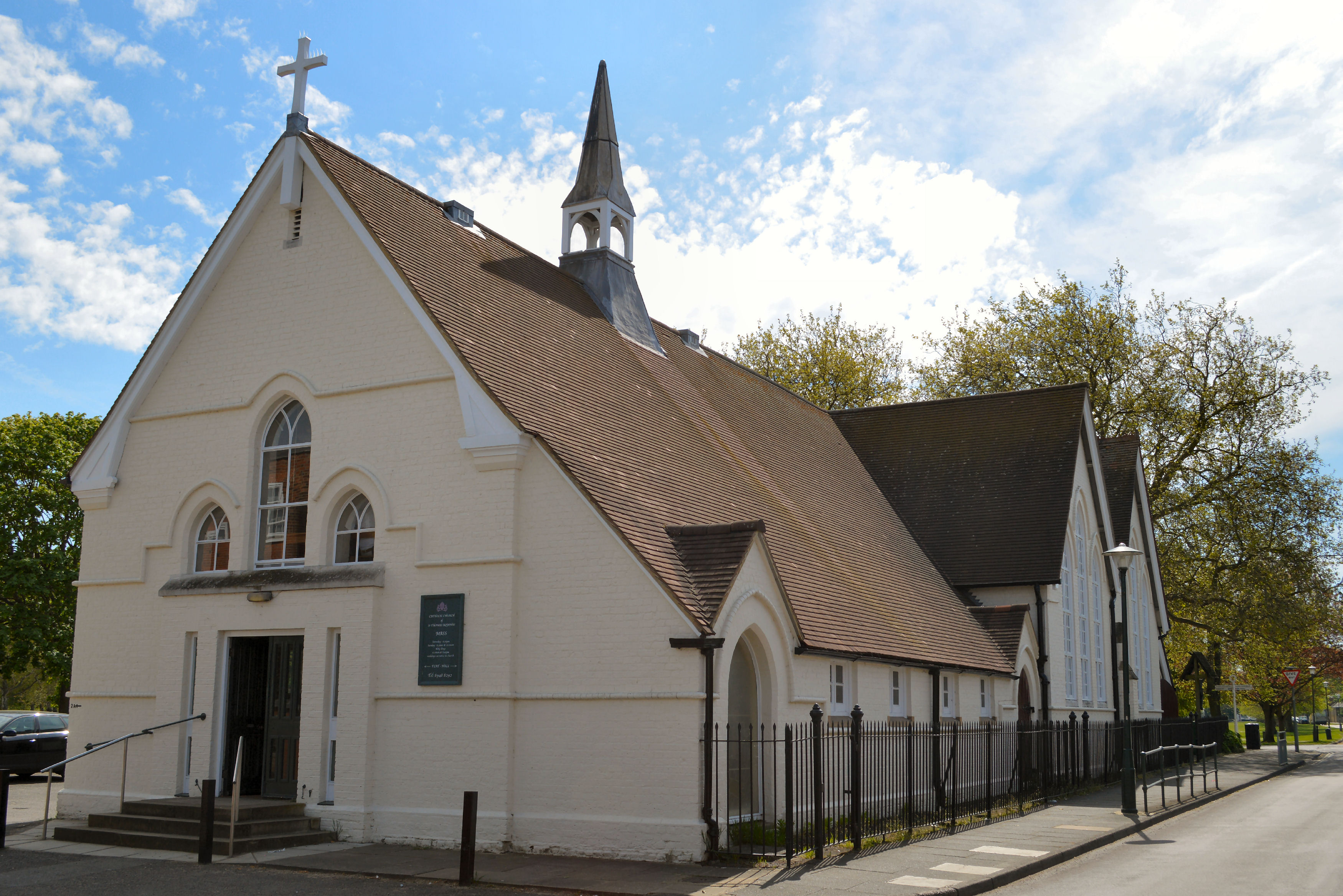
From Ham Street

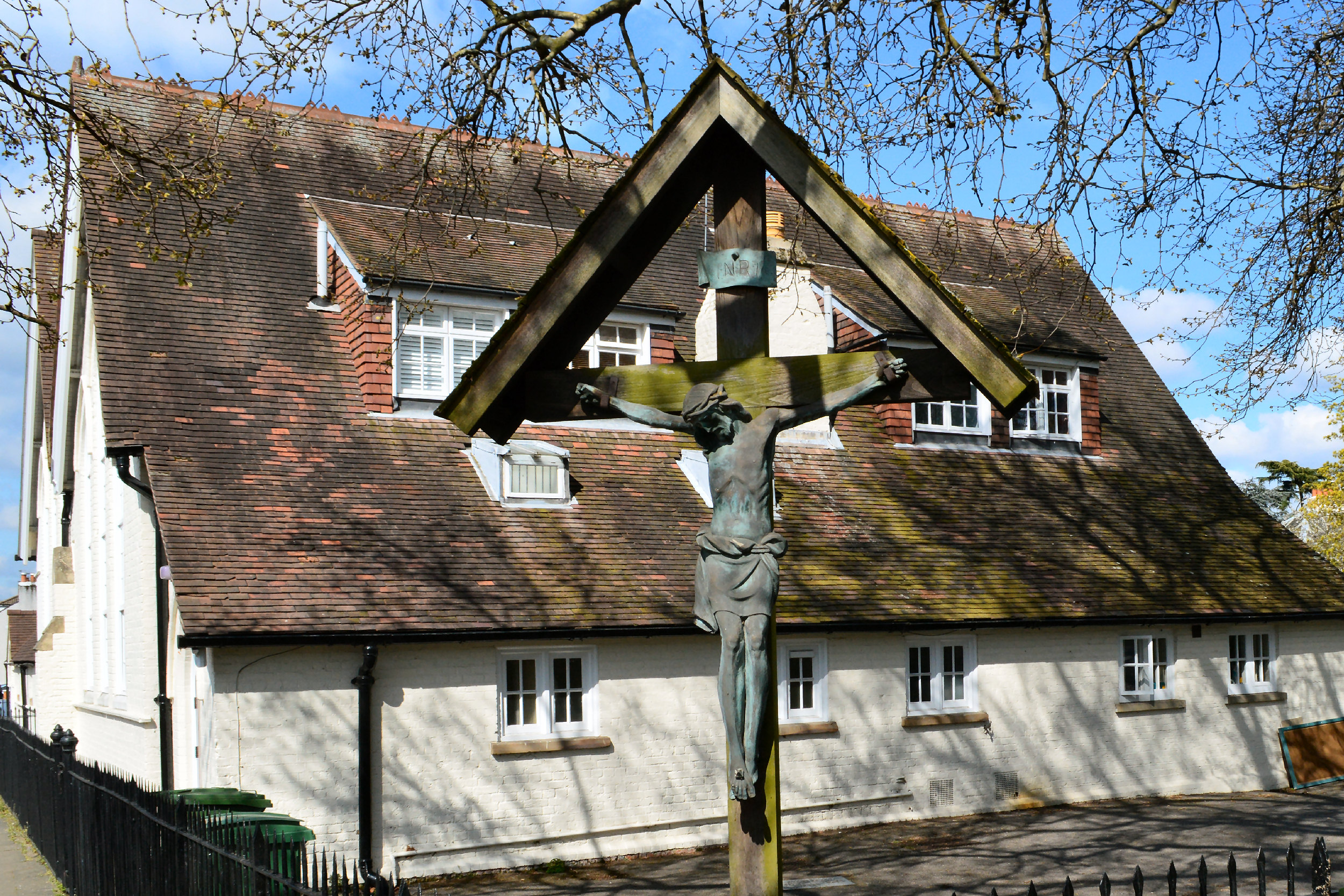
Exterior from Ham Common

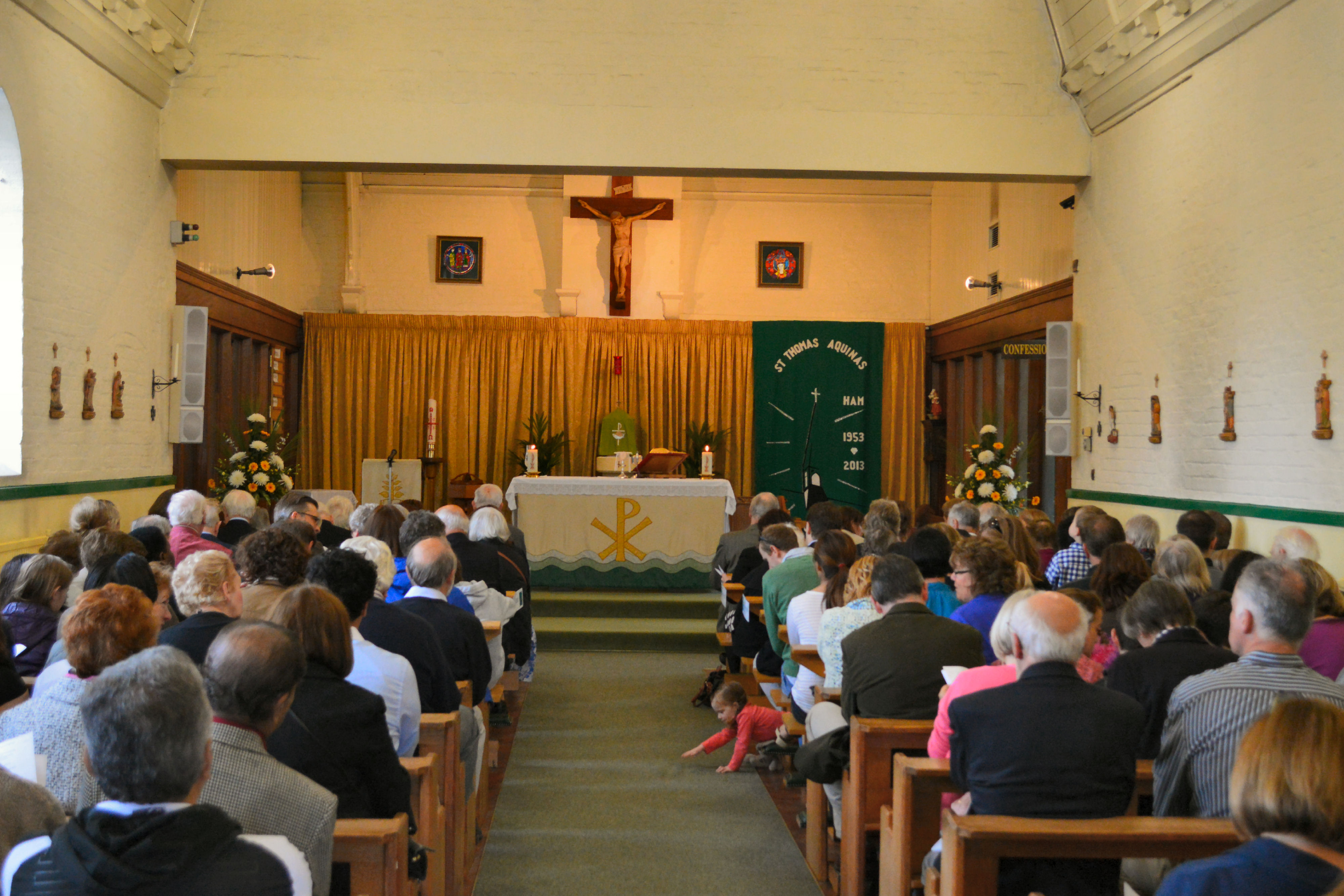
Interior view of the church

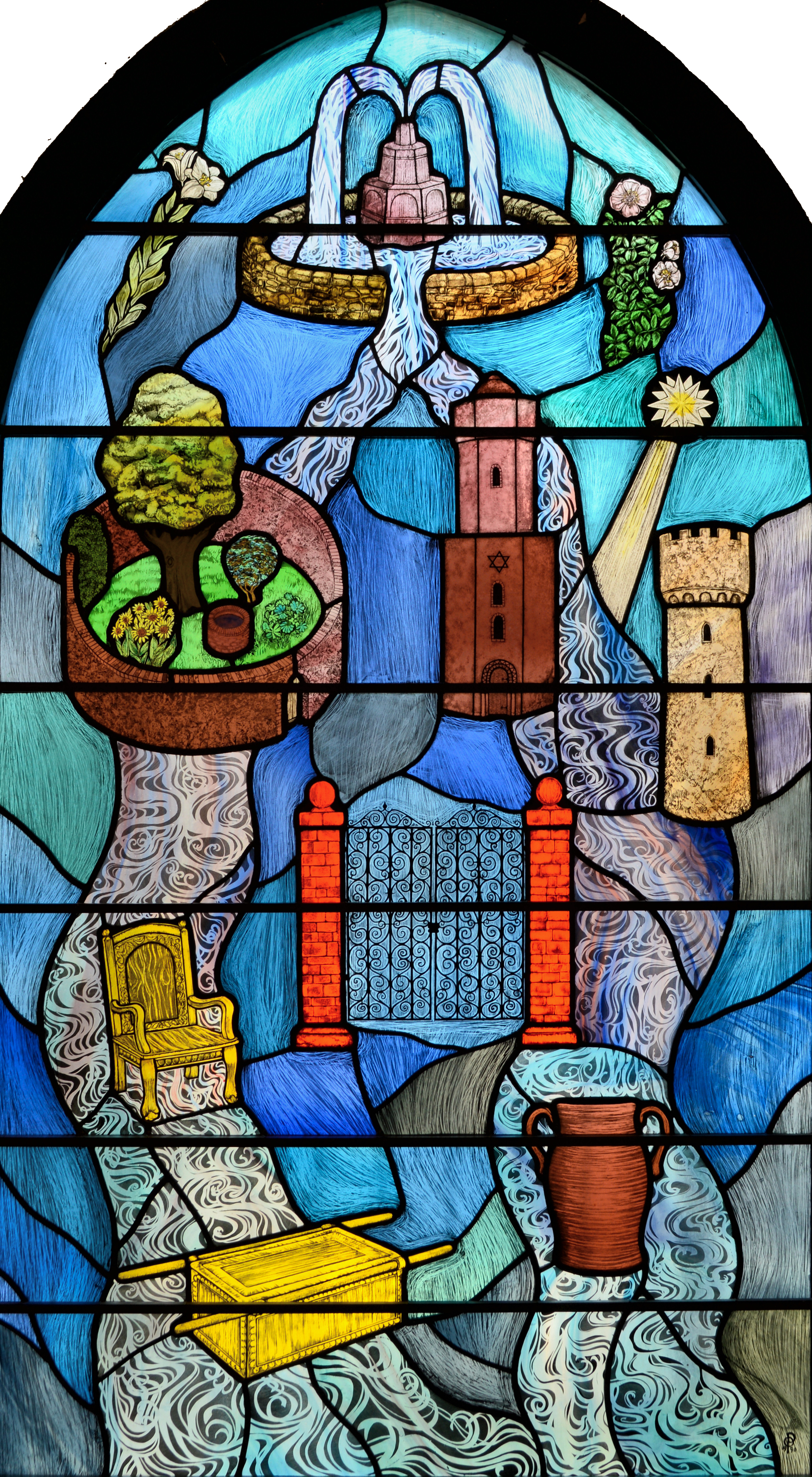
Stained-glass window by Paul Quail
