= St. Thomas Aquinas Church (Palo Alto, California) =

St. Thomas Aquinas Parish
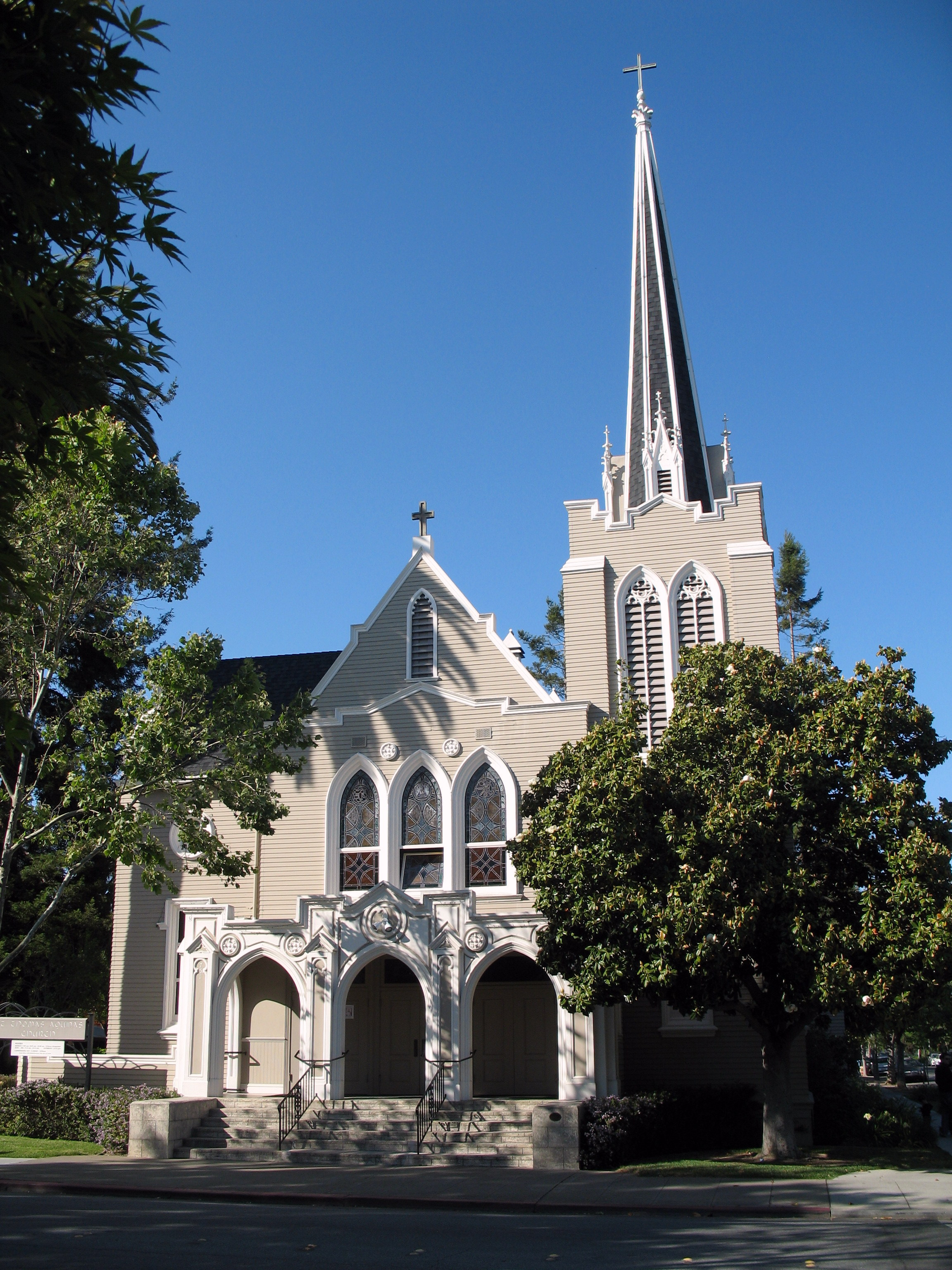

- Location within San Francisco Bay Area
- 37°26′42″N 122°09′27″W
- Location: 751 Waverley Street; Palo Alto, California
- Country: USA
- Denomination: Roman Catholic
- Website: www.paloaltocatholic.net

History
- Status: Parish church
- Founded: 1901
- Dedication: Thomas Aquinas
- Dedicated: November 1903
- Events: Feast Day of St. Thomas Aquinas, Doctor of the Church January 28,

Architecture
- Functional status: Active
- Style: Carpenter Gothic
- Completed: June 1902

Administration
- Province: Ecclesiastical province of San Francisco
- Archdiocese: Roman Catholic Archdiocese of San Francisco
- Diocese: Roman Catholic Diocese of San Jose in California
- Deanery: Deanery 2

Clergy
- Bishop: The Most Rev. Patrick Joseph McGrath
- Vicar: Rev. Fr. Thierry Geris
- Dean: Rev. Fr. Matthew D. Stanley (St. Thomas Aquinas Parish)
- Pastor: Rev. Fr. Matthew D. Stanley

Location in Palo Alto

Started in 1901 and completed in 1902, St. Thomas Aquinas Church is the oldest church in Palo Alto, California and is a registered historic landmark. Its distinctive Carpenter Gothic Victorian style makes it a signature building for the downtown area.

The church is located just three blocks south of University Avenue. At the corner of Waverley and Homer Avenues, it's at the northern edge of the historic Professorville neighborhood of the city. The church was used as a location in the Hal Ashby film Harold and Maude (1971).

St. Thomas Aquinas Parish also includes two other churches, Our Lady of the Rosary Church and St. Albert the Great Church, both also in Palo Alto. The three parishes, as well as St. Aloysius Church in Palo Alto and the Newman Center and St. Ann Chapel at Stanford University were merged into one parish in 1987. St. Aloysius was closed in 1994, the Newman Center at Stanford was reestablished as St. Dominic Parish in 1997, and St. Ann was sold in 1999.

As of the present St. Thomas Aquinas Church is the parish church of St. Thomas Aquinas Parish, which also has two chapels of ease.

== See also ==
- Roman Catholic Diocese of San Jose in California
