= Narellan Anglican Church =

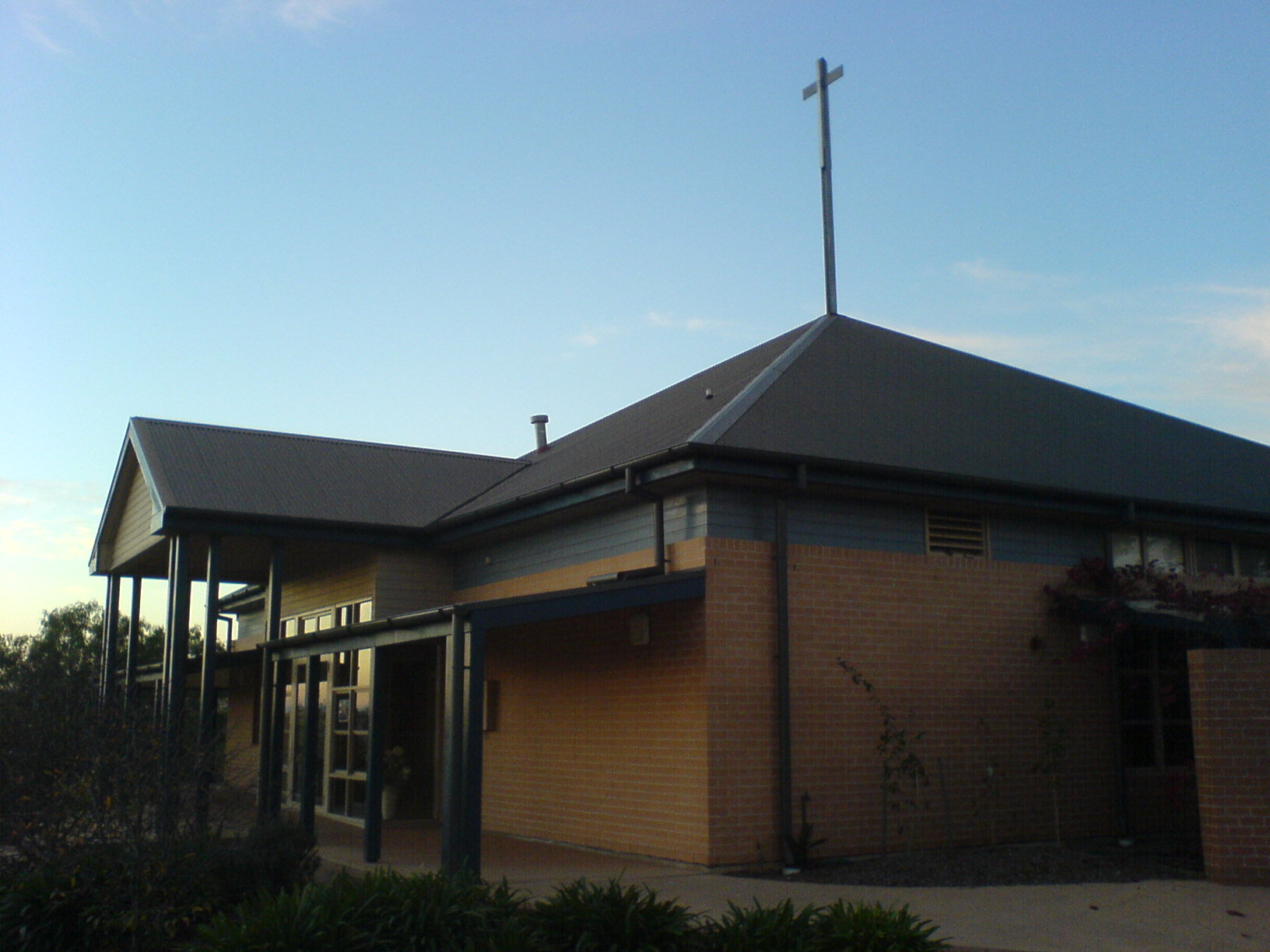
- Narellan Anglican Church
- Narellan Anglican Church
- 34°03′39″S 150°43′55″E
- Location: 172 Richardson Road, Spring Farm, New South Wales
- Country: Australia
- Denomination: Anglicanism
- Website: www.narellananglican.org.au

History
- Founded: 1839

Architecture
- Completed: 2001

Administration
- Diocese: Sydney

The Narellan Anglican Church is an Anglican church in the outer south-western Sydney suburb of Narellan that meets each Sunday at 9:30 am and 5 pm. It is located at 172 Richardson Road in the newly developed suburb of Spring Farm.

== History ==
The lands for the original church building and cemetery were marked out by Surveyor Hoddle in 1827 but little was done until the 1830s probably due to the size of the town and lack of community support. On 10 November 1839 the first church building was officially opened. This building was to serve the Anglican community at Narellan until 1884 and became known as the School Church. Built by the Reverend Thomas Hassall, it was used as a schoolroom on weekdays and a church on Sunday.

The present church building in Spring Farm was completed in 2001, and church continues to gather for three Sunday services, Kids Club, Youth and Playgroup at this new site.

The former parish church, designed by Edmund Blacket, is no longer owned by the Anglican Church. The Revd Dr John Bunyan, a Fellow and Past President of the Anglican Historical Society (Diocese of Sydney, and a Patron of the Campbelltown and Airds Historical Society), notes that it has become The Old St Thomas Chapel and has been beautifully restored by its private owners. It is used for Christian and civil ceremonies, and for many years now, on Good Friday afternoon it has hosted Evensong (from the Book of Common Prayer) at 2 pm. The historic pioneers' graveyard was also sold by the Anglican Church and is now Muslim-owned, though access to Christian family graves is permitted.

== See also ==
- Australian non-residential architectural styles
- List of Anglican churches in the Diocese of Sydney
