= San Tommaso Apostolo, Alcamo =

Catholic church in Alcamo, Italy

San Tommaso Apostolo
- Chiesa di San Tommaso Apostolo
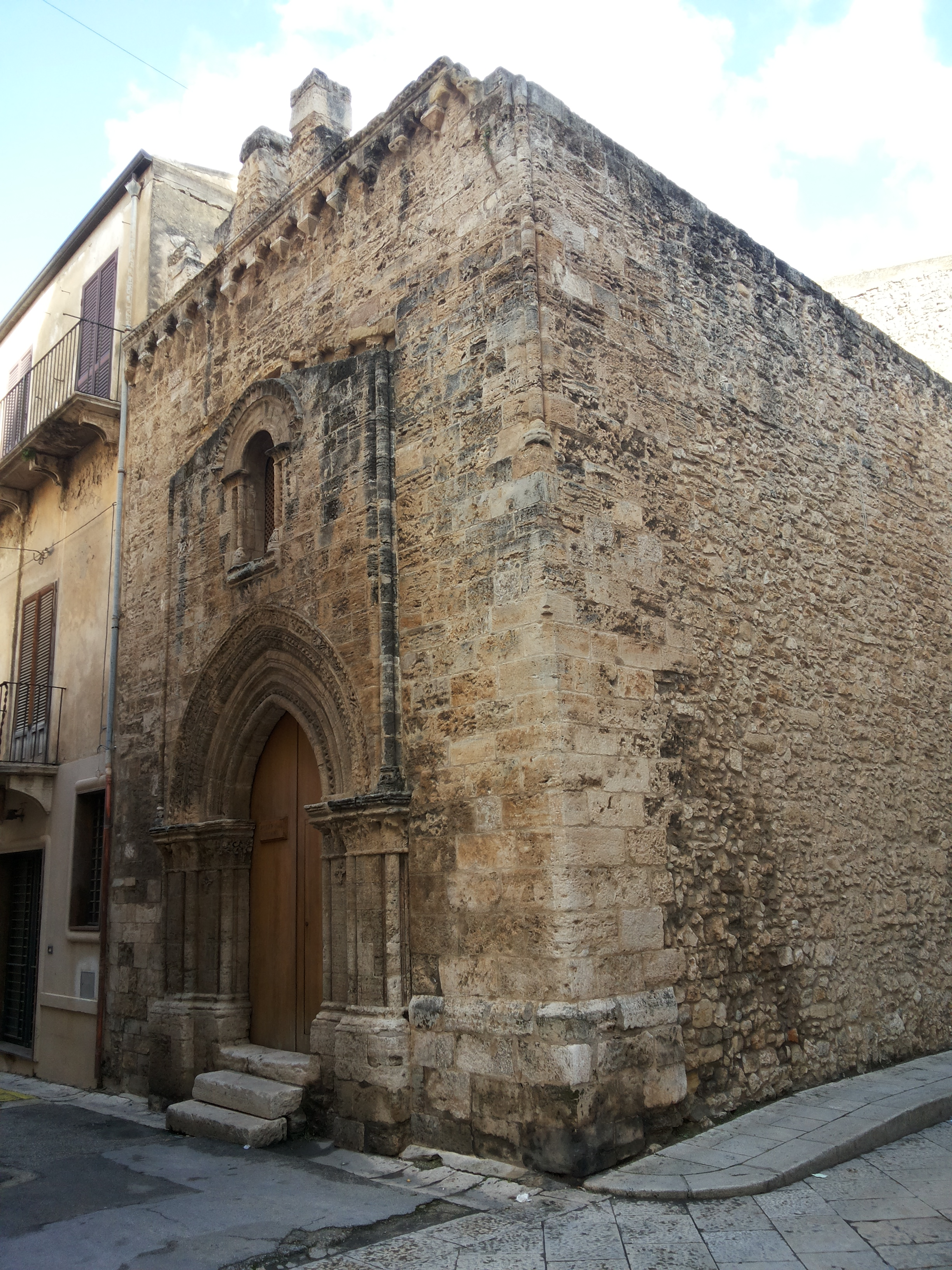
- Side view of the church of Saint Thomas

Religion
- Affiliation: Catholic
- Province: Trapani
- Region: Sicily

Location
- Location: Alcamo, Trapani, Italy
- State: Italy
- Interactive map of San Tommaso Apostolo
- Territory: Alcamo
- Coordinates: 37.981122°N 12.967815°E

Architecture
- Completed: about 1450

Specifications
- Length: 10.50 m
- Width: 5.30 m

San Tommaso Apostolo ("Saint Thomas the Apostle") is a former Catholic church located in Alcamo, in province of Trapani, Sicily, southern Italy.

== History ==
The church, dedicated to Saint Thomas the Apostle, was probably built by the Marcanzas' ancestors at about 1450. It is the only church which has remained integral among those built before the 16th century in Alcamo.

In 1599 the company of the Holy Ghost was founded in this church.

The roof, which had been damaged by rain, was reconstructed by the government and the town council in 1928.

Since 1984 it has been the seat of Alcamo Rotary Club.

== Description and works ==
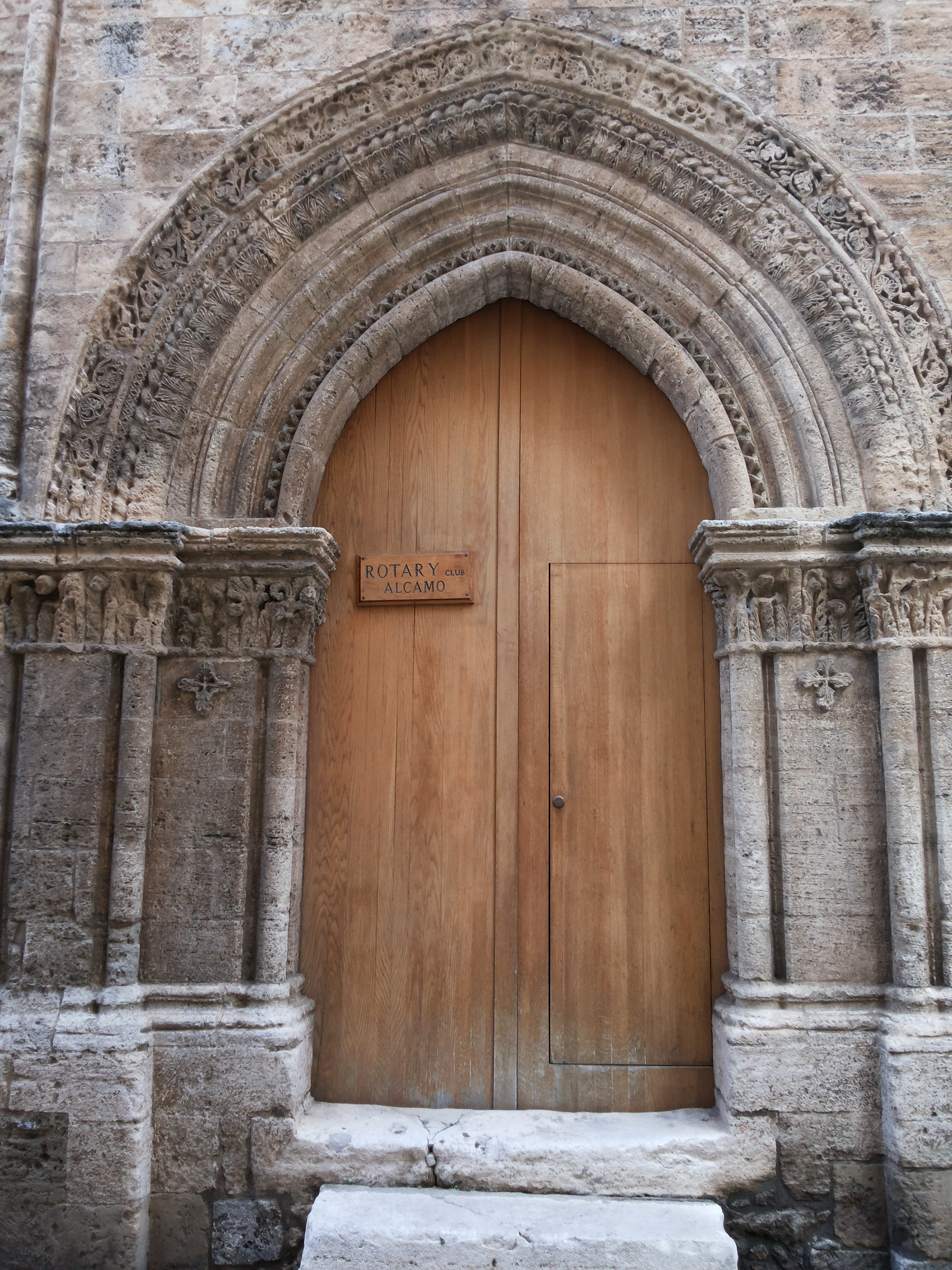
The church's facade.

The church has little sizes (10,50×5,30 metres). The interior has got a single nave and is divided by a pointed arch leaning on two wall columns; the ceiling is covered by two pointed cross vaults, with prominent shaped ribs and keystones, which are interrupted by capitals as high as the vault and continuing to the floor, where there is a common base with one of the columns bearing the arch. One of the capitals is decorated with acanthus leaves, the other one with wickerwork.

The pointed external portal (known also as "Saint Thomas' portal") is richly engraved and combines the Hohenstaufen-style module of the arch with the Chiaramontan intaglios ); it is dominated by a single lancet window, magnificently carved and enriched by two small columns embedded into the wall.

Today the white marble baptistery, realized in the 15th century, is inside the Sacred Art Museum of Basilica of Our Lady of the Assumption.

== Sources ==
- Culmone, Luigi; Mistretta, Pier Francesco (2011). La Chiesa di San Tommaso Apostolo: una luce dal Medioevo (in Italian). Alcamo: Rotary International.
- Regina, Vincenzo (1972). Profilo storico di Alcamo e sue opere d'arte dalle origini al secolo XV (in Italian). Alcamo: Edizioni Accademia di Studi "Cielo d'Alcamo".
- Cataldo, Carlo (2001). La conchiglia di S. Giacomo (in Italian) (Edizioni Campo ed.). Alcamo.
