= Church of St. Thomas the Apostle (Beloit, Wisconsin) =

Historic church in Wisconsin, United States

- U.S. National Register of Historic Places
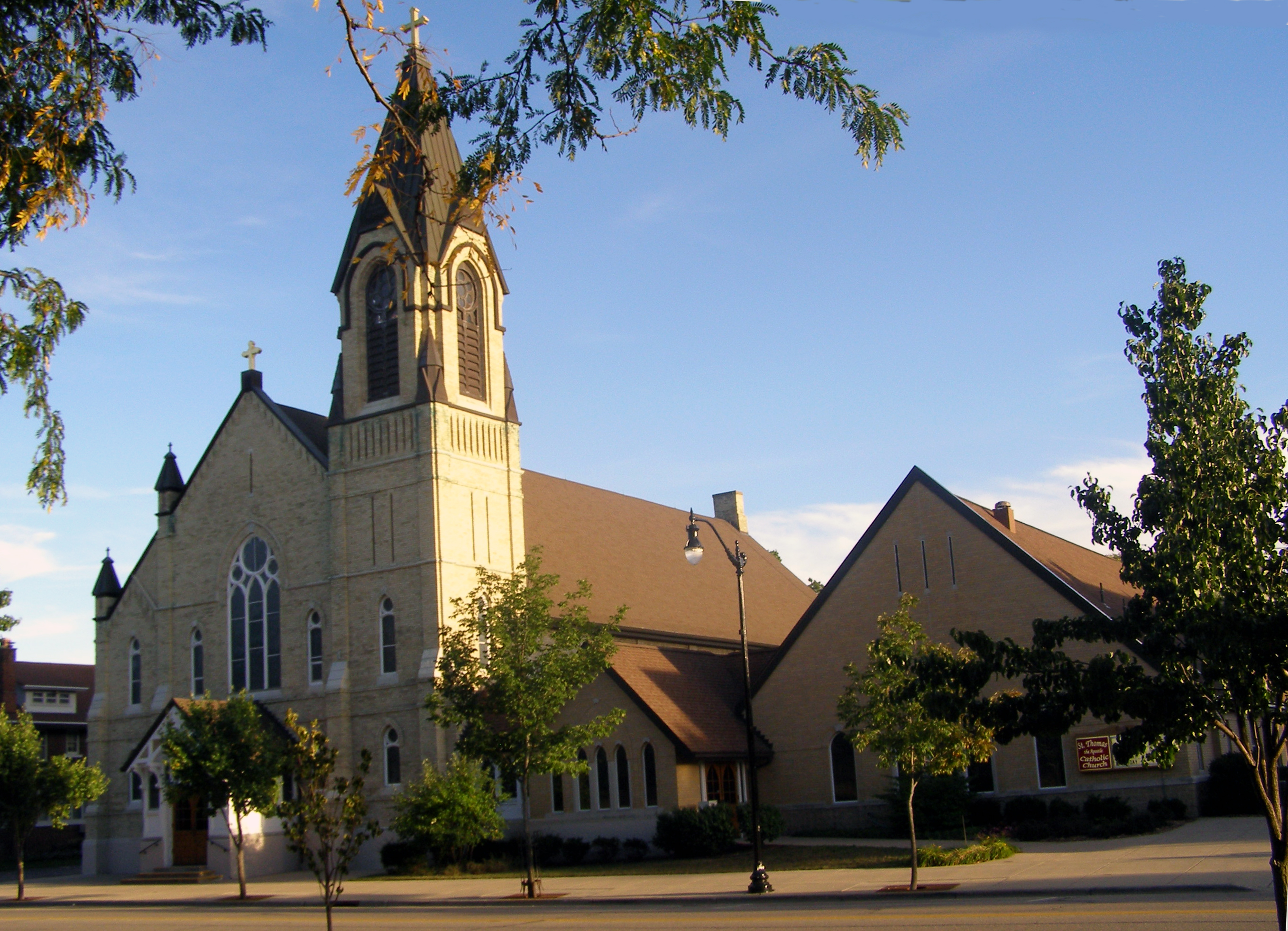

- Location within Wisconsin Location within the United States
- Location: 822 E. Grand Ave., Beloit, Wisconsin
- Coordinates: 42°29′58″N 89°1′41″W
- Area: 0.4 acres (0.16 ha)
- Built: 1885
- Architect: James J. Egan
- Architectural style: Gothic, Stick/eastlake
- MPS: Beloit MRA
- NRHP reference No.: 83003413
- Added to NRHP: January 7, 1983

Church of St. Thomas the Apostle is a historic church at 822 E. Grand Avenue in Beloit, Wisconsin, United States. It was built in 1885 and was added to the National Register of Historic Places in 1983.

St. Thomas is the oldest Catholic parish in Beloit, with roots going back to 1846, when the parishioners were largely Irish immigrants worshiping in the home of Captain Thomas and Lucy Power, where City Hall now stands. In 1854 the parish built a stone church, in which they worshiped for thirty years until it burned in 1884. Reverend J.W. Ward set right to work raising funds for a new building, partly by giving a series of temperance lectures.

The new church was built from 1885 to 1886 on the site of the stone church. James J. Egan of Chicago designed a simply massed rectangular building with a gable roof and a square corner tower, with fine details. The walls are cream brick, with brick buttresses and stone trim. The porches are in Stick style, an unusual choice for a church like this. The windows are tall, with arches slightly pointed, a typical Gothic detail. A circle-within-the-arch motif repeats in many windows. Many buttresses lead up to little towers with gablets on top. The big corner tower has its own corner gablets, then a belfry with a rose window, then a spire reaching 150 feet, topped with a cross.

Inside, the auditorium is 118 feet long and fifty-five feet wide, with an arcade of stained glass windows. Behind the altar is another large, elaborate stained glass window. The ceiling is supported by wooden trusses. The church was built by masons Marshall and Sweet, carpenters Cummingham Brothers, and stonecutter A.S. Jackson, all from Beloit.
