= St. Thomas Anglican Church (Shanty Bay, Ontario) =

Historic Church in Ontario, Canada

- Interactive map of the St. Thomas Anglican Church area

General information
- Architectural style: Gothic Revival
- Location: Shanty Bay, Ontario, Canada
- Coordinates: 44.41079°N 79.58174°W
- Construction started: 1838
- Completed: 1841

Technical details
- Structural system: Rammed earth, stuccoed over

St. Thomas Anglican Church is an historic Gothic Revival style Anglican church building located at 28 Church Street, in Shanty Bay in the township of Oro-Medonte in Simcoe County, Ontario, Canada.

== History ==
It was built of rammed earth or pisé de terre or simply pisé between 1838 and 1841 by local craftsmen. The axe marks on the hand hewn wooden forms used for the rammed earth are still visible. Its steep pitched roof, lancet windows and entrance tower are typical of Gothic Revival churches. It was consecrated on February 27, 1842, and is still an active Anglican church.

The church construction was begun by Lieutenant-Colonel W.E. O'Brien, who also was the progenitor of Shanty Bay, the village the church is in. Lieutenant-Colonel O'Brien raised the 35'th Simcoe Foresters, who will later become the Grey and Simcoe Foresters. their guidon is displayed to the left of the main door, in the main area of the church.

== Current ==
The Rev. Sandor Borbely is the current rector. The church's burying ground is located on its right side.

== Notable rectors ==
The Rev. Canon Stephen Peake was rector of St. Thomas from 1998–2005. Peake recently placed 3rd in the Anglican Bishop Election by the diocese of Toronto.

== Status as a heritage site ==
The church is a provincial heritage site. To the left front of the church building there is a plaque erected by the Archaeological and Historic Sites Board of the Department of Public Records and Archives of Ontario. The plaque reads: "This church is one of the few surviving structures in Ontario built of "rammed earth". This method of construction utilized wet clay mixed with chopped straw, compacted into forms and covered, when dry, with plaster or siding for protection against weather. Built in a plain, somewhat Romanesque style, the church was begun in 1838 and largely completed by 1841, although not officially opened until February 27, 1842. Lt.-Colonel Edward O'Brien, leading member of the Shanty Bay settlement, donated the church site and clergyman's residence, and directed the construction of the church. He and his wife, Mary Sophia, are buried in the adjacent cemetery. The Rev. S.B. Ardagh served as rector from 1842 to 1867."

== See also ==
- Church of the Holy Cross (Stateburg, South Carolina), an Episcopal church built of rammed earth in 1850–1852. It is a U.S. National Historic Landmark.
