= Francis Baird =

British engineer (1802–1864)

Francis Baird (1802–1864) was an engineer of Scottish ancestry in Saint Petersburg, who took over his father's business manufacturing machinery, ships, and metalwork for some of the city's major structures.

== Life ==
He was born on 28 February 1802, one of Charles Baird's three sons, and the only one to live beyond his thirties. He joined his father's company in St. Petersburg at the age of 17 and also went to the University of Edinburgh.

In 1823 he was elected to the Institution of Civil Engineers, one of its earliest members.

He married Dorothea Halliday in 1828 and they had ten children.

Some of the time he worked with his cousin William Handyside, who had a leading role in several engineering projects, and it is not entirely clear how much he helped Handyside with the specialist castings for the Alexander Column and Saint Isaac's Cathedral. He is credited with casting the great cannons in the Kremlin and the angel on the Alexander monument. As well as the iron foundry, he also managed a sugar refinery, sawmills and 10 steam vessels providing a ferry service between St. Petersburg and Cronstadt. https://archive.org/details/russiaandrussia00kohlgoog The cathedral work continued under Francis Baird's supervision when Handyside left Russia after Charles Baird died in 1843. At this time, Francis took over the Baird Works and the rest of his father's business. The decorative railings on the Nicholas Bridge (opened 1850) were produced by Baird's while he was in charge.

In 1860 the Baird Works were flourishing with between 1200 and 1500 employees, and were producing half a million roubles worth of goods per year. Francis Baird died on 25 March 1864, having received many Imperial honours. A memoir of his life and his father's was published after his death.

== Reading ==
- A. Kempton, Robert William Rennison, T. Cox, Biographical Dictionary of Civil Engineers in Great Britain and Ireland, Vol 1 (London 2002)
- James Nasmyth, Autobiography (1885)
- Memoir of the late Charles Baird, esq., of St Petersburg, and of his son, the late Francis Baird, esq., of St. Petersburg and 4, Queens Gate, London (London, 1867)
- Russian Iron Bridges to 1850 (Newcomen Society 1982)
