= Adamini =

Adamini is a surname. Notable people with the surname include:

- Antonio Adamini (1792–1846), Swiss-born Russian architect and engineer
- Stephen Adamini (1945–2026), American politician
