= Charles Baird (engineer) =

Scottish engineer (1766–1843)

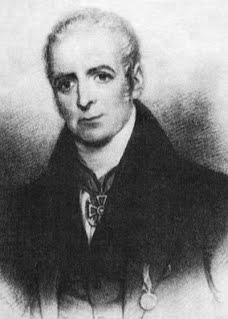
- Born: 20 December 1766
- Died: 10 December 1843 (aged 76)
- Occupation: Engineer

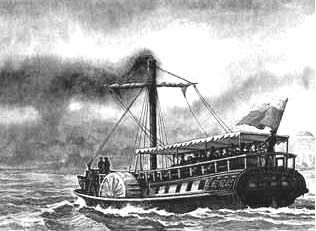
Elizaveta, the first Russian steamship

Charles Baird (20 December 1766 – 10 December 1843) was a Scottish engineer who played an important part in the industrial and business life of 19th-century St. Petersburg. His company specialised in steam-driven machinery and was responsible for Russia's first steamboat.

== Biography ==
Born at Westerton, Bothkennar, Stirlingshire, a farm owned by the Gascoigne family, Charles was one of the nine children of Nicol Baird, who later became a toll collector and then superintendent of works for the Forth and Clyde Canal. He was originally baptised Gascoigne Baird in January 1767. His younger brother Hugh Baird also became an engineer. Charles Baird started his working life in 1782 as an apprentice at the Carron Ironworks near Falkirk.

By the age of 19 Baird had a supervisory post in the gun department, and in 1786 he accompanied a Carron Company manager, Charles Gascoigne, a son of the owner's family, to Russia to establish the Aleksandrovsk gun factory at Petrozavodsk, and a cannonball foundry at Kronstadt. Gascoigne had been invited to Russia by Samuel Greig, a Scot who was an admiral in the Russian Navy.

Gascoigne Baird came to be known as Charles Baird, perhaps to avoid confusion with Charles Gascoigne, and had his change of name to Charles Baird officially sanctioned by the church authorities in Scotland in February 1792. In 1792, Baird entered into partnership with Francis Morgan, whose daughter Sophia he had married in June 1794. Their St. Petersburg business became known as the Baird Works (Russian: Завод Берда) and specialised in steam-driven machinery. It supplied machinery for the Imperial Arsenal, Mint, and glassworks, and undertook a range of projects from bridge-building to ornamental metalwork. Baird also had a sugar refinery using his own innovative method of refining.

The Baird Works were responsible for the Elizaveta, Russia's first steamship, launched in 1815, and this early start gave them a ten-year monopoly on steamship routes from St. Petersburg, including the Elizaveta's run to Kronstadt. They had their own wharves, and The St. Petersburg Times has said Baird helped "create a great industrial kingdom on the Neva River that is known today as Admiralty Shipyard (Admiralteiskiye Verfi), the shipbuilding company." Baird's supplied the ironwork for several bridges, including the first cast iron arch bridge in Russia (1805) and from the 1820s, suspension bridges designed by Wilhelm von Traitteur, like the Postoffice Bridge over the river Moika. The company also worked with the architect Auguste de Montferrand on the Alexander Column and Saint Isaac's Cathedral, and were responsible for technical aspects of the cathedral dome design.

The business was operated by Russian serfs, some of them extremely skilled in fine ornamental metalwork, according to James Nasmyth's account. Baird brought other engineers from Scotland to work with him: his son Francis and nephew William Handyside made important contributions, with Francis carrying the Baird Works forward after his father's death. Handyside took the lead in the firm's work with Montferrand, and another nephew, Nicol Hugh Baird who spent a few years in St. Petersburg, later became a noted Canadian engineer. Other Handyside brothers came to work in Russia, including Andrew Handyside. Charles' younger brother Hugh Baird was designer of the Edinburgh & Glasgow Union Canal.

Charles Baird was known for his business skills as well as his technical ability, and his achievements were recognised both in Britain and in Russia. In 1841 he was elected to the Institution of Civil Engineers, and the many honours he received led to the title of Knight of St Vladimir. He died on 10 December 1843 and is buried in the Smolenskoye Lutheran Cemetery, St. Petersburg.

== See also ==
- Carronade
