= Antonio Adamini =

Russian architect and engineer

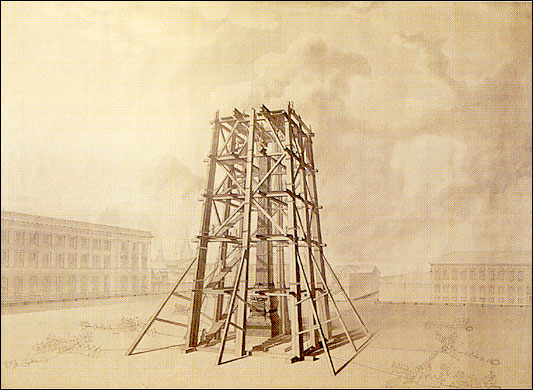
Construction

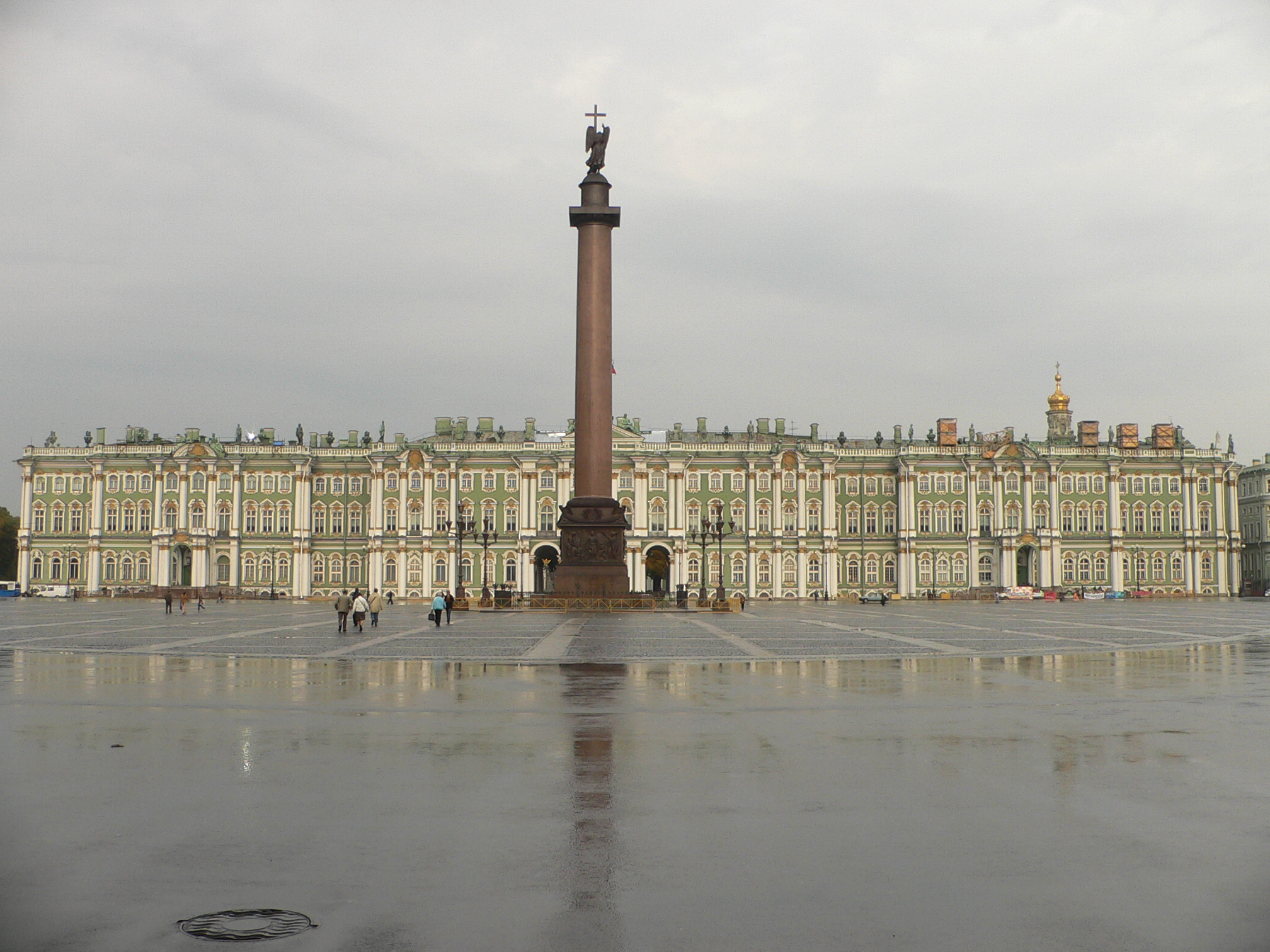
Winter Palace obelisk

Antonio Adamini (25 December 1792 in Bigogno, Ticino⁣ – 16 June 1846, St. Petersburg) was a Swiss-born Russian architect and engineer.

Of his training little is known, but he was appointed in the late spring of 1816 (some say 1818) with his cousin Domenico Adamini to the court of the Russian Tsar. After furthered his career in the administration, and he was the architect of the State Bank in the 1830s. Adamini's significant structural performance was to construct the 25-meter-high monument to Tsar Alexander, a monolithic granite pillar, the Alexander Column in 1832 and 1834, before the Winter Palace with Auguste de Montferrand. The logistical preparation for this project took four years.

Adamini also designed a monument to the Battle of Borodino on the road to Smolensk. In 1835, Nicholas I of Russia ordered to install 16 standard cast-iron monuments in the places of the most important battles of the Patriotic War of 1812. The monuments were divided into three classes: the first class monument was to be installed in Borodino, the second class monuments in Tarutino, Maloyaroslavets, Krasnoye, Studenka (at the Berezina), Klyastitsy (near Vitebsk), Smolensk, Polotsk, Chashniki, Kulakovo and Kovno, the third class monuments - in Saltykovka (east and outside Moscow), Vitebsk, Kobrin, Vyazma. The place of installation of the 16th monument is absent in the documents. However, this plan was not fully realized. The first monuments were installed in Borodino, Smolensk and Kovno, then there were monuments in Maloyaroslavets and Krasny. But at the beginning of 1848 it became clear that the rest of the monuments lacked funds, and the program of installation of monuments had to be curtailed. Only two more monuments of the second class, already cast by that time, were installed - in Polotsk and Klyastitsy. Thus, seven of the planned sixteen monuments were installed.

The monument in Kovno disappeared already in 1915. It was melted down by the Germans occupying the city. The rest of the monuments were destroyed by the communist authorities in 1931 - 1932. The monuments in Borodino, Maloyaroslavets, Krasny and Polotsk were blown up and melted down, and in 1939, the monument in Klyastitsy. By some miracle only one monument survived - in Smolensk.

== Literature ==
- Isabelle Rucki und Dorothee Huber (Hg): Architektenlexikon der Schweiz — 19./20. Jahrhundert Basel: Birkhäuser 1998. ISBN 3-7643-5261-2
