= Nicol Hugh Baird =

Scottish surveyor (1756–1849)

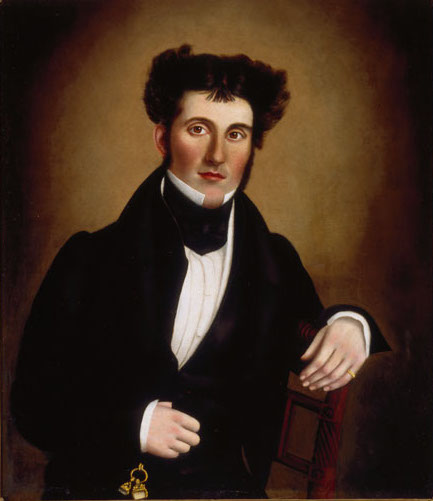
- Portrait by Nelson Cook, 1833
- Born: 26 August 1796; Glasgow, Scotland
- Died: 18 October 1849 (aged 53); Brattleboro, Vermont, US
- Occupation: Surveyor

Nicol Hugh Baird (26 August 1796 – 18 October 1849) was a Scottish surveyor who worked for his uncle Charles Baird in St Petersburg for several years, and emigrated to Canada in 1828.

== Career ==
Baird was born in Glasgow on 26 August 1796. He was a son of Hugh Baird and Margaret Burnthwaite. Little is known about his early life; around the age of 16, he went to Russia, where he spent several years with his uncle. He returned to Scotland around 1816 and continued training. In 1828, he left for Canada.

Baird is known in Canada for the work on various canal and road construction in Upper and Lower Canada as well as inventing equipment for making existing locks more accessible for steamships. His skills as a surveyor and engineer are reflected as an integral part of projects such as the Rideau, Trent, and Welland canals. His thorough written accounts give historians a record of early Canadian engineering.

He died in Brattleboro, Vermont, on 18 October 1849.
