= Boris Orlovsky =

Russian sculptor

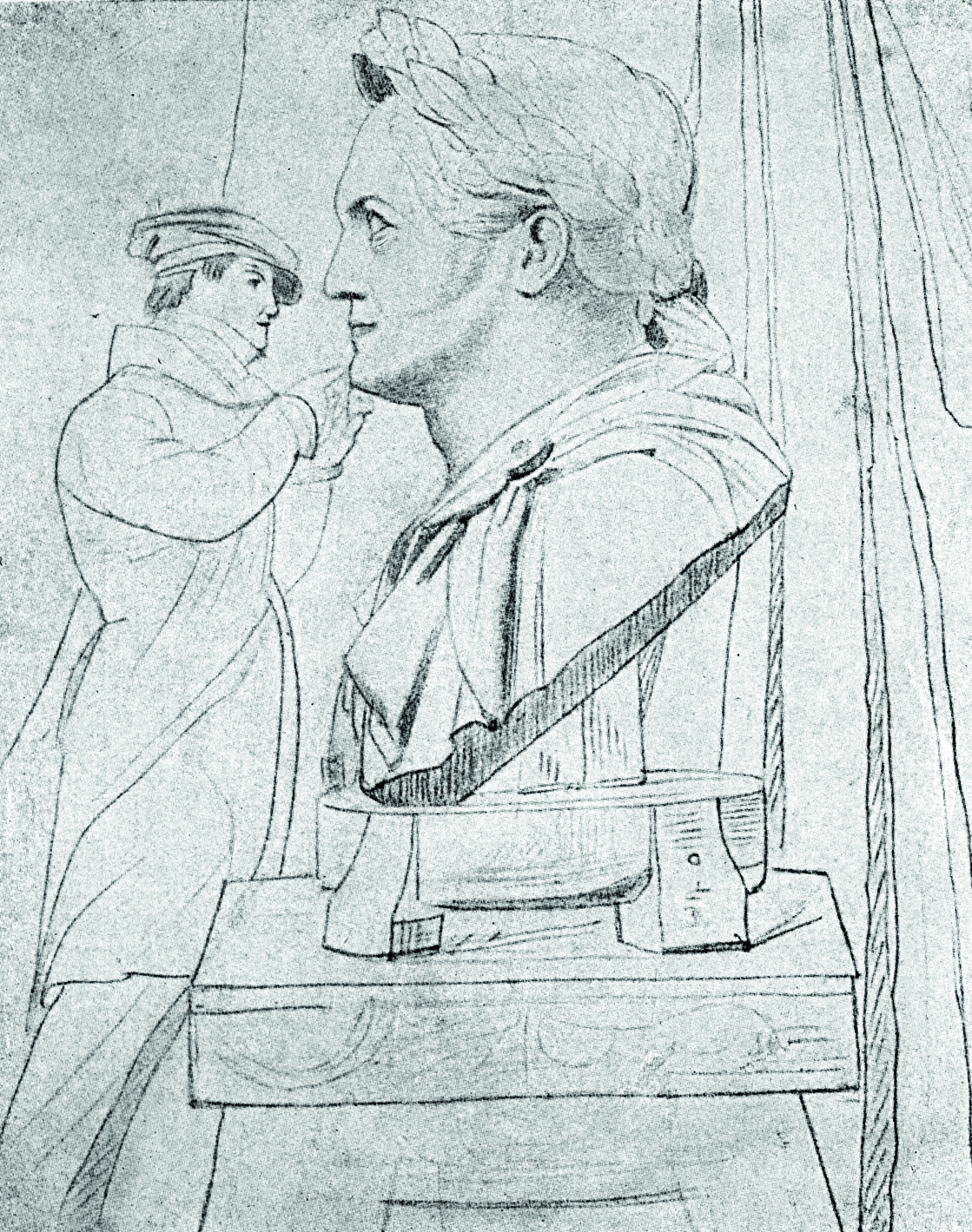
Mikhail Markov, Boris Orlovsky in Thorvaldsen's Studio, c. 1827, pencil on paper; Russian Museum, St. Petersburg

Boris Ivanovich Orlovsky (Russian: Бори́с Ива́нович Орло́вский; 1790s – 28 December 1837) was a Russian Neoclassical sculptor.

== Biography ==
Born into a serf peasant family in Tula, Russia, his artistic talent led to him being freed by his master and sent to the Imperial Academy of Arts in Saint Petersburg. After studying for six years in Italy under Bertel Thorvaldsen, he returned to teach at the Academy where he later became a Professor. At the same time, he improved his skill in the studios of Santino Campioni and Agostino Triscorni. Boris Orlovsky died in 1837 in Saint Petersburg.

Orlovsky's statues of Kutuzov and Barclay de Tolly in front of the Kazan Cathedral reveal a realistic undercurrent in his otherwise Neoclassical work, typified by the Angel on top of the Alexander Column at the Palace Square.

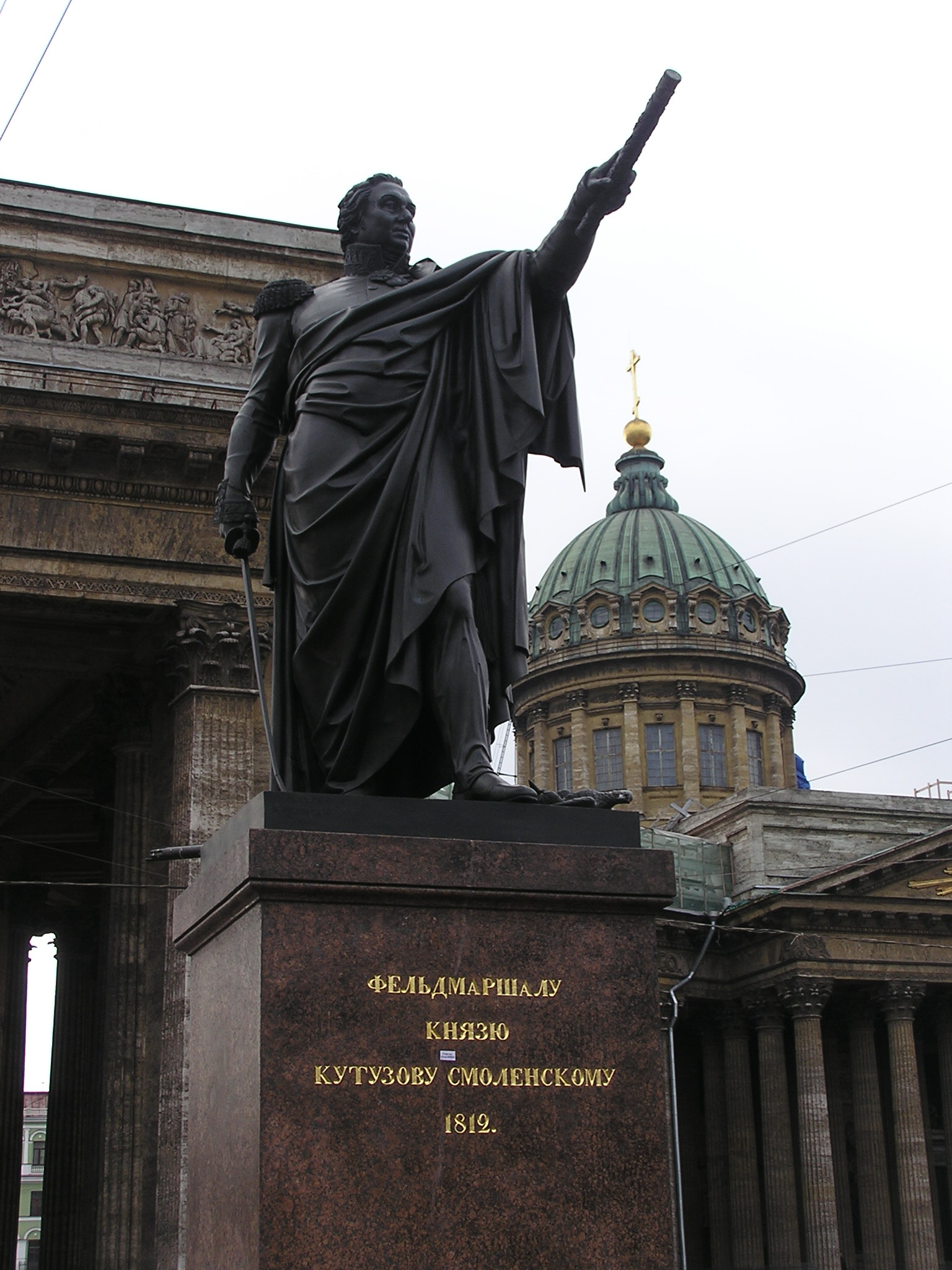
Orlovsky's statue of Mikhail Kutuzov in front of the Kazan Cathedral

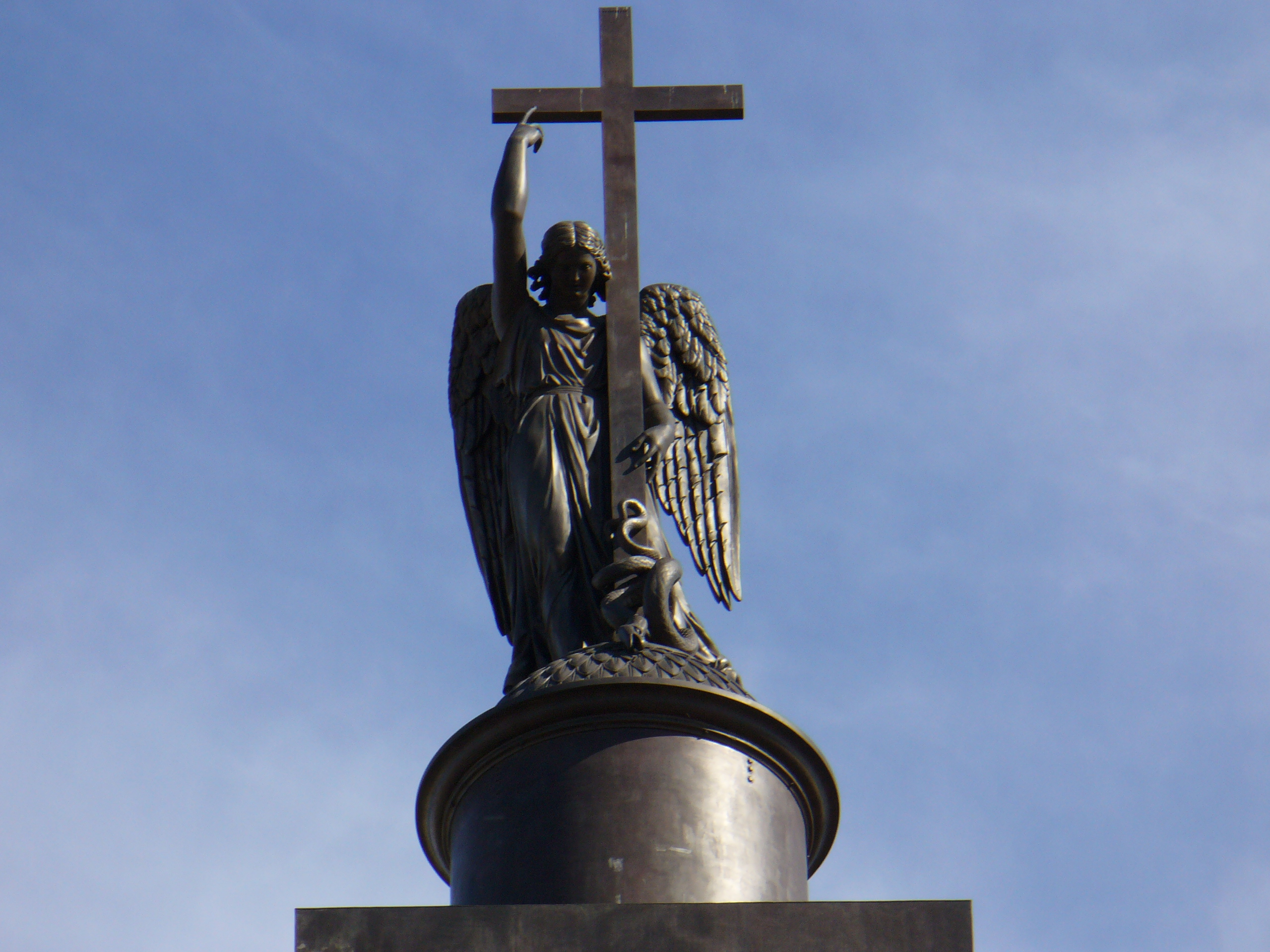
The angel on the Alexander Column

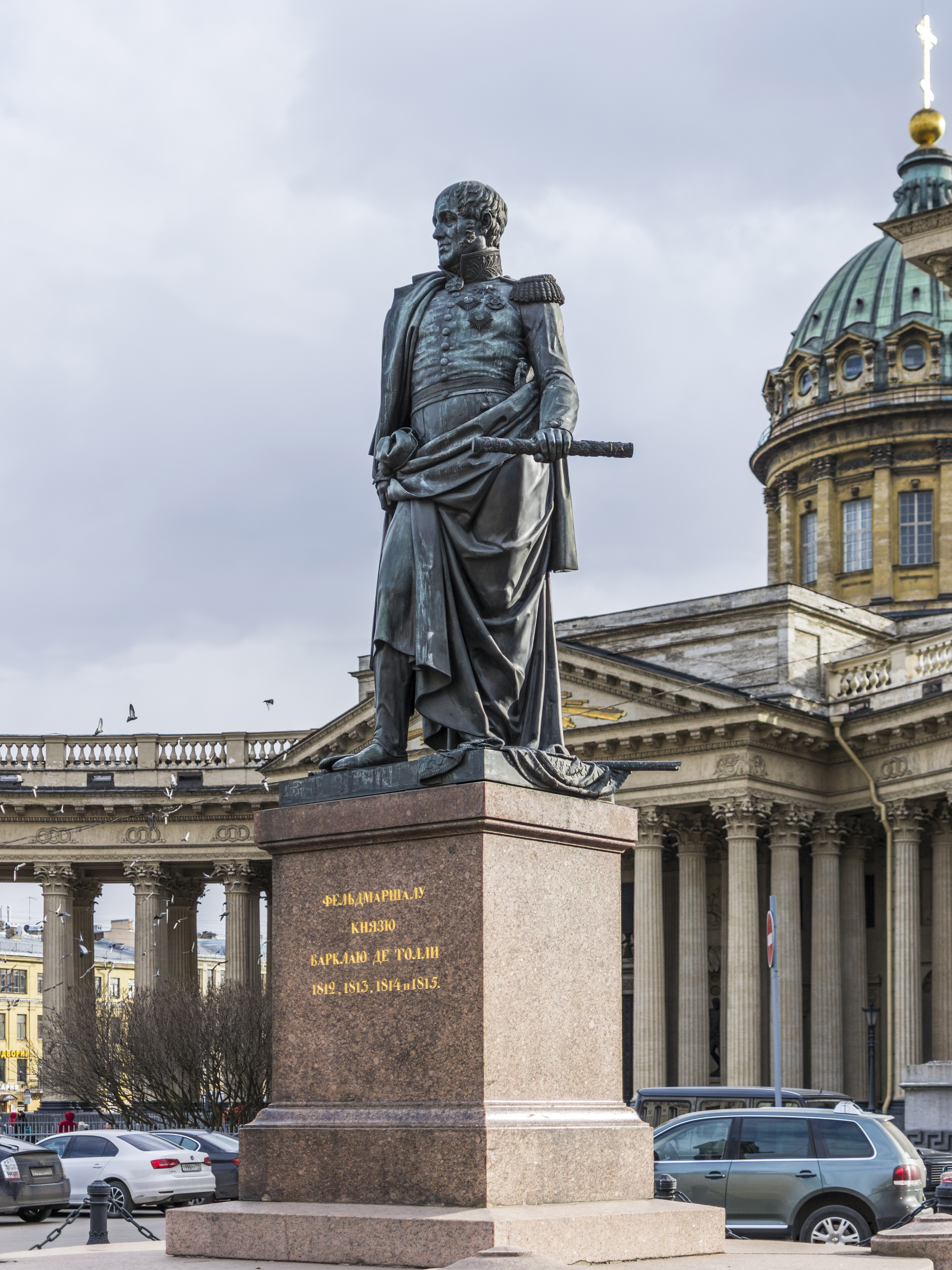
Orlovsky's statue of Michael Barclay de Tolly in front of the Kazan Cathedral
