= William Handyside =

Scottish engineer (1793–1850)

William Handyside (1793–1850) was a Scottish engineer who was involved in several important construction projects in St. Petersburg.

== Biography ==
Born in Edinburgh on 25 July 1793, to merchant Hugh Handyside and his wife Margaret, he was the eldest brother of Andrew Handyside and nephew of Charles Baird. On a visit to Scotland in 1810, Baird invited William, then a trainee architect, to join his flourishing business in St. Petersburg and live in his household.

His first projects included installing machinery at the imperial arsenal and glassworks and helping build the Elizaveta steamship, launched in 1815. He was a talented engineer and contributed to the development of Baird Works' steamship and steam engine manufacturing. He developed a gas lighting system for the factory and the sugar refining process conceived by Baird. When the company started working with Wilhelm von Traitteur and Pierre Bazaine on the first Russian suspension bridges in the 1820s, Handyside designed a machine to test the chains which is described in Traitteur's writings.

Most famously, Handyside worked with Auguste de Montferrand on the Alexander Column and St. Isaac's Cathedral. His experience was the basis for a paper presented to the Institution of Civil Engineers describing "methods of hauling large monoliths". In 1835, a "communication" was read to the Philosophical Society of Edinburgh describing " ...the cutting and erection of the great Pillar at St Peterburgh in memory of Alexander the I, Emperor of Russia, by Wm. Handyside, Esq. Engineer, St Petersburgh, who was engaged on that occasion, and more particularly in the casting of the Bronze work." (original spelling)

Handyside had a leading role in designing the large iron structure of the cathedral of St. Isaac dome, gilding it and casting the bronze ornamentation, though Francis Baird oversaw the later stages of this process. He worked on the ground level colonnade of pillars and the columns supporting the dome and devised special machinery to help with construction.

After Baird's death in 1843, William and Andrew Handyside both returned to the UK though other Handyside brothers remained in Russia. William retired, while taking some part in the proceedings of the Institution of Civil Engineers which he had belonged to since 1822.

He died on 26 May 1850 at his mother's Edinburgh home, where she had died the preceding month.

== Family ==
Later, in 1829, Handyside married Sophia Gordon Busch and had four children.

== See also ==
- Moika River
