= Alexander Column =

1830s granite column in St. Petersburg

Coordinates: 59°56′21″N 30°18′57″E

- Алекса́ндровская коло́нна
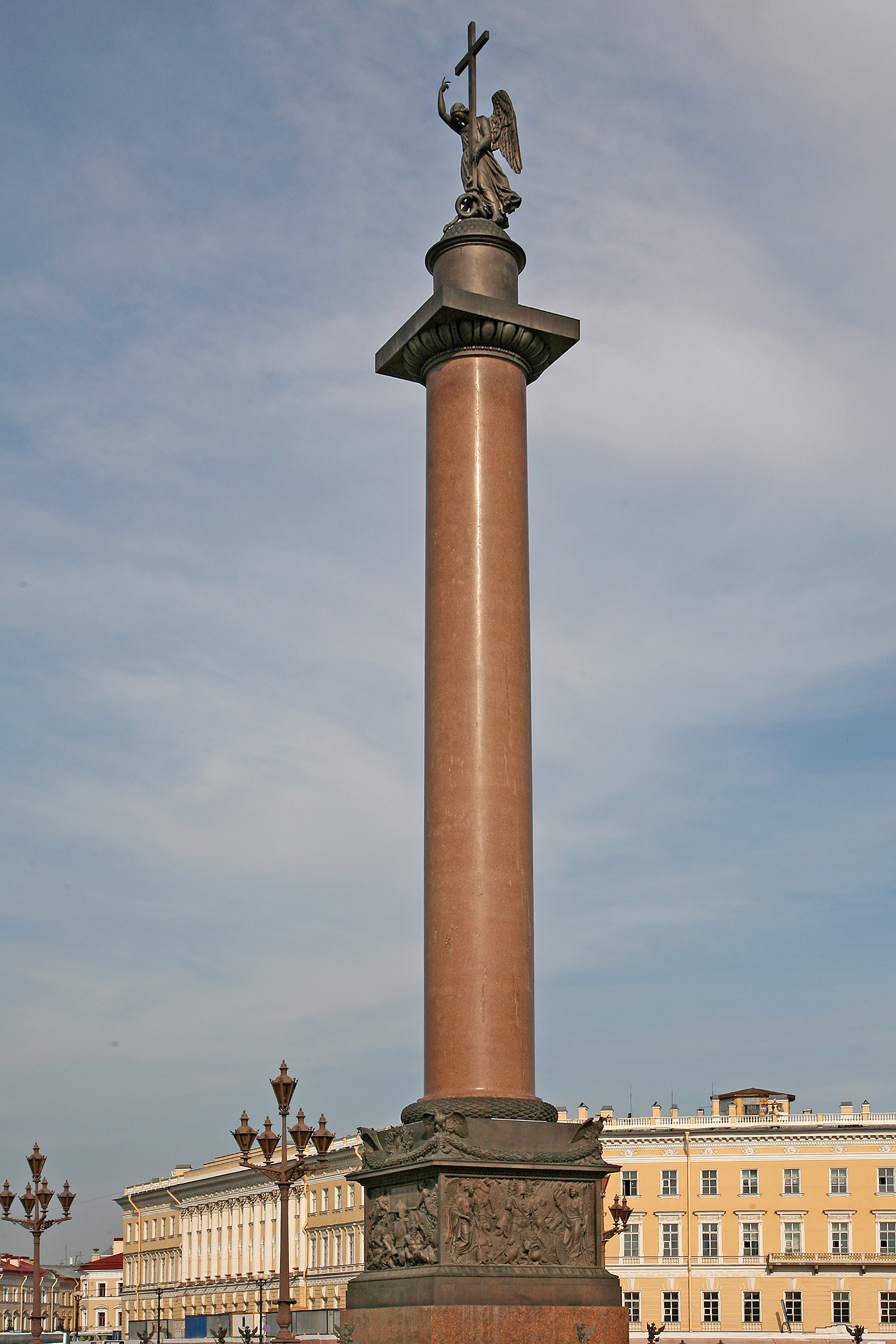
- Height: Total: 47.5 metres (156 ft); Column: 25.45 metres (83.5 ft)
- Width: 3.5 metres (11 ft)
- Weight: 600 tonnes (1,300,000 lb)

The Alexander Column (Russian: Алекса́ндровская коло́нна, Aleksandrovskaya kolonna), also known as Alexandrian Column (Russian: Александри́йская коло́нна, Aleksandriyskaya kolonna), is the focal point of Palace Square in Saint Petersburg, Russia. The monument was raised after the Russian victory in the war with Napoleon's France. The column is named for Emperor Alexander I of Russia, who reigned from 1801 to 1825.

== Column ==
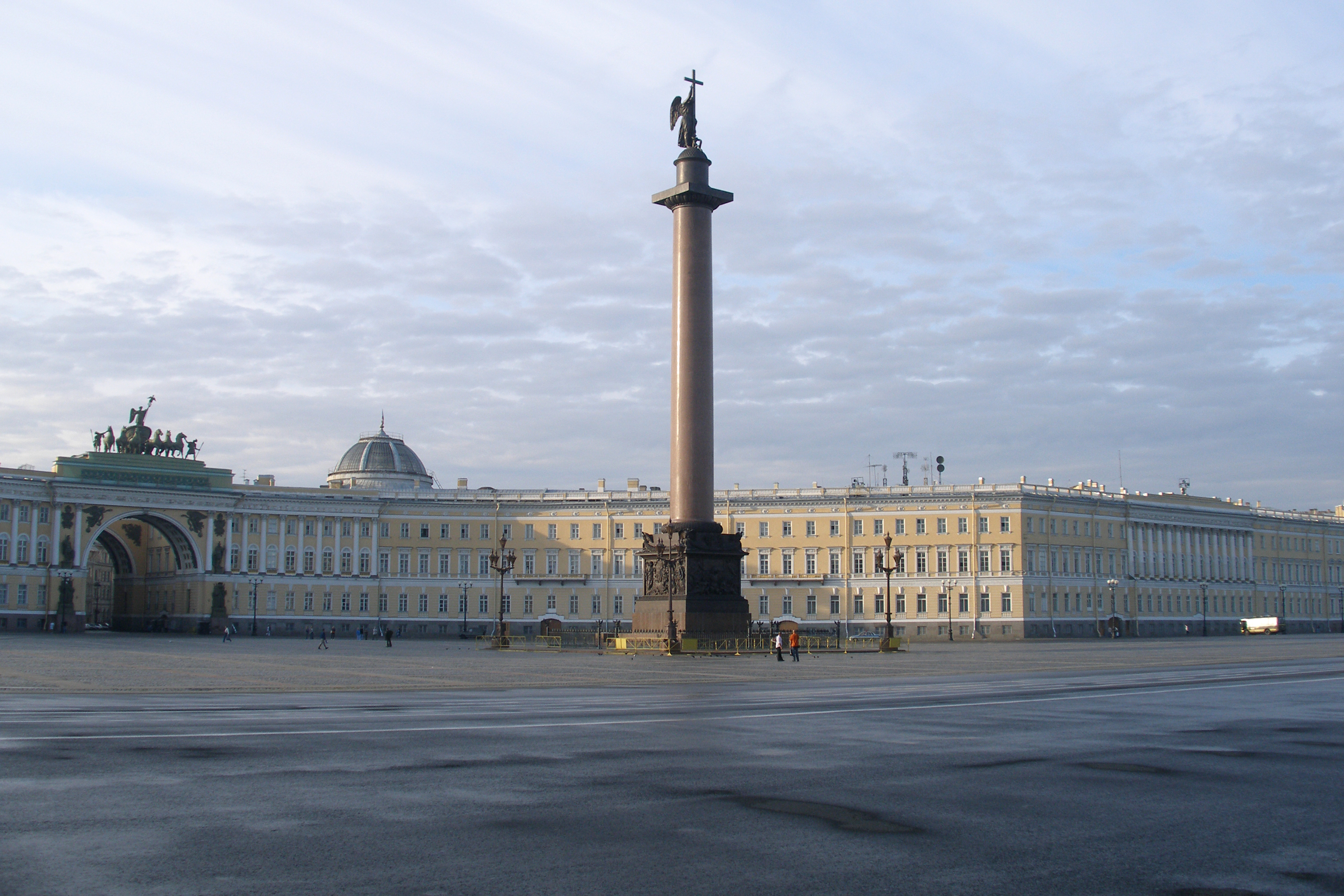
The Alexander Column in the Palace Square

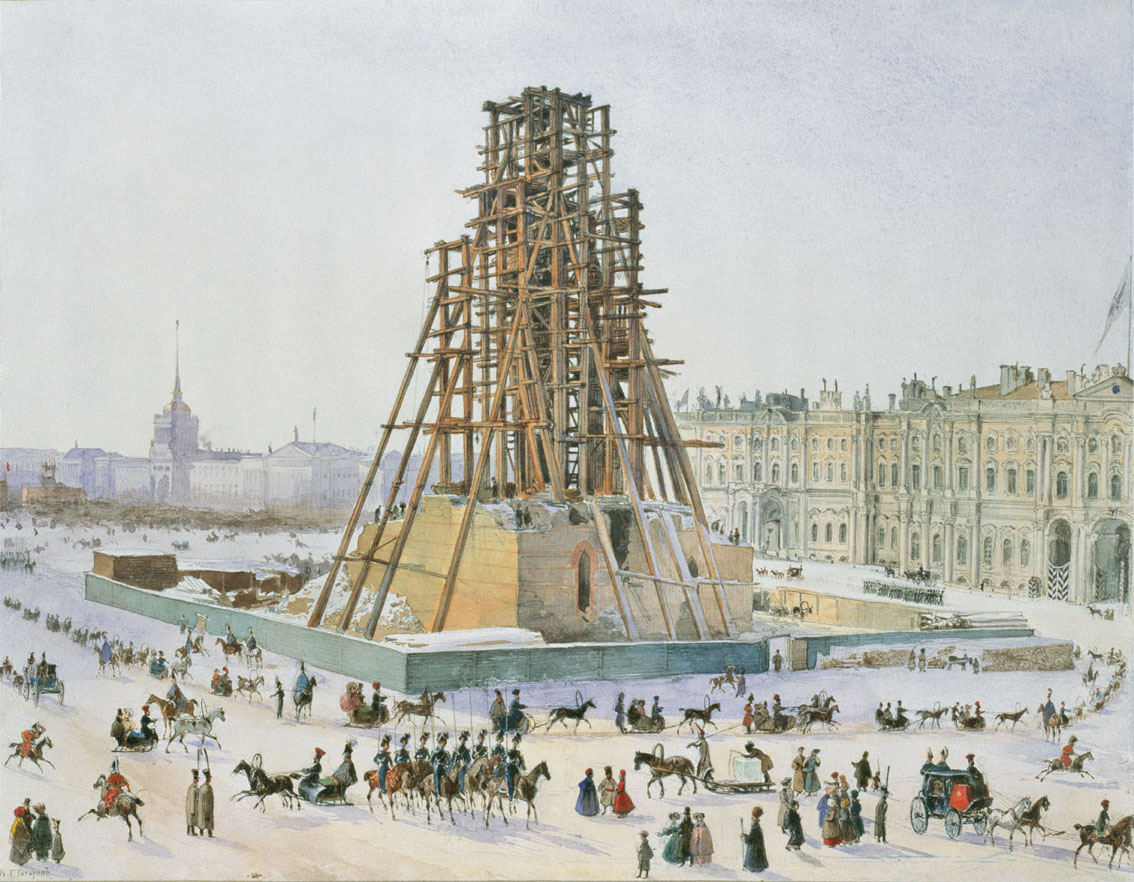
"The Alexander Column in scaffolds" (1832–1834), by Grigory Gagarin.

The Alexander Column was designed by the French-born architect Auguste de Montferrand, built between 1830 and 1834 designed by Swiss-born architect Antonio Adamini, and unveiled on 30 August 1834 (St. Alexander of Constantinople's Day).

The monument is claimed to be the tallest monolith of its kind in the world at 47.5 metres (156 ft) tall and is topped with a statue of an angel holding a cross.

The column is a single piece of red granite, 25.45 metres (83.5 ft) long and about 3.5 metres (11 ft) in diameter. The granite monolith was obtained from Virolahti, Finland and in 1832 transported by sea to Saint Petersburg, on a barge specially designed for this purpose, where it underwent further working.

The column, weighing c. 600 tonnes (1,300,000 lb), was erected on 30 August 1832 by 3,000 men in less than 2 hours, under the guidance of William Handyside. It is set so neatly that no attachment to the base is needed and it is fixed in position by its own weight alone.

The statue of the angel was designed by the Russian sculptor Boris Orlovsky. The face of the angel bears great similarity to the face of Emperor Alexander I.

== Pedestal ==
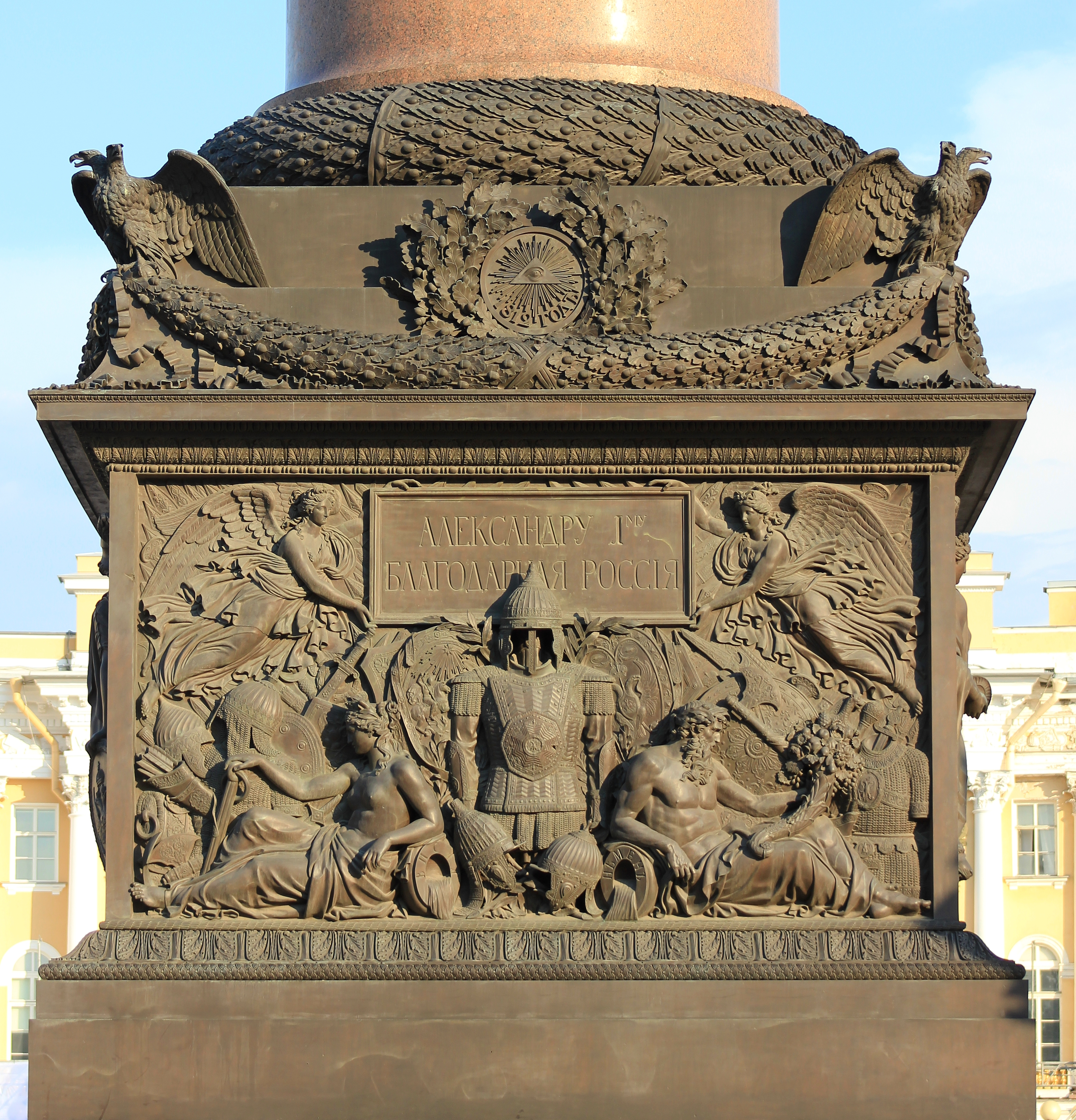
Pedestal decorations of Alexander column

The pedestal of the Alexander Column is decorated with symbols of military glory, sculpted by Giovanni Battista Scotti.

On the side of the pedestal facing the Winter Palace is a bas-relief depicting winged figures holding up a plaque bearing the words "To Alexander I from a grateful Russia". The composition includes figures representing the Neman and Vistula rivers that were associated with the events of the Patriotic War. Flanking these figures are depictions of old Russian armour – the shield of Prince Oleg of Novgorod, the helmet of Alexander Nevsky, the breastplate of Emperor Alexander I, the chainmail of Yermak Timofeyevich and other pieces recalling heroes whose martial feats brought glory to Russia.

The other three sides are decorated with bas-reliefs featuring allegorical figures of Wisdom and Abundance, Justice and Mercy, Peace and Victory, the last holding a shield bearing the dates 1812, 1813 and 1814. These compositions are enhanced by depictions of Ancient Roman military symbols and Russian armour.

The sketches for the bas-reliefs were produced by Auguste de Montferrand. He coordinated the scale of their compositions with the monumental forms of the monument. The panels were designed to the planned size by the artist Giovanni Battista Scotti. The models were produced by the sculptors Piotr Svintsov and Ivan Lepee, the ornamental embellishments by sculptor Yevgeny Balin. The casting of the bronze was done at Charles Baird's works in Saint Petersburg.

A commemorative silver rouble designed by N. Gube was struck in 1834 and it is rumoured that a chest of these coins was placed in the foundations.

== Later years ==
In 1952, according to some recent reports, the authorities of the Soviet Union demanded the replacement of the statue of the angel with a statue of Joseph Stalin. A historic cast-iron railing around the column was removed during the Soviet period. The railing was restored in 2002.

== See also ==
- List of largest monoliths in the world
- Victoria Memorial at the centre of the Queen's Gardens in front of Buckingham Palace in London, UK (20th century)
