= Saint Isaac's Cathedral =

Cathedral in Saint Petersburg, Russia

Coordinates: 59.9341°N 30.3062°E

- Исаакиевский собор
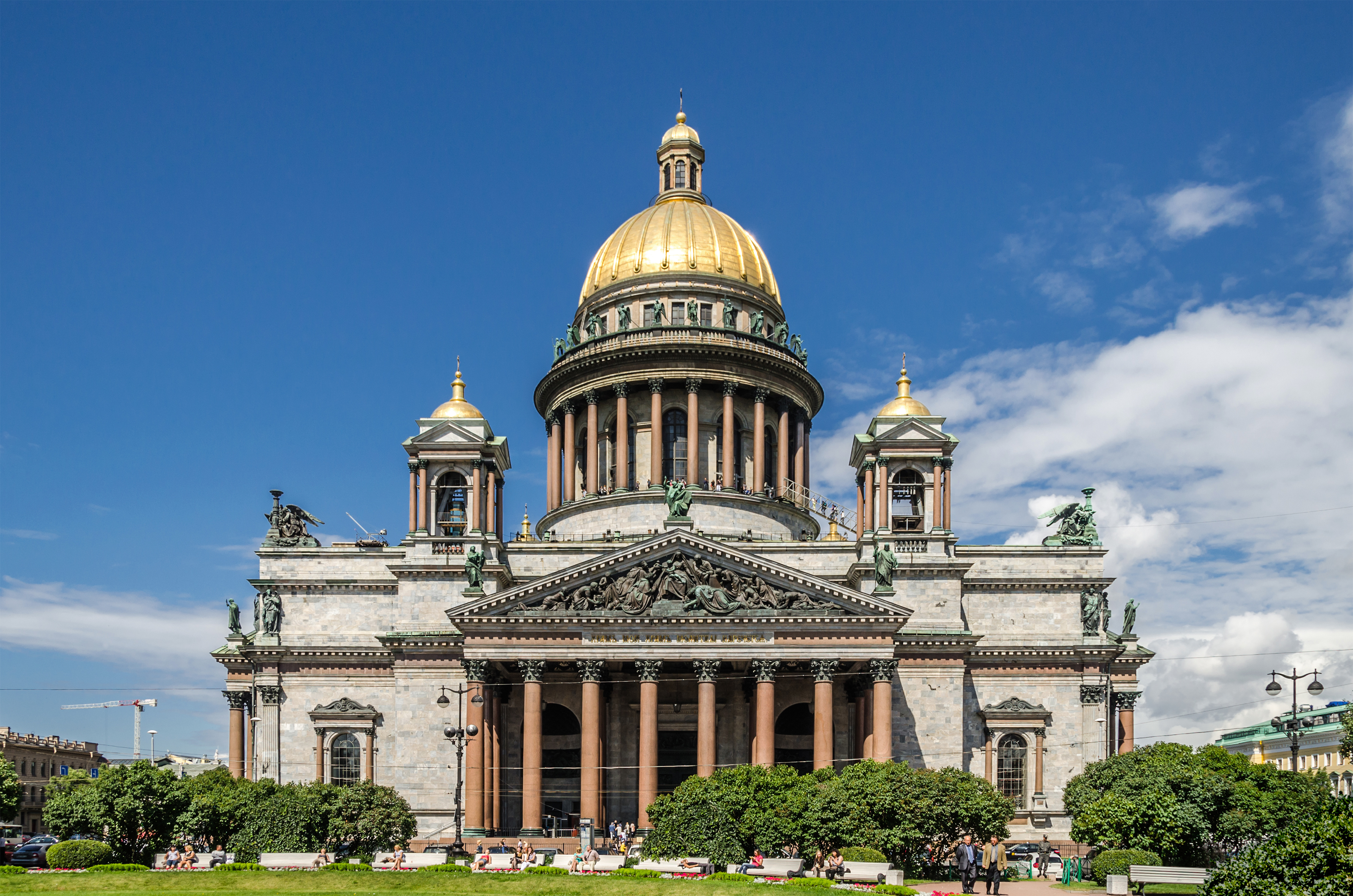

Religion
- Affiliation: Secular (State Russian Museum); Russian Orthodox
- Status: Museum, with church services in side chapel

Location
- Location: Saint Isaac's Square 4, Saint Petersburg, Russia
- Interactive map of Saint Isaac's Cathedral

Architecture
- Architect: Auguste de Montferrand
- Style: Late Neoclassical, Byzantine and Greek (cross church)
- Completed: 1858

Specifications
- Capacity: 12,000
- Length: 104.5 m (interior); 111.3 m (stairs)
- Width: 91 m (interior); 97.6 m (stairs)
- Interior area: 7,000 m^{2} (interior); 8,000 m^{2} (stairs); 260,000 m^{3} (volume)
- Height (max): 101.52 m (top cross); 31.5 m (nave interior); 80 m (dome ceiling)
- Dome dia. (outer): 25.8 m

Website
- Cathedral.ru

Saint Isaac's Cathedral (Russian: Исаакиевский собор, romanized: Isaakiyevskiy sobor, lit. 'Isaac's Cathedral') is a large architectural landmark cathedral that currently functions as a museum with occasional church services in Saint Petersburg, Russia. It is dedicated to Saint Isaac of Dalmatia, a patron saint of Peter the Great, who had been born on the feast day of that saint. It was originally built as a cathedral but was turned into a museum by the Soviet government in 1931 and has remained a museum ever since, with church services held in a side chapel since the 1990s. In 2017, the governor of St. Petersburg offered to transfer the cathedral back to the Russian Orthodox Church, but this was not accomplished due to the protests of St. Petersburg citizens opposing the offer.

== History ==
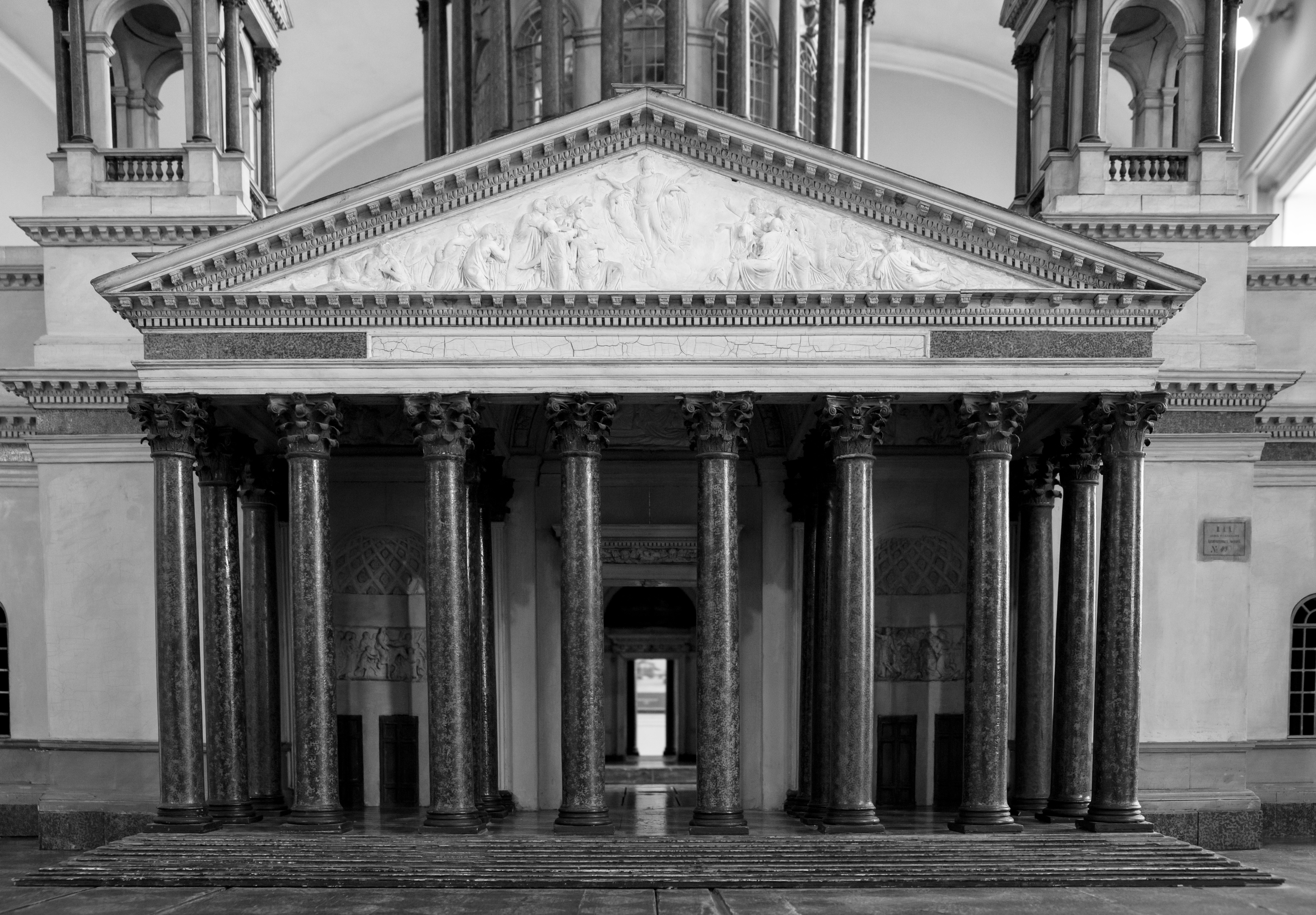
Design model of the cathedral, 1818–1821, designed by Montferrand, wood, plaster, metal, oil paint, gilding, collection of St. Petersburg Academy of Arts

The church on Saint Isaac's Square was ordered by Tsar Alexander I, to replace an earlier structure by Vincenzo Brenna, and was the fourth consecutive church standing at this place. A specially appointed commission examined several designs, including that of the French-born architect Auguste de Montferrand (1786–1858), who had studied in the atelier of Napoleon's designer, Charles Percier. Montferrand's design was criticised by some members of the commission for the dry and allegedly boring rhythm of its four identical pedimented octastyle porticos. It was also suggested that despite gigantic dimensions, the edifice would look squat and not very impressive. The members of the commission, which consisted of well-known Russian architects, were also particularly concerned by the necessity of building a new huge building on the old unsecure foundation. The emperor, who favoured the ponderous Empire style of architecture, stepped in and solved the dispute in Montferrand's favour.

The cathedral took 40 years to construct, under Montferrand's direction, from 1818 to 1858. To secure the construction, the cathedral's foundation was strengthened by driving 25,000 piles into the fenland of St. Petersburg. Innovative methods were created to erect the giant columns of the portico. The construction costs of the cathedral totalled an incredible sum of 1,000,000 gold rubles. Under the Soviet government, the building was stripped of religious trappings. In 1931, it was turned into the Museum of the History of Religion and Atheism, and the dove sculpture was removed and replaced by a Foucault pendulum. On 12 April 1931, the first public demonstration of the pendulum was held to visualize Copernicus' theory. In 1937, the museum was transformed into the museum of the cathedral, and its former collections were transferred to the Museum of the History of Religion (located in the Kazan Cathedral).

During World War II, the dome was painted over in gray to avoid attracting attention from enemy aircraft. On its top, in the skylight, a geodetic intersection point was placed, to determine the positions of German artillery batteries.

With the fall of communism, the museum was removed and regular worship activity resumed in the cathedral's left-hand side chapel. The main body of the cathedral is used for services on feast days only.

On 10 January 2017 Georgy Poltavchenko, the governor of St. Petersburg, announced that the cathedral would be transferred to the Russian Orthodox Church (ROC). The key protocols of the transfer were defined by an order issued by the city's Committee on Property Relations on 30 December 2016. The document expired on 30 December 2018. A new order could be issued upon request from the ROC, but no such request has been submitted as of 2019.

The transfer of Saint Isaac's Cathedral in use to the ROC was agreed on in January 2017, but the decision caused discontent of the citizens, who defended the status of the museum. The decision of the city authorities was disputed in the courts. As of 2019, the status of the building is museum. Church services are held there only on ecclesiastical occasions.

On 1 October 2021, Grand Duke George Mikhailovich of Russia and Victoria Romanovna Bettarini married at the cathedral in the first royal wedding to take place in Russia since 1917.

== Exterior ==
The neoclassical exterior expresses the traditional Russian-Byzantine formula of a Greek-cross ground plan with a large central dome and four subsidiary domes. It is similar to Andrea Palladio's Villa Capra "La Rotonda", with a full dome on a high drum substituted for the Villa's low central saucer dome. The design of the cathedral in general and the dome in particular later influenced the design of the United States Capitol dome, Wisconsin State Capitol in Madison, Wisconsin, and the Lutheran Cathedral in Helsinki.

The exterior is faced with gray and pink stone, and features a total of 112 red granite columns with Corinthian capitals, each hewn and erected as a single block: 48 at ground level, 24 on the rotunda of the uppermost dome, 8 on each of four side domes, and 2 framing each of four windows. The rotunda is encircled by a walkway accessible to tourists. 24 statues stand on the roof, and another 24 on top of the rotunda. The columns were made in Pyterlahti quarry in Virolahti, Finland.

== Dome ==
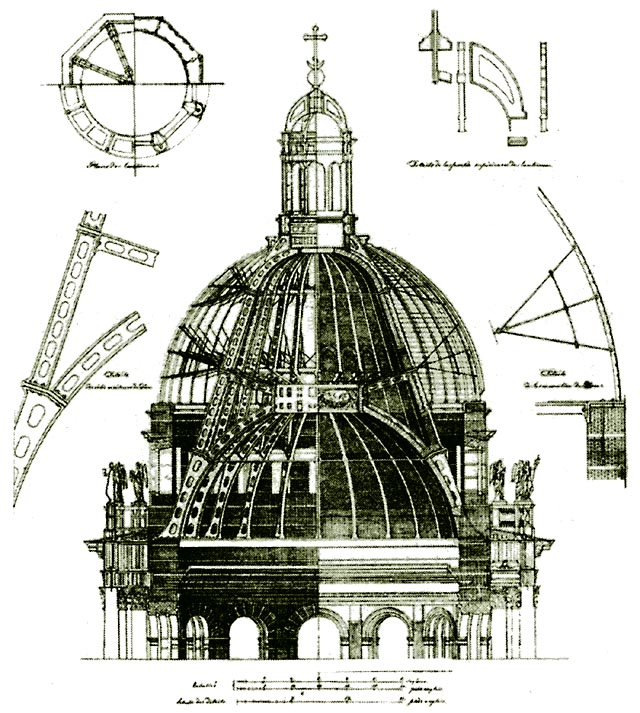
Montferrand's design of the dome is based on a supporting cast iron structure, and was only the third dome to be constructed this way

The cathedral's main dome rises 101.5 metres (333 ft); its exterior is gilded. The dome is decorated with twelve statues of angels by Josef Hermann. These angels were likely the first large sculptures produced by the then-novel process of electrotyping, which was an alternative to traditional bronze casting of sculptures. Montferrand's design of the dome is based on a supporting cast iron structure. It was the third historical instance of a cast iron cupola after the Leaning Tower of Nevyansk (1732) and Mainz Cathedral (1826).

With an internal height of 69 m (from the floor to the level of the oculus), it ranks among the tallest domes in the world.

== Interior ==
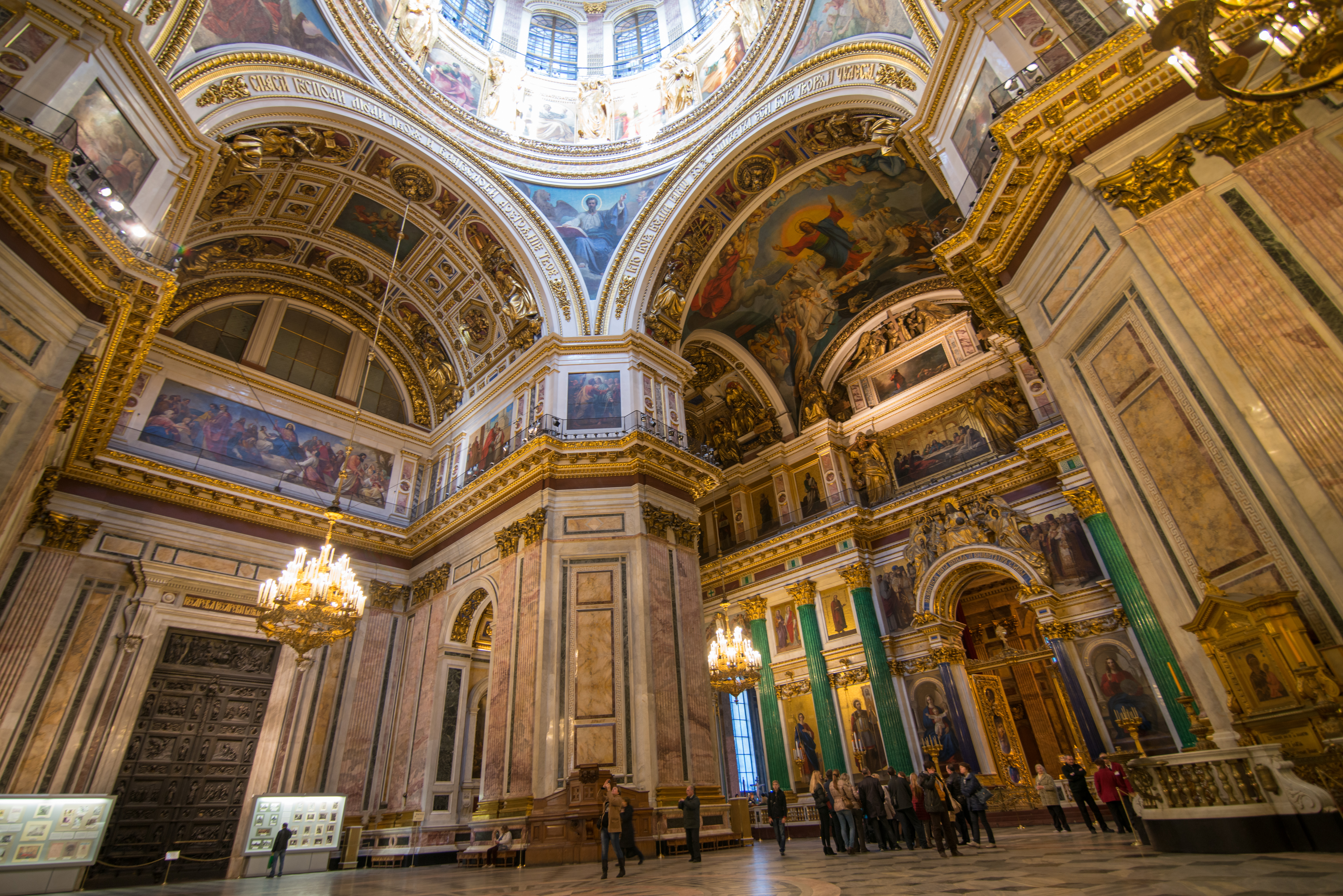
St. Isaac's Cathedral interior

The cathedral's bronze doors, covered in reliefs by Ivan Vitali, are patterned after the celebrated doors of the Battistero di San Giovanni in Florence, designed by Lorenzo Ghiberti. Suspended underneath the peak of the dome is a sculpted white dove representing the Holy Spirit. Internal features such as columns, pilasters, floor, and statue of Montferrand are composed of multicolored granites and marbles gathered from all parts of Russia. The iconostasis is framed by eight columns of semiprecious stone: six of malachite and two smaller ones of lazurite. The four pediments are also richly sculpted.

The interior was originally decorated with scores of paintings by Karl Bryullov and other great Russian masters of the day. When these paintings began to deteriorate due to the cold, damp conditions inside the cathedral, Montferrand ordered them to be painstakingly reproduced as mosaics, a technique introduced in Russia by Mikhail Lomonosov. This work was never completed.

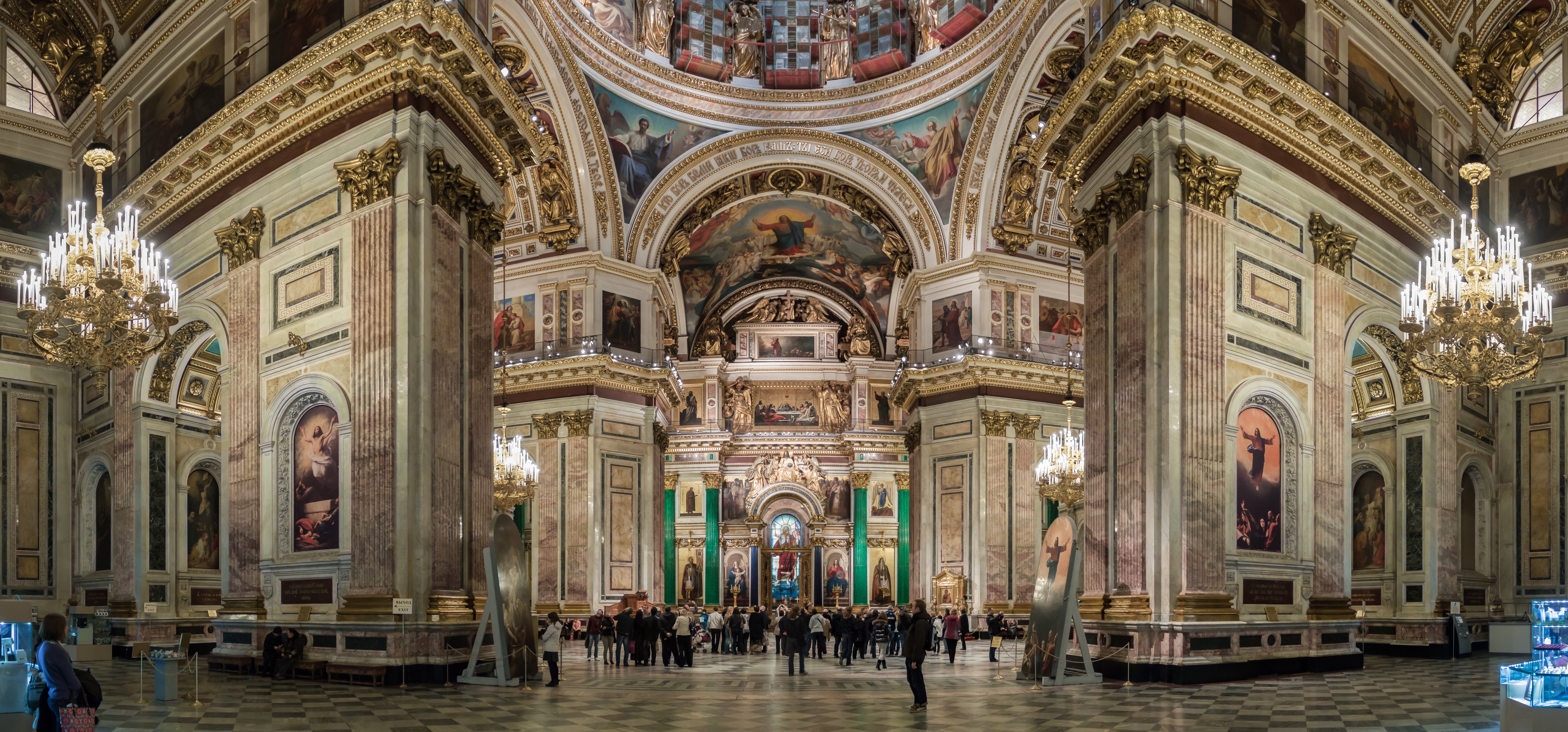
View of the interior space of the church

== Technologies ==
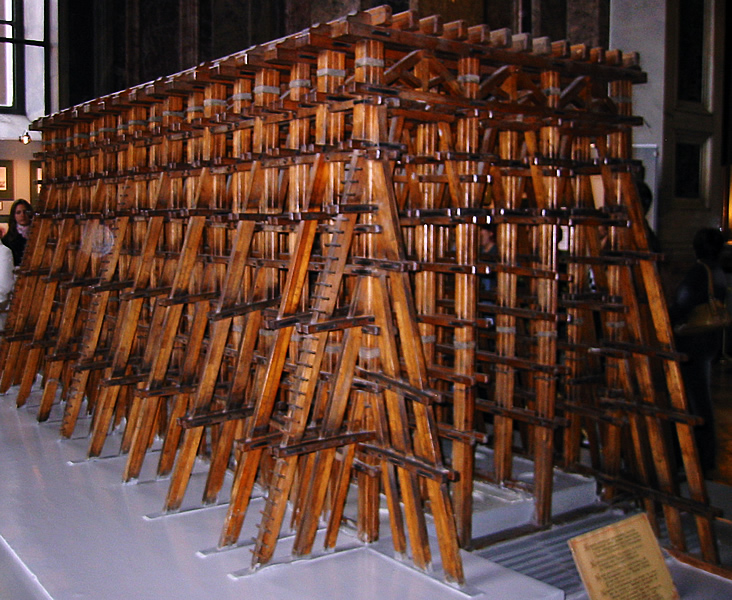
A model of the wooden framework used to erect the columns of St. Isaac's Cathedral is on display inside

William Handyside and other engineers used a number of technological innovations in the construction of the building. The portico columns were raised with the use of large wooden frameworks before the walls were erected. The building rests on 10,000 tree trunks that were sunk by a large number of workers into the marshy banks upon which the cathedral is situated. The dome was gilded by a technique similar to spraypainting; the solution used included toxic mercury, the vapors of which caused the deaths of sixty workers. The dozen gilded statues of angels, each six metres tall, facing each other across the interior of the rotunda, were constructed using galvanoplastic technology, making them only millimeters thick and very lightweight. St. Isaac's Cathedral represents the first use of this technique in architecture.

The painstakingly detailed work constructing St. Isaac's Cathedral took 40 years to complete. This extended construction is the source of an expression in the Finnish language, rakentaa kuin Iisakin kirkkoa "to build like St. Isaac's Church".

== Gallery ==
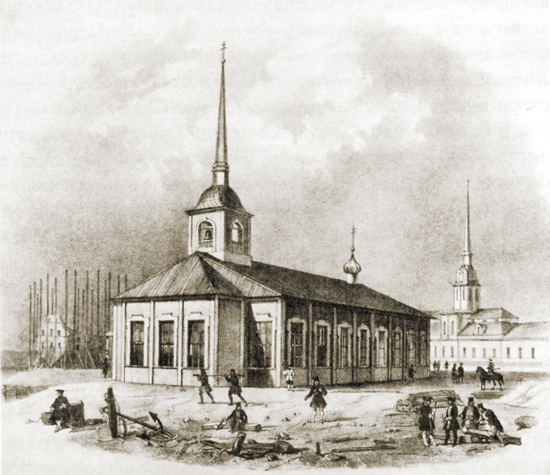
The first St. Isaac's Church (lithograph of Auguste de Montferrand's drawing, 1710)

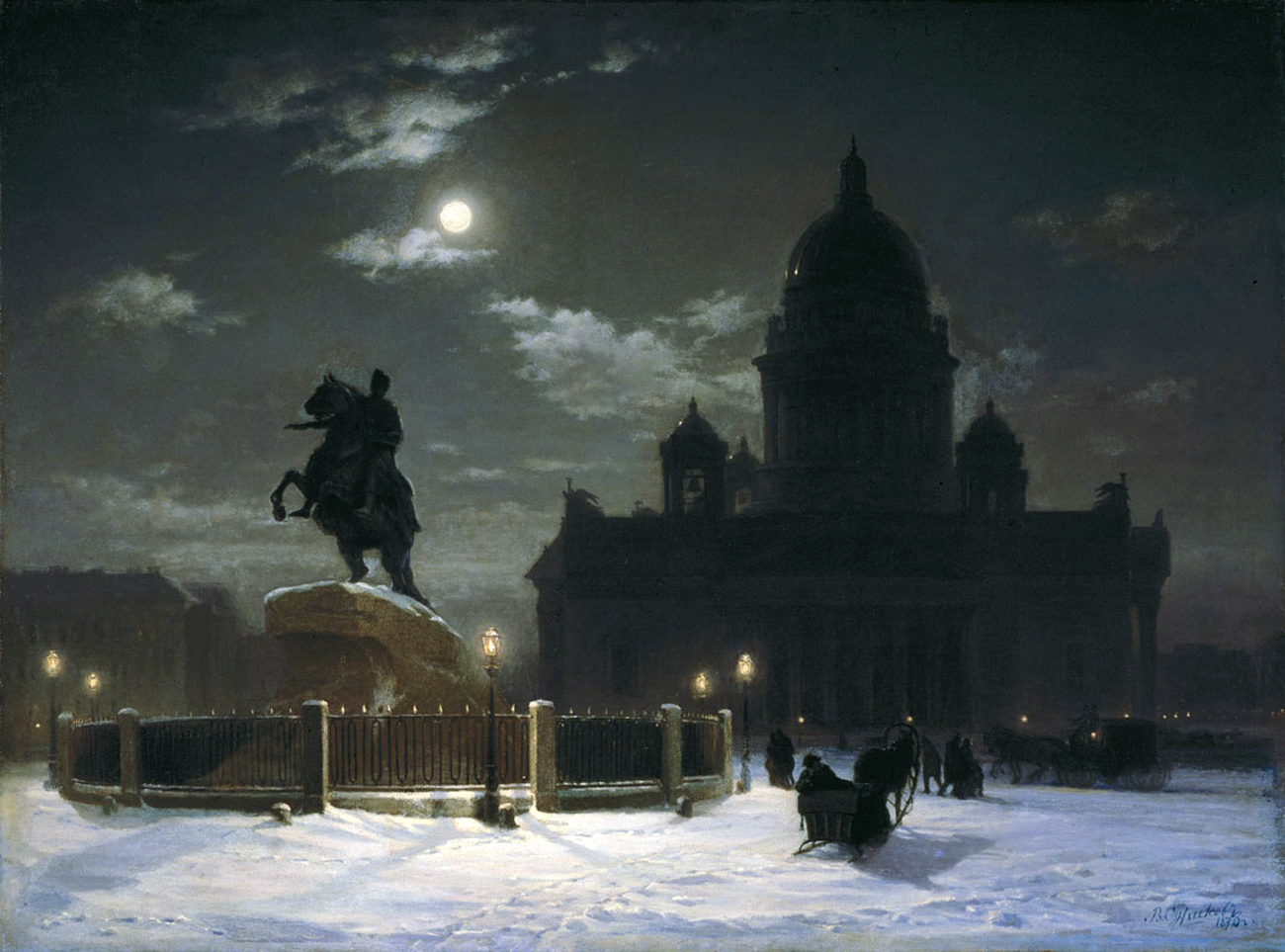
Vasily Surikov's view of the cathedral and the Bronze Horseman in front of it

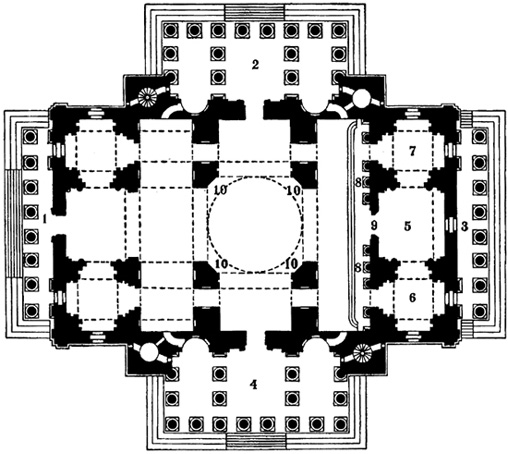
Floorplan of St. Isaac's Cathedral

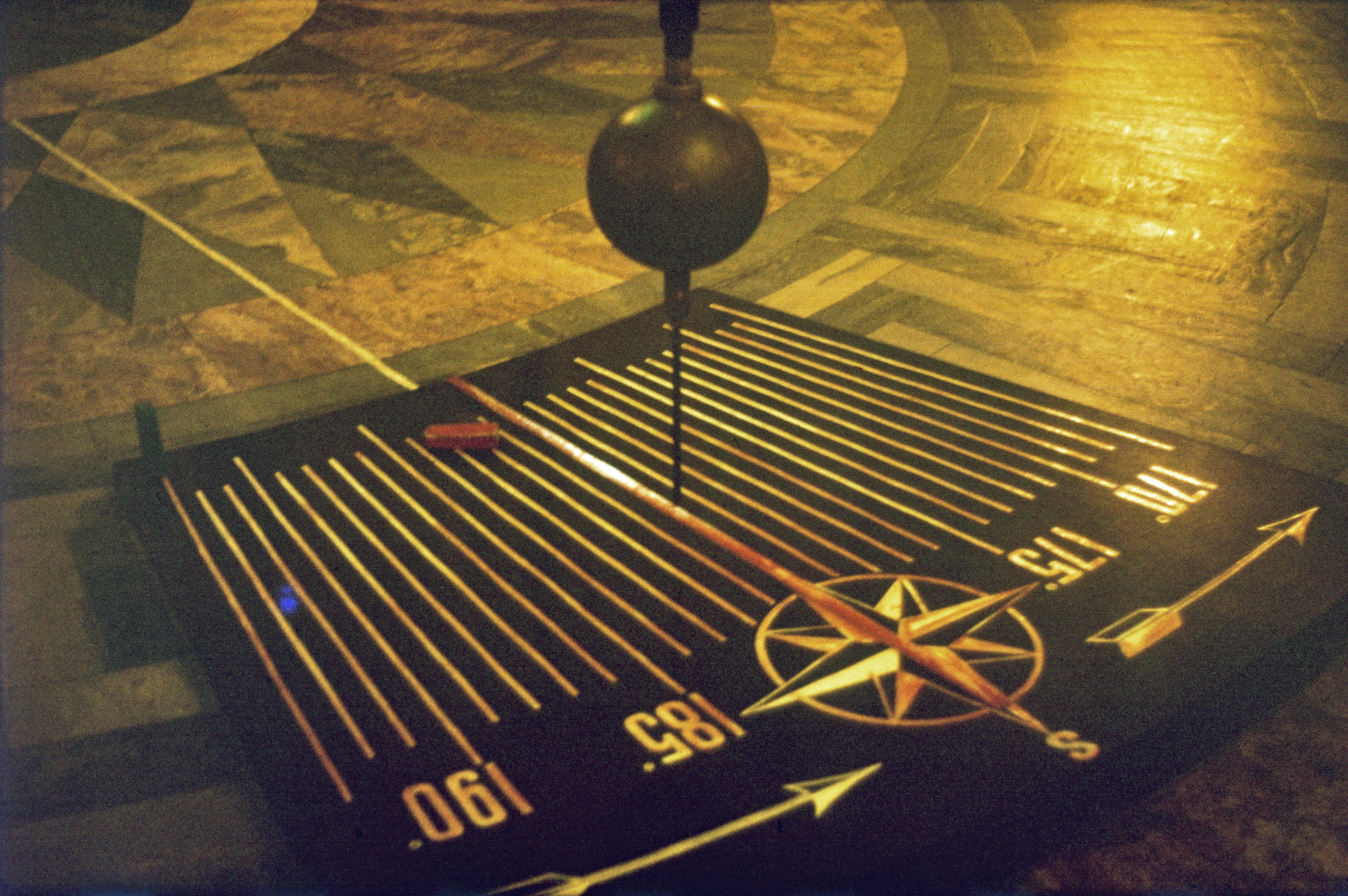
The Foucault pendulum formerly attached to the dome

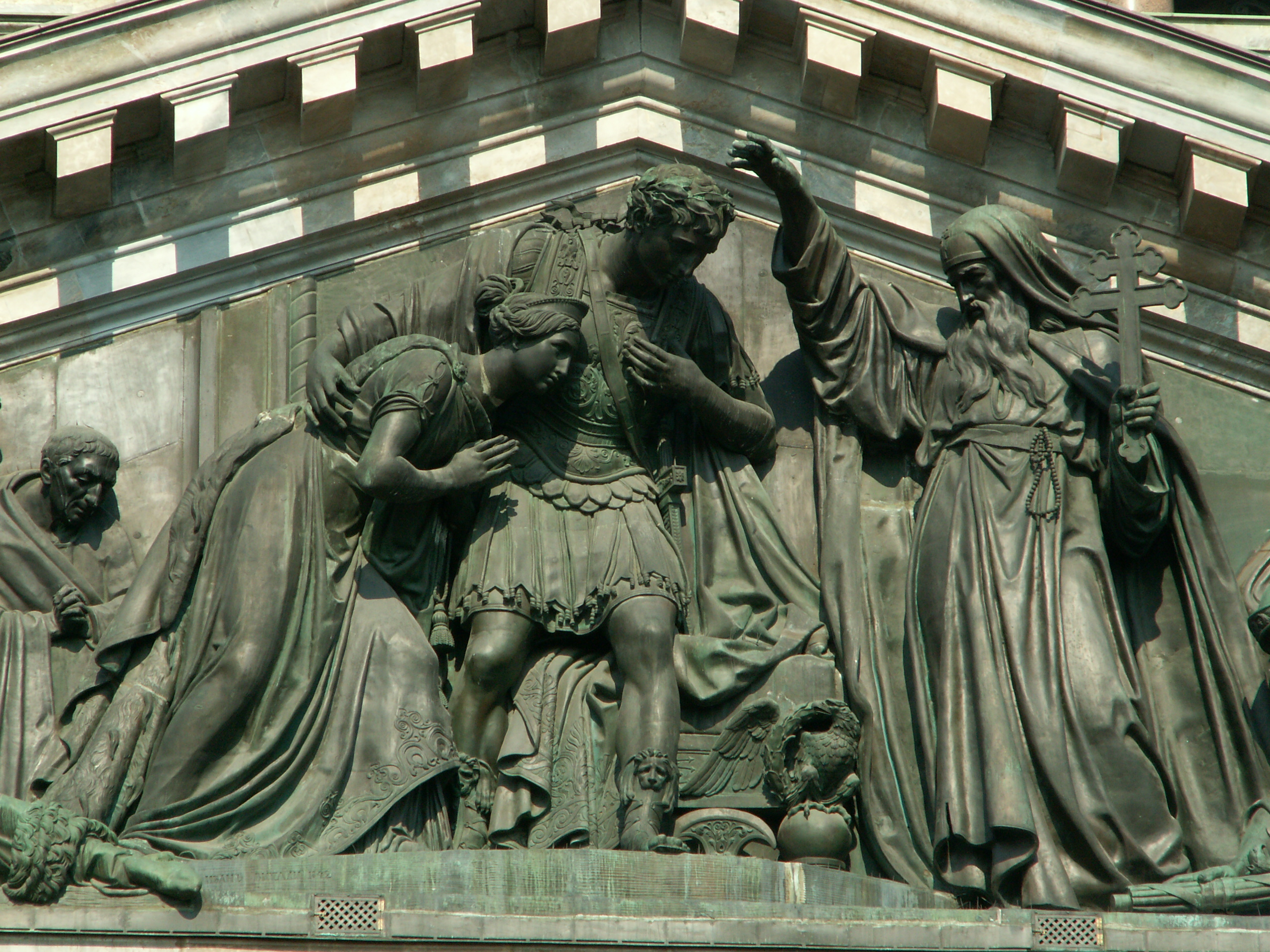
St. Isaac blessing the Emperor Theodosius and his wife Flaccilla

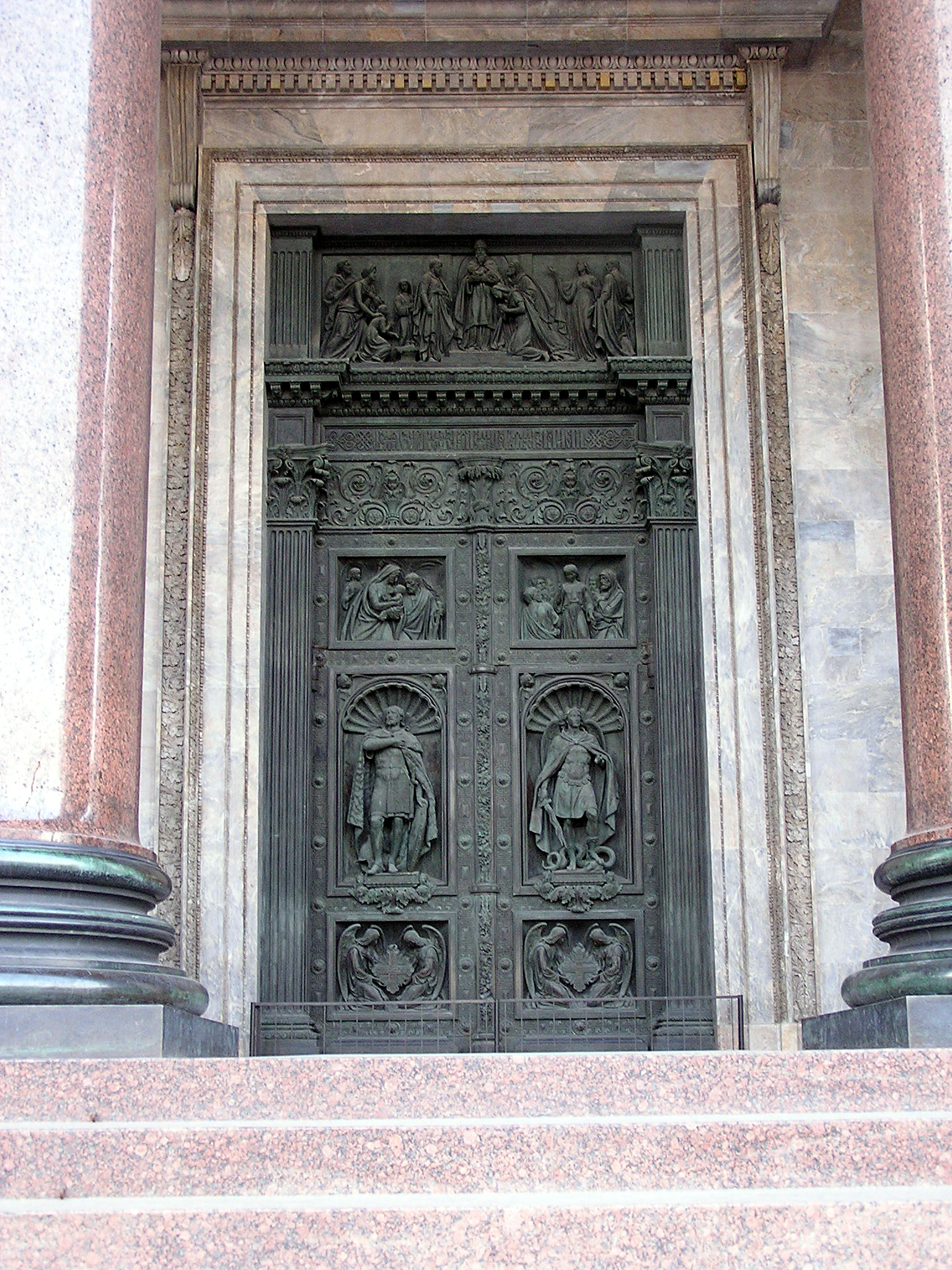
St. Isaac's southern doors, made of bronze

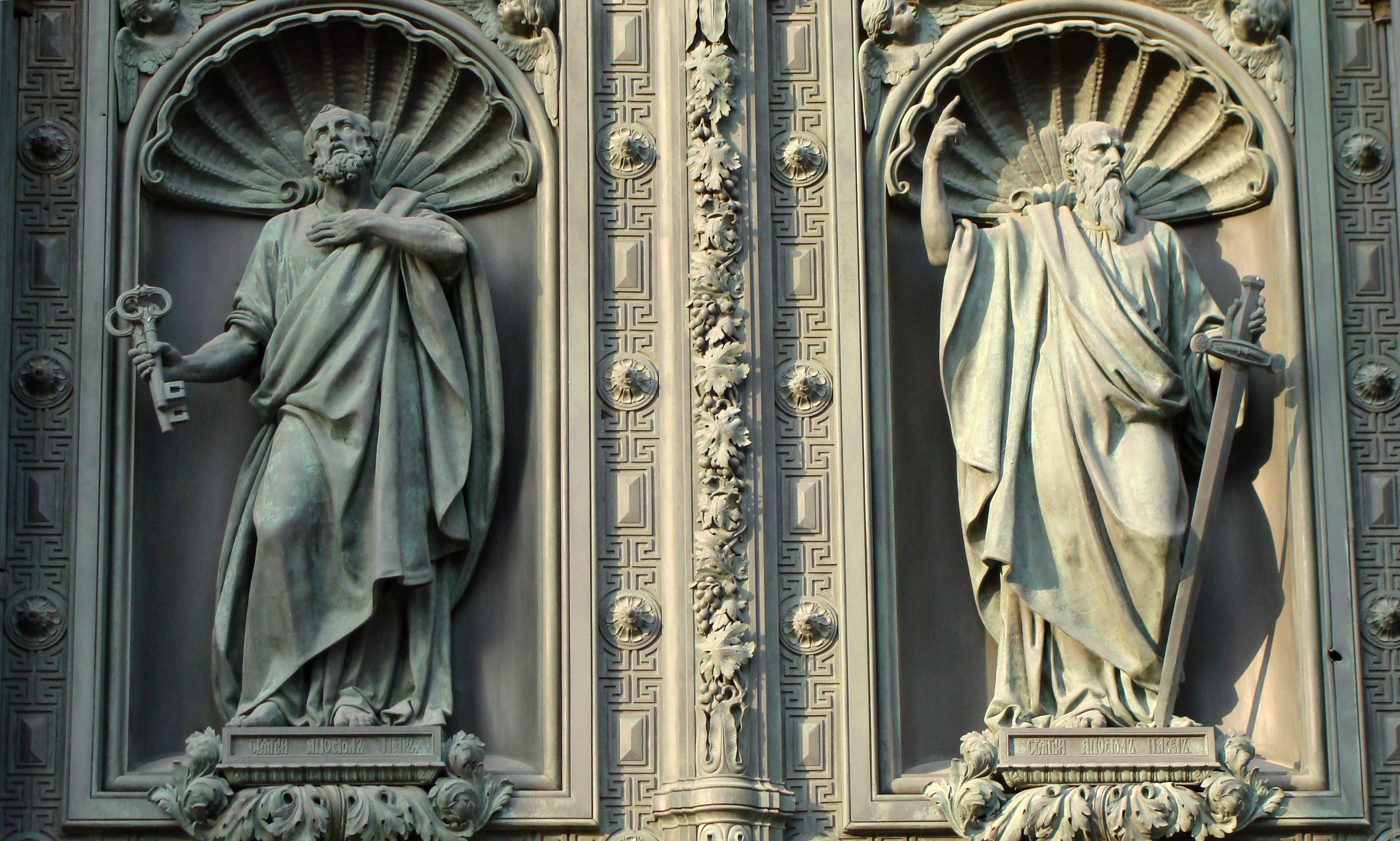
St. Isaac's western doors, detail showing the apostles Peter and Paul

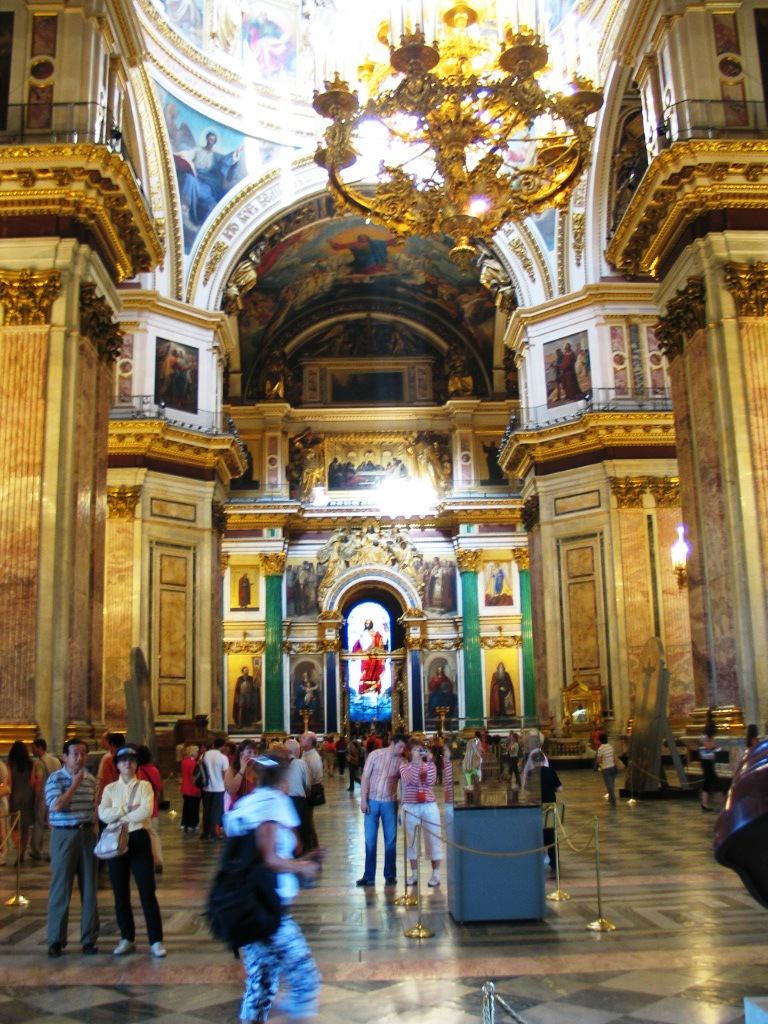
Interior of the cathedral

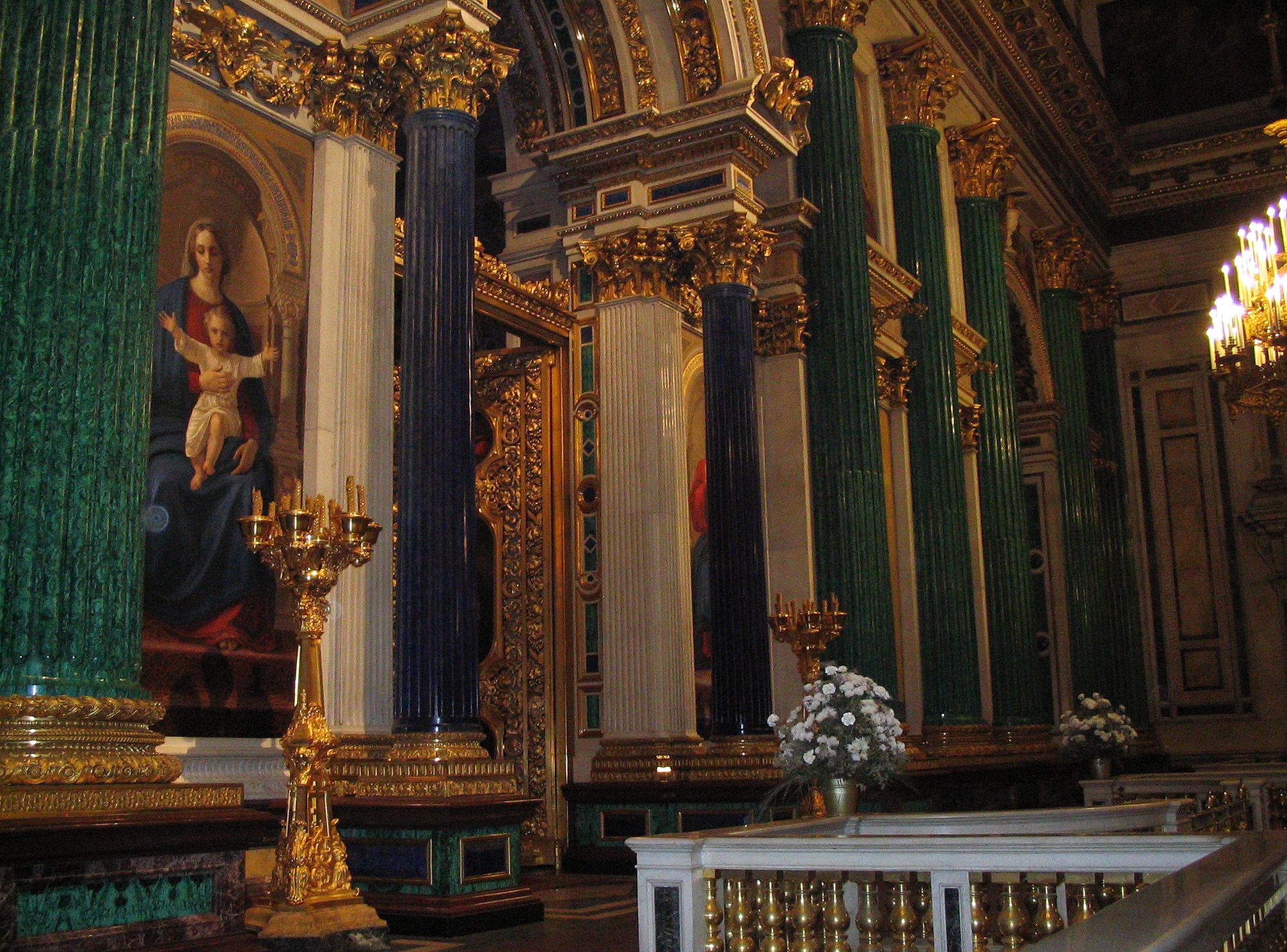
View of the main iconostasis, showing the malachite and lapis lazuli columns

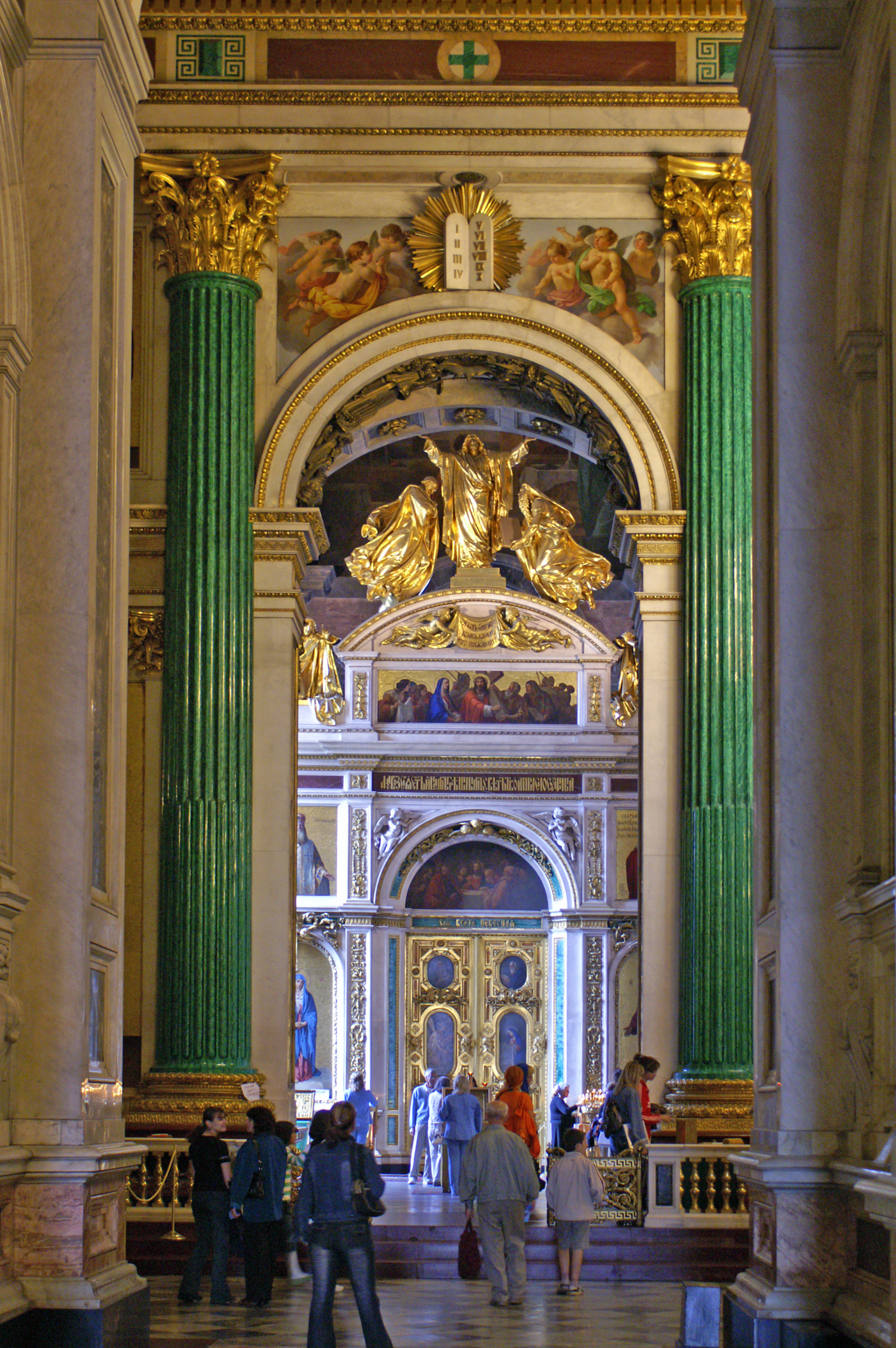
Iconostasis of one of the side chapels

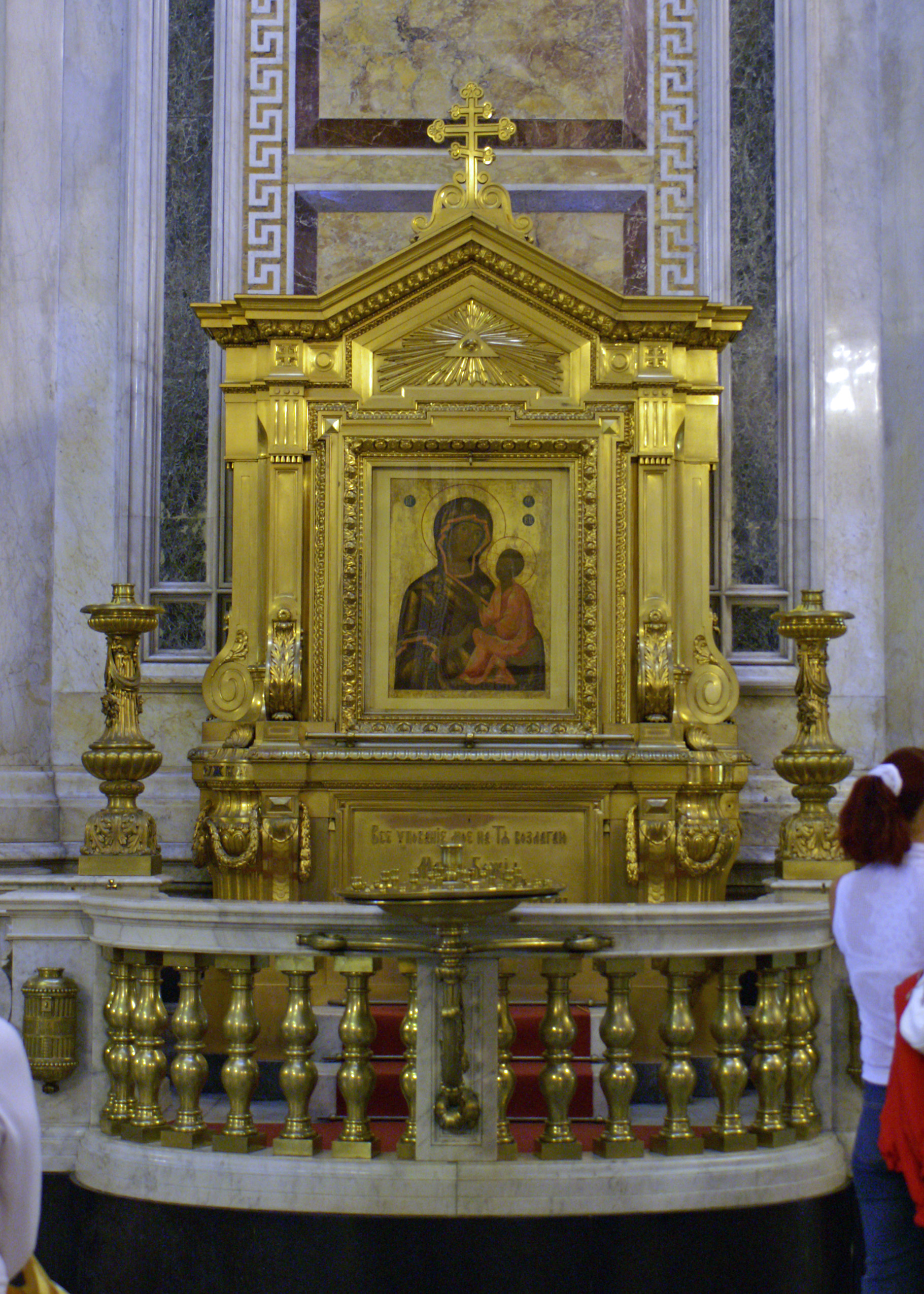
Shrine to the Tikhvin icon of the Theotokos

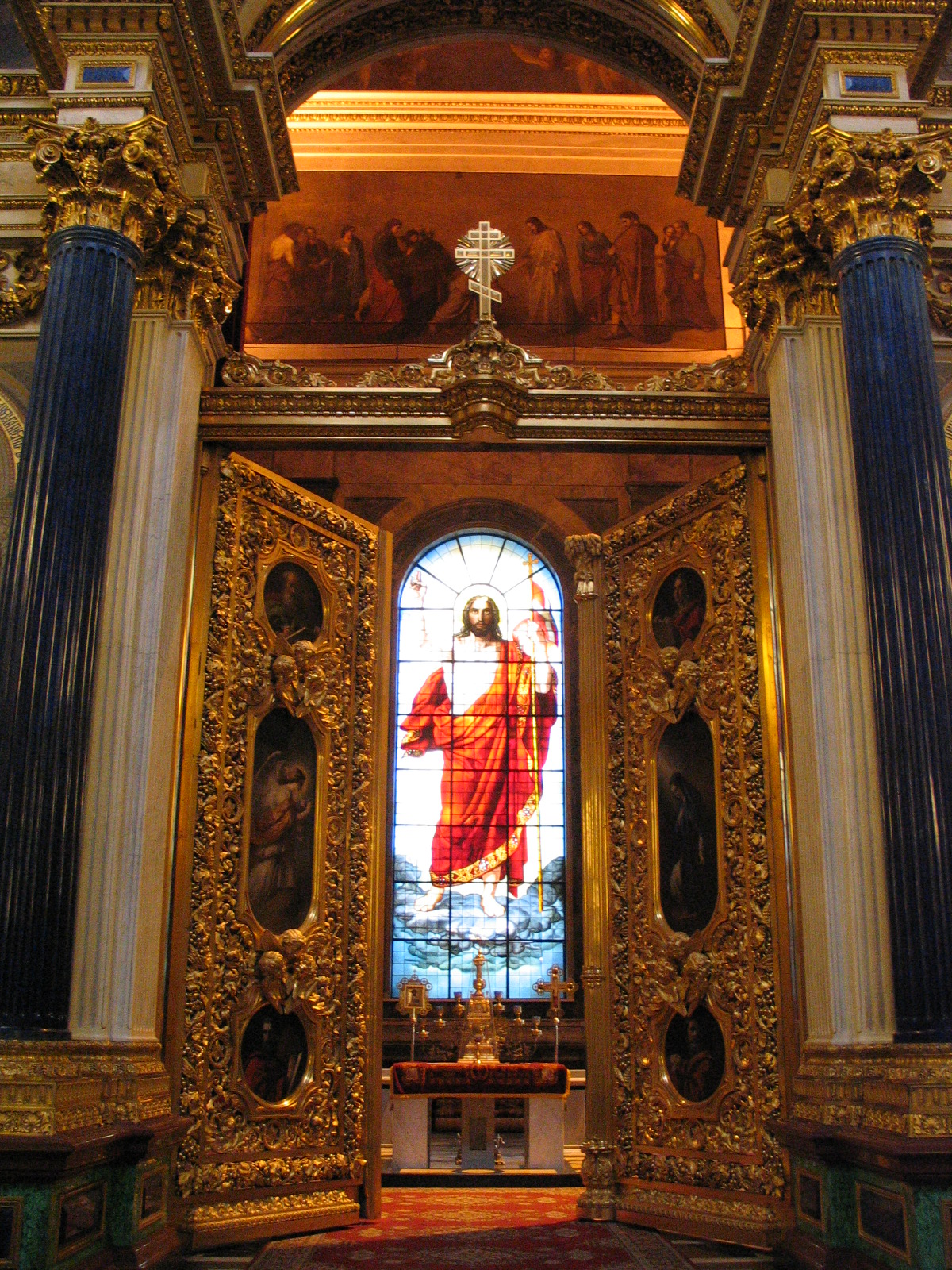
The sanctuary, seen through the Holy Doors during Bright Week

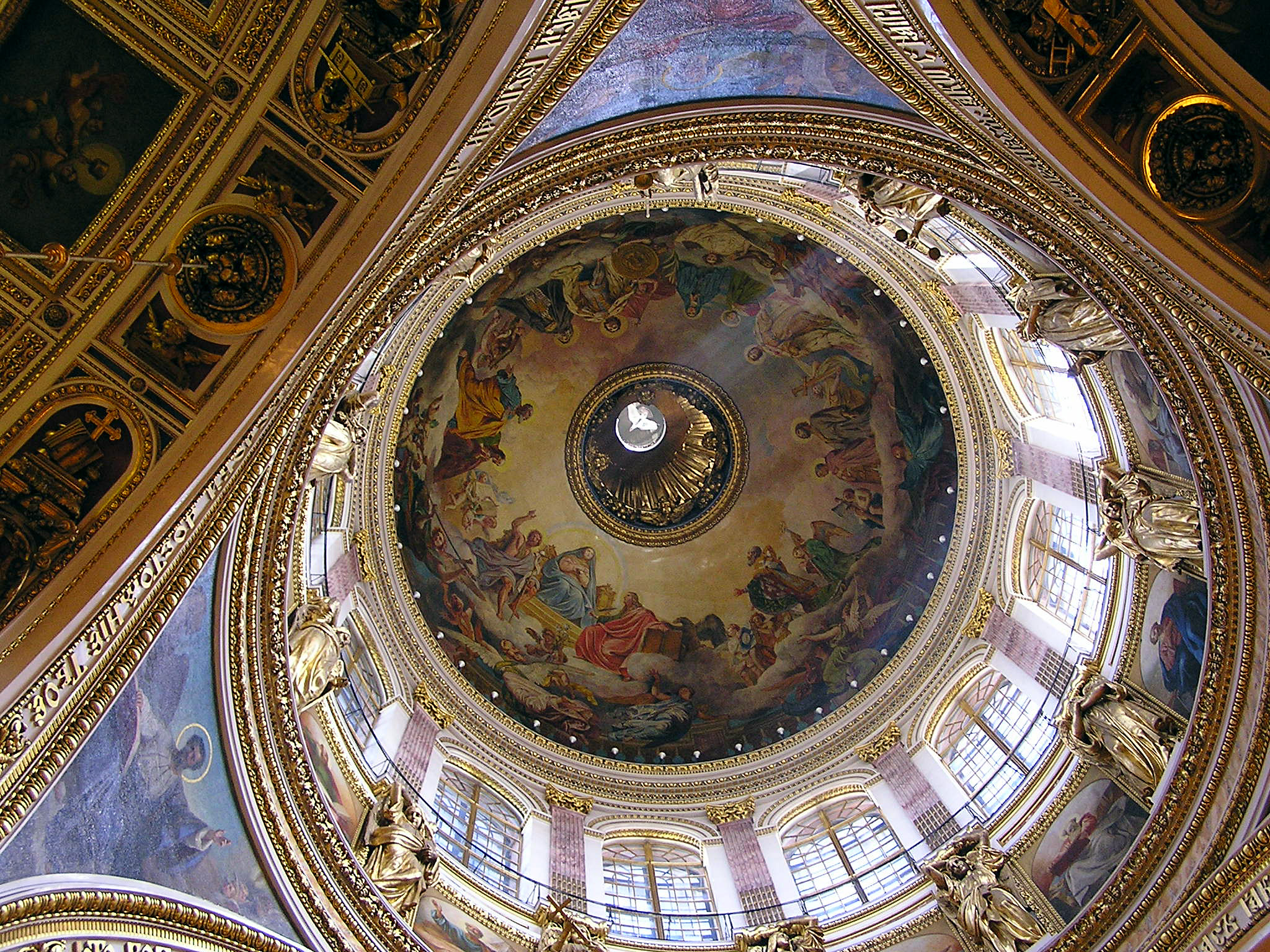
Interior of the great dome, honoring the Holy Spirit

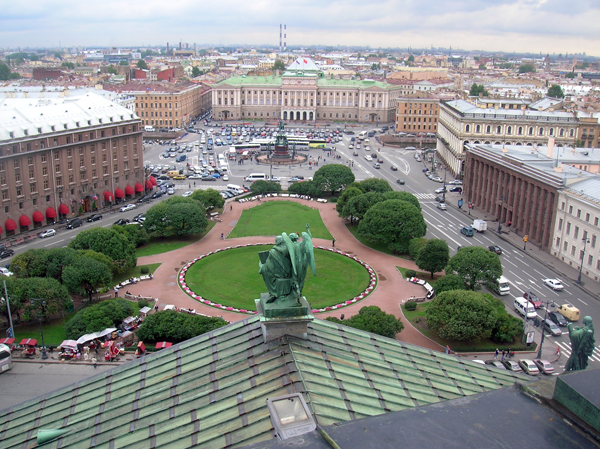
View looking out from the cathedral onto Isaac Square

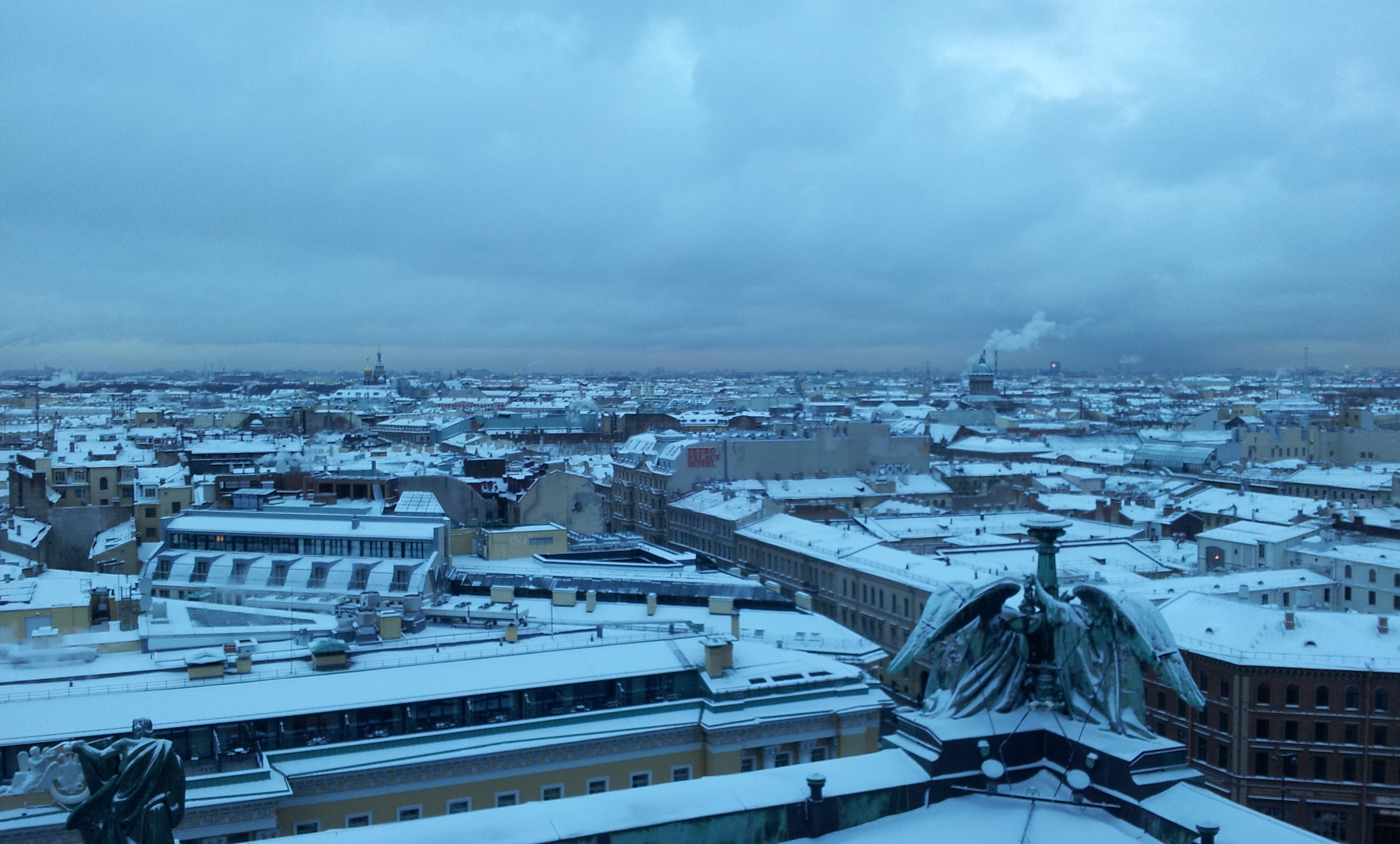
Photo from St Isaac's Cathedral

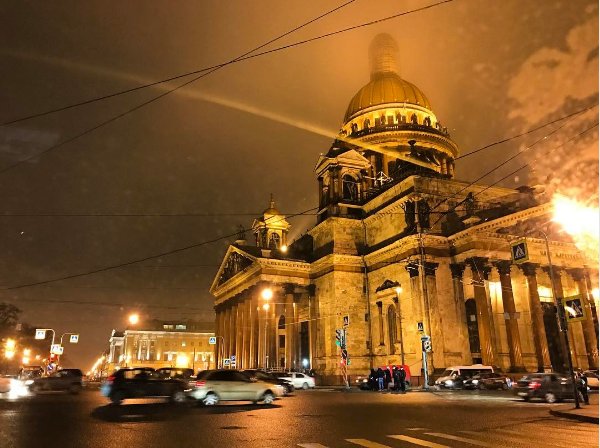
St. Isaac's Cathedral at night

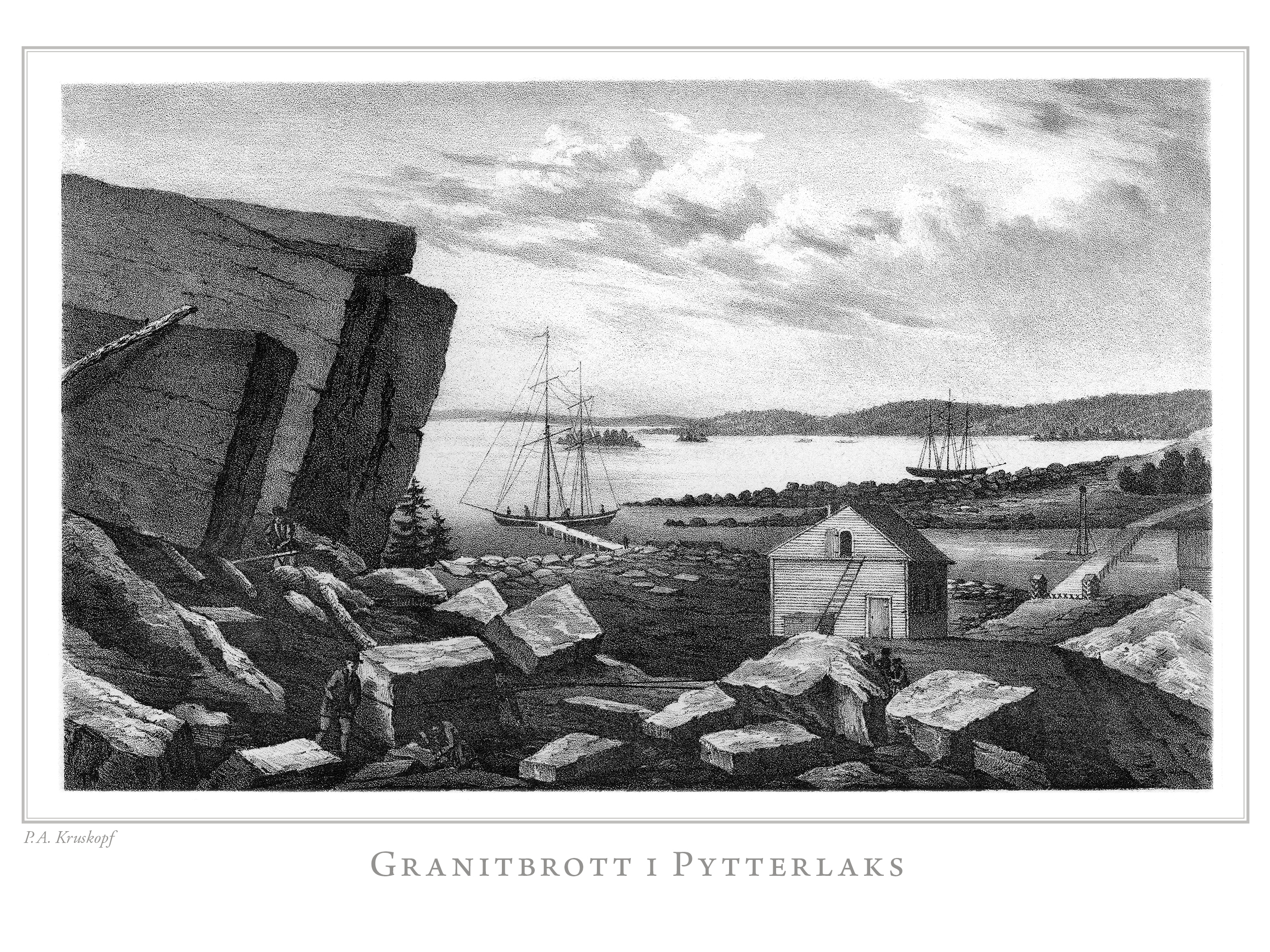
The columns were made in Pyterlahti quarry in Virolahti, Finland

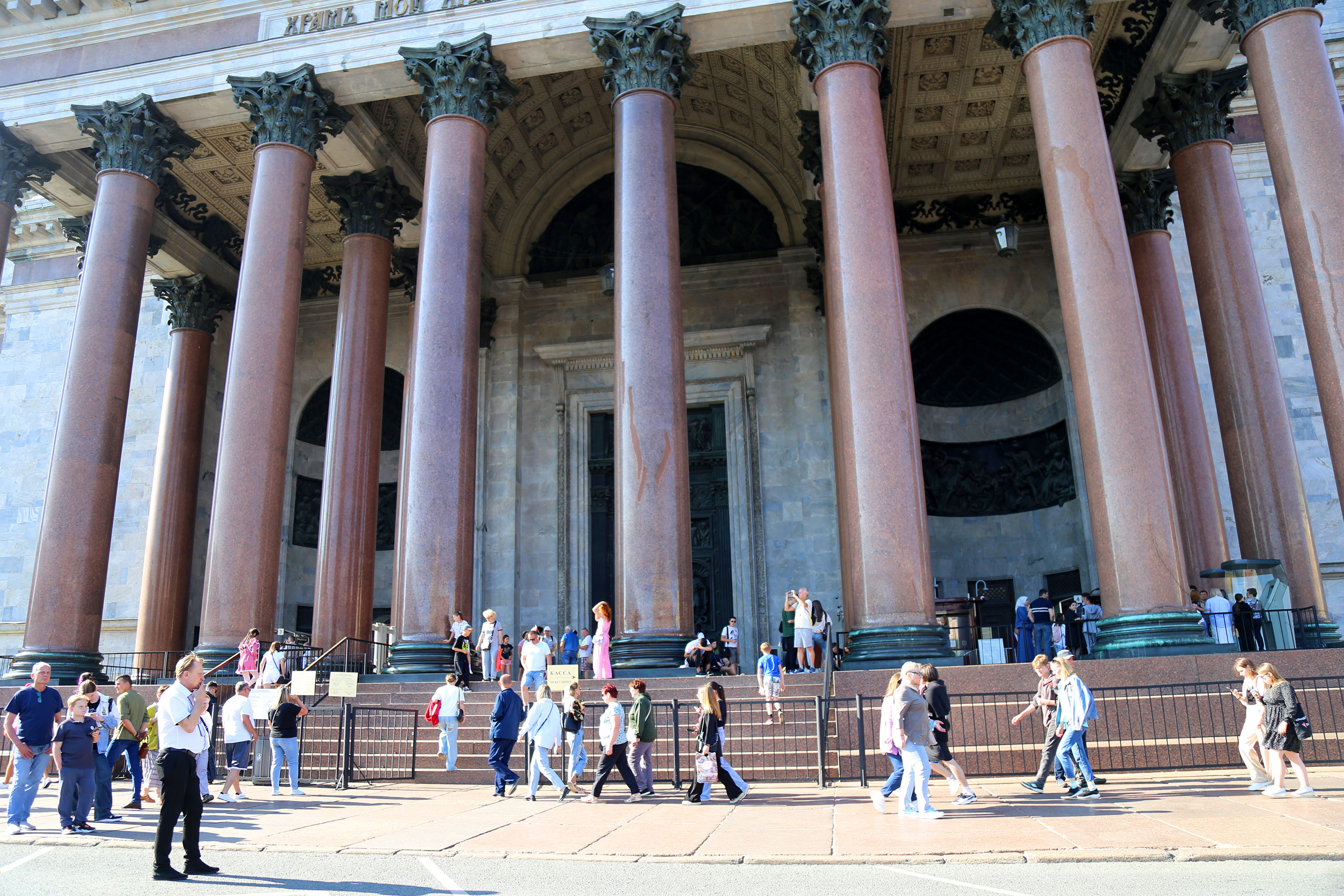
The portico

== See also ==
- Cathedral of Christ the Saviour
- List of tallest Eastern Orthodox church buildings
- List of largest Eastern Orthodox church buildings
