= Squires Gate =

Suburb and ward in Blackpool, England

Coordinates: 53.785°N 3.029°W

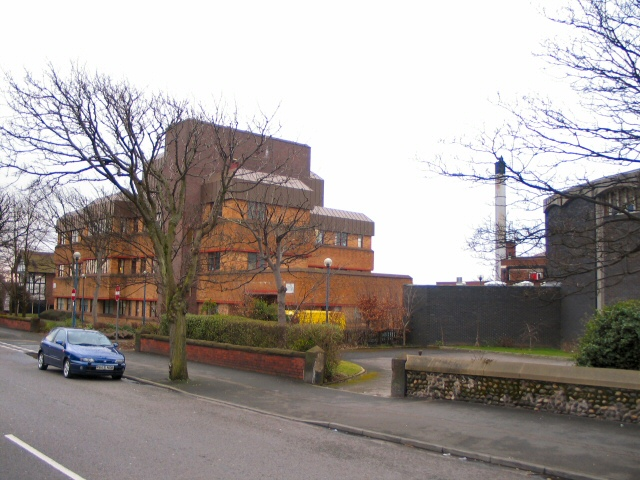
- The NHS hospital on Lytham Road, seen from outside St.Margaret's Catholic chapel, to the right of shot

- Location within Lancashire
- Unitary authority: Blackpool
- Ceremonial county: Lancashire
- Region: North West
- Country: England
- Sovereign state: United Kingdom
- Post town: BLACKPOOL
- Postcode district: FY4
- Dialling code: 01253

Squires Gate is a district and an electoral ward in South Shore, Blackpool on the Fylde coast, in the Blackpool district, in the ceremonial county of Lancashire, England. It is located at the south of the town near the boundary with Lytham St Annes. The population of the ward taken at the 2011 census was 6,437.

One of the most significant sites at Squires Gate was the holiday camp. Originally called Squires Gate camp, it became a Pontins holiday centre, but closed in October 2009 for a housing development. Prior to becoming a holiday camp, the camp was used as a military base during World War II.

Blackpool Airport is in Squires Gate, and the district also has a small railway station on the Blackpool South to Preston branch line.

Squires Gate is home to three non-league football clubs, with grounds very close to each other. A.F.C. Blackpool and Squires Gate F.C. both play in the North West Counties League, while Blackpool Wren Rovers F.C. play in the West Lancashire League. It is also home to the training ground of the town's professional club, Blackpool F.C.
