= Blackpool railway station =

Blackpool railway station may refer to several railway stations:

- Blackpool, England:
- Blackpool North railway station, the terminus of the main Blackpool branch line from Preston
- Blackpool Central railway station (closed in 1964)
- Blackpool South railway station, the terminus of the South Fylde Line from Kirkham and Wesham
- Blackpool Pleasure Beach railway station, the penultimate station before Blackpool South on the Blackpool South to Colne line
- Blackpool, Ireland
  - Blackpool (Cork) railway station, a proposed new station in Cork, Ireland
