= Public transport in the Fylde =

Towns and villages on the Fylde are denoted with red pins

Public transport in the Fylde is available for three modes of transport—bus, rail and tram—assisting residents of and visitors to the Fylde, a coastal plain in western Lancashire, England, to travel around much of the area's 64 square miles (170 km^{2}).

As of 2026, forty-five bus or coach services in the Fylde are provided by six operators, the largest being Blackpool Transport, which also operates the Blackpool tram network. With Blackpool being the main public transport hub, most of Blackpool Transport's fifteen bus routes have stops in the town. Services with the most frequency include three of the four "5s" (the 5, 5A and 5B), which serve Blackpool Victoria Hospital; the 5C, meanwhile, travels to Knott End-on-Sea via Poulton-le-Fylde. Coastal routes include the Resort Rider 1 (Fleetwood to St Annes), the Cleveleys Connection 7 (Cleveleys to Blackpool) and the Lytham Lines 11 (Lytham to Blackpool).

Archway Travel, which runs fourteen routes, and Transpora North West (eleven routes), replaced Nuttall's Coaches in 2007. Some of their routes serve the Fylde's numerous schools. One of Transpora's most popular regular services is the 24, which runs between Cleveleys and Blackpool town centre via Thornton and Poulton-le-Fylde.

Stagecoach Cumbria and North Lancashire operates one route out of Blackpool: the 42 (to Lancaster via Garstang). Its route 88 runs between Knott End and Lancaster, while the 89 adds Garstang to the route. Stagecoach Merseyside and South Lancashire runs the Preston-bound 61 and 68. Scottish Citylink provides a season coach service between Glasgow and Blackpool twice a week and twice both days.

The Fylde is home to eleven railway stations, each of which is on one of the two Blackpool branch lines. The two train operators are Avanti West Coast and Northern Trains.

Although Blackpool, the most populous settlement in the Fylde, has an airport, Blackpool Airport, it is no longer used for commercial flights.

In 2024, Lancashire County Council unveiled an "Any Bus" smart card scheme, enabling travellers to transfer between buses—regardless of the company operating them—and Blackpool trams. Initials plans were to roll out the initiative in phases, with the aim of cover the whole of the Lancashire by 2029, but the Fylde coast will be the first area to benefit from the full scheme. No date has yet been announced for its introduction.

== Bus ==
=== Distribution ===
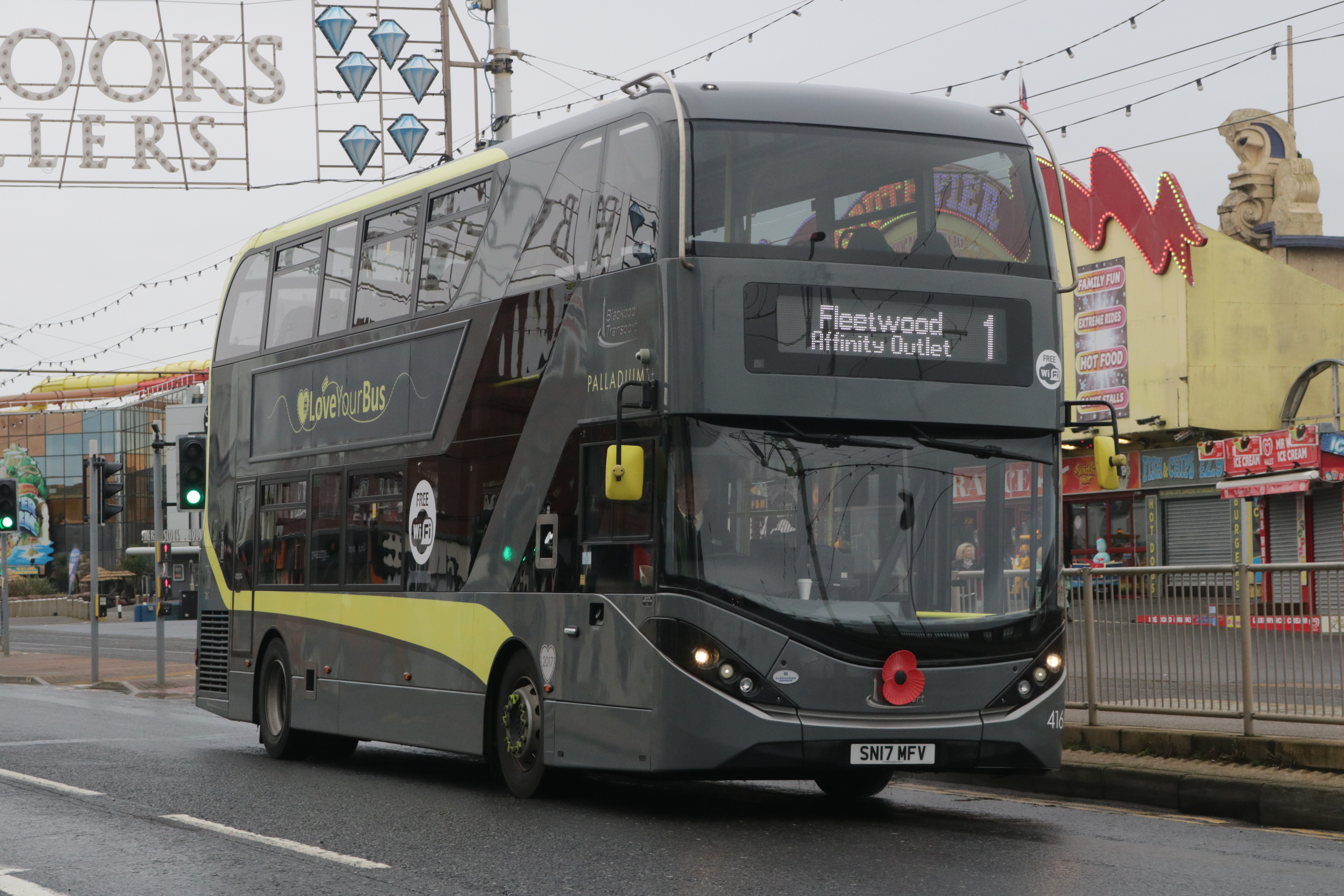
A Blackpool Transport bus running the route 1 service on Blackpool Promenade in 2019

Six bus operators serve the Fylde: Archway Travel, Blackpool Transport, Preston Bus, Stagecoach Cumbria and Lancashire, Stagecoach Merseyside and South Lancashire and Transpora North West.

Twenty bus routes either begin, end or pass through Blackpool: Blackpool Transport's routes 1, 3, 5, 5A, 5B, 5C, 6, 7, 8, 10, 11, 14, 18 and 5X; Stagecoach Cumbria and North Lancashire route 42; Stagecoach Merseyside and South Lancashire routes 61 and 68; Archway Travel's route 76; Transpora North West's routes 21 and 24; and National Express.

Cleveleys is served by eight routes: Blackpool Transport's 1, 3, 7 and 8; Transpora's route 21 and 24; and Archway Travel's route 74 and 75.

Poulton-le-Fylde is served by seven routes: Blackpool Transport's routes 5 and 5C; Transpora's route 24; Archway Travel's routes 74, 75 and 76; and Stagecoach North Lancashire and Cumbria's 42 to Blackpool or Lancaster via Garstang.

Lytham and/or St Annes-on-the-Sea is served by seven routes: Blackpool Transport's 7, 10 and 11; Archway Travel's 76 and 78; Transpora's route 21; and Stagecoach South Lancashire and Merseyside's 68 to Preston or Blackpool.

Fleetwood is served by five routes: Blackpool Transport's 1, 5 and 14, and Archway Travel's routes 74 and 75 to Preston.

Kirkham is also served by five routes: Archway Travel's routes 74, 75, 76 and 78, and Stagecoach South Lancashire and Merseyside's route 61 to Blackpool or Preston.

Thornton is also served by four routes: Blackpool Transport's 5C and 14, and Archway Travel's routes 74 and 75.

=== Blackpool Transport ===
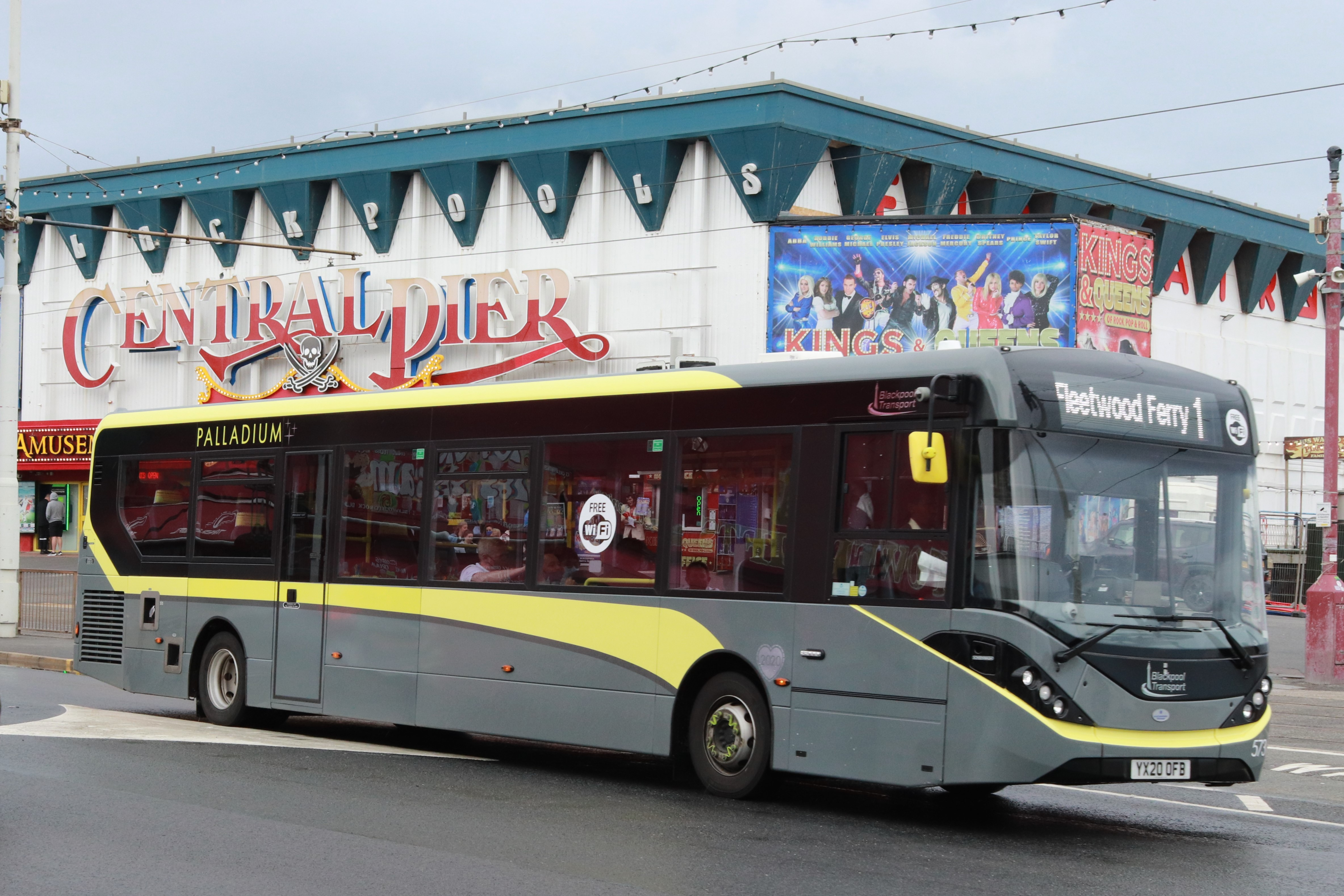
A Blackpool Transport Enviro 200mmc running route 1 in June 2021

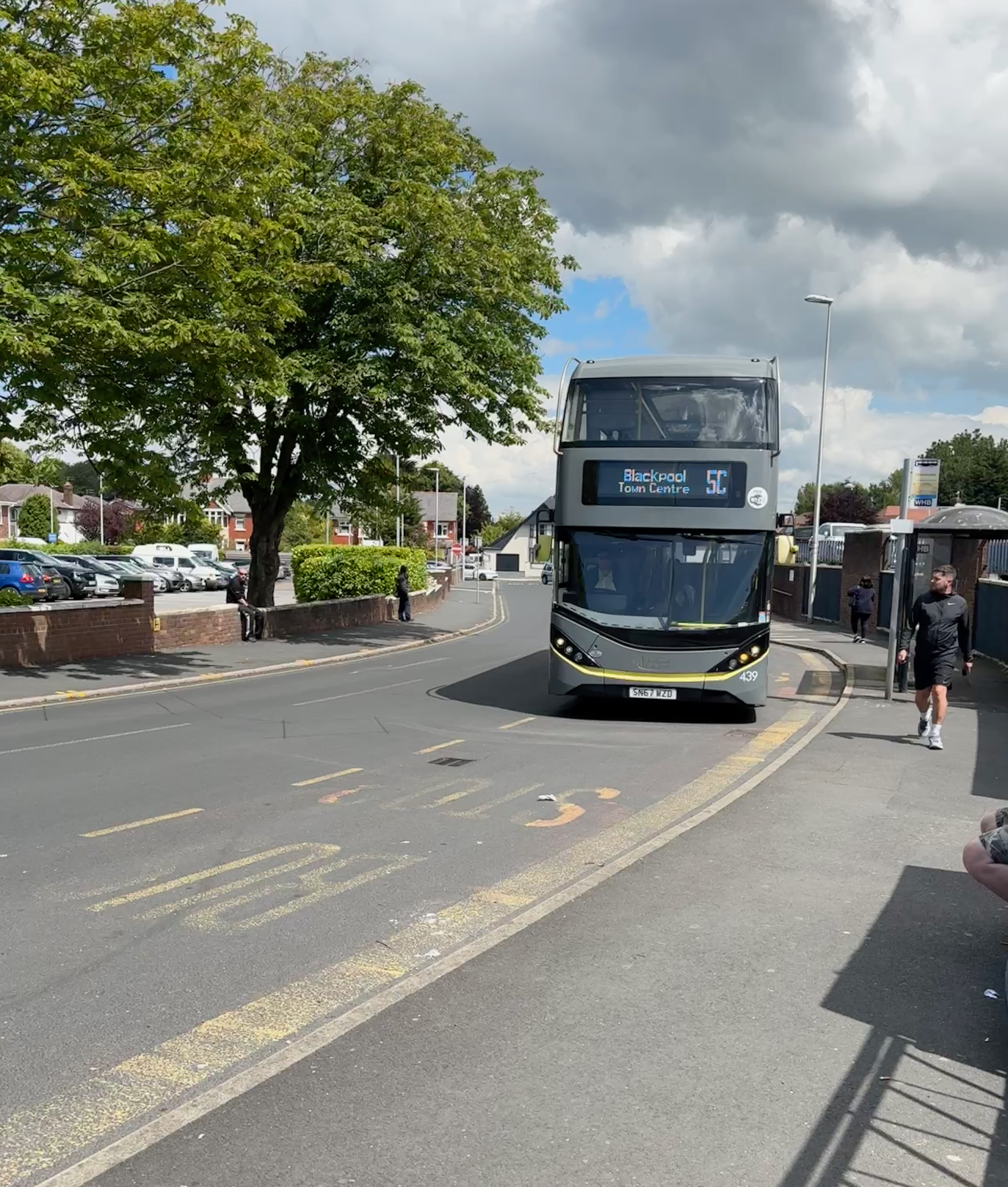
Route 5C at Blackpool Victoria Hospital in 2024

Established in 1885 and owned by Blackpool Council, Blackpool Transport serves Lytham, St Annes-on-the-Sea, Blackpool, Bispham, Thornton, Fleetwood, Cleveleys, Poulton-le-Fylde and Knott-End-on-Sea. Its main bus interchange is the Blackpool Bus Hub, on Market Street and Corporation Street in Blackpool town centre, which replaced Blackpool bus station.

There are fifteen routes in operation.

Route	Frequency	Origin and destination
Resort Rider 1	30 mins	Fleetwood to St Annes
Cross Town 3	30 mins	Mereside Tesco to Cleveleys Crescent via Blackpool
Route 4	60 mins	Norbreck to Cleveleys
Victoria Lines 5	30 mins	Halfway House to Affinity Lancashire via Blackpool and Victoria Hospital
Victoria Lines 5A	60 mins	Blackpool to Staining via Layton and Victoria Hospital
Victoria Lines 5B	60 mins	Blackpool to Blackpool Zoo via Victoria Hospital
Victoria Lines 5C	30 mins	Blackpool to Knott End-on-Sea via Victoria Hospital and Poulton-le-Fylde
Cross Town 6	20 mins	Mereside to Grange Park via Blackpool
Cleveleys Connection 7	30 mins	Cleveleys to Lytham via Blackpool
Cleveleys Connection 8	30 mins	Cleveleys to Blackpool via Bispham
Lytham Lines 10	30 mins	Blackpool to Lytham via Common Edge and St Annes
Lytham Lines 11	20 mins	Lytham to Blackpool town centre via St Annes
Wyre Line 14	20 mins	Fleetwood to Blackpool via Layton
Local Link 18	60 mins	Blackpool to Poulton via Mereside Tesco via South Shore
5X	Once each weekday	Blackpool to Poulton

In November 2023, Blackpool Transport announced merges of and additions to existing routes. A Route 1A will run seasonally between Cleveleys and St Annes. Route 3A will run between Cleveleys Park and Mereside, having previously been part of route 3. Route 5 gained the most changes: the base route was extended to Poulton-le-Fylde (formerly part of route 2). Route 5A will run from South Shore to Staining, initially following the base route, then taking the former route 15 to Staining. Route 5B adds a stop at Blackpool Zoo. Route 5C is a "reimagined" 2C from Blackpool to Knott End with increased frequency. Route 6 was extended from Grange Park to the Department of War Pensions office at Peel Park, with hourly extensions to Whitehills Business Park. Route 7 dropped the leg to Lytham, which will now be part of the 11A. Route 7A is a revamped route 9 which runs between Cleveleys and Blackpool via Bispham and Layton. Route 11A continues from Starr Gate to Lytham. Route 17 (Blackpool to Lytham via Common Edge) was rebranded as Route 11B. Route 18 will continue to run hourly, while the changes to the other routes have resulted in shorter connection times (between 9 and 20 minutes for most routes).

In April 2025, they announced the introduction of a new route 2 and combined the route 1 with the route 2 for a combined "Resort Rider" brand. The new route 2 runs from Fleetwood's Cala Gran Holiday Park to Blackpool Zoo every 60 minutes. With this, the 1A, which extended the 1 to St Annes Square during the season, was discontinued. Four months later, Blackpool Transport adjusted its timetables, including the extension of route 5 to include Thornton and Cleveleys, as well as amending routes to accommodate Blackpool and the Fylde College's campus in Bispham.

=== Stagecoach Cumbria and North Lancashire ===
Begun in 2011, Stagecoach Cumbria and North Lancashire runs three routes in the Fylde:

Route	Frequency	Origin and destination
42	60 mins	Blackpool to Lancaster via Garstang
88	120 mins	Knott-End to Lancaster via Garstang
89	120 mins	Knott-End to Lancaster

=== Stagecoach Merseyside and South Lancashire ===
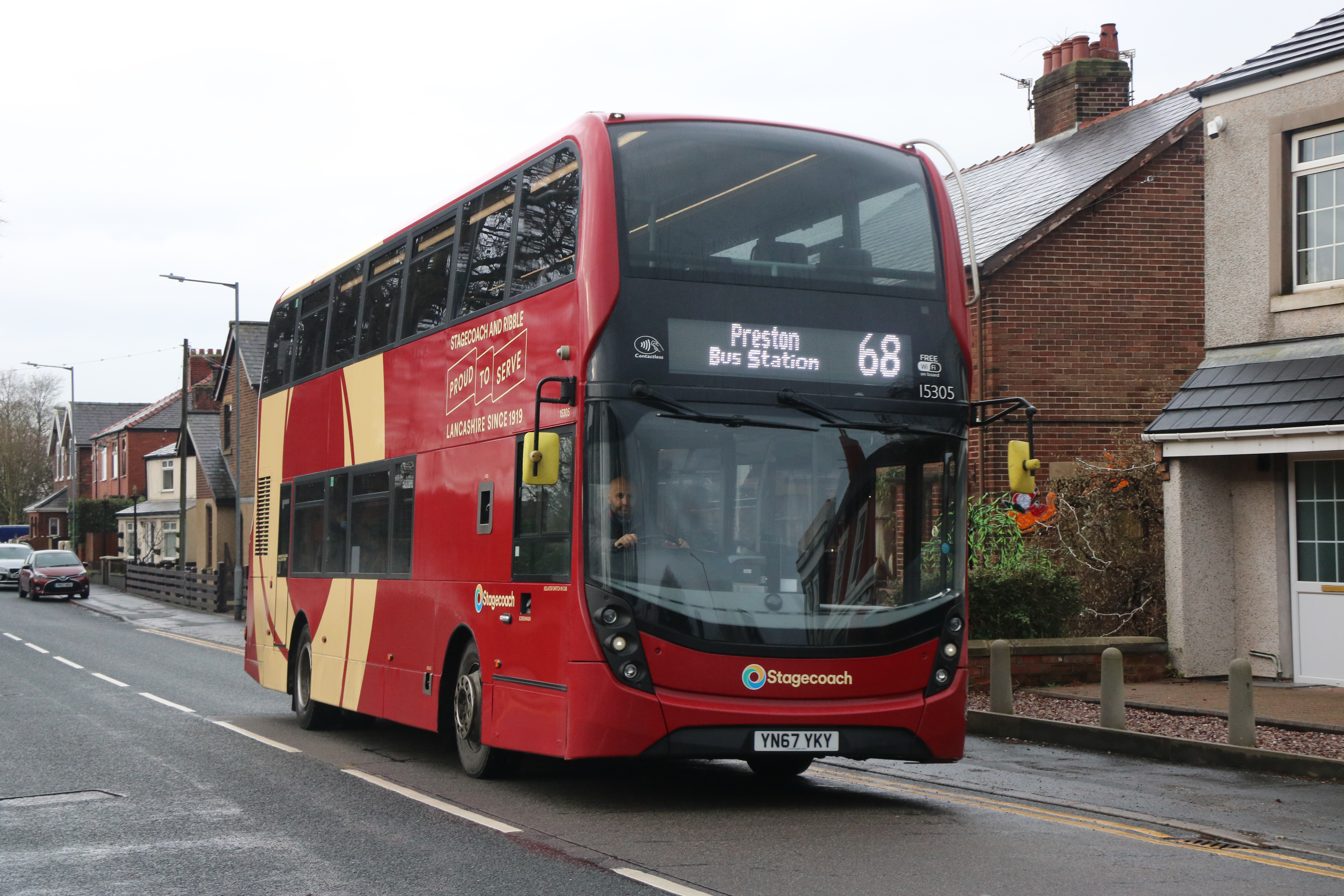
Stagecoach Merseyside and South Lancashire's route 68, en route to Preston bus station in 2021

Operates two regional bus and coach services in and out of Blackpool:

Route	Frequency	Origin and destination
61	30 mins	Preston to Blackpool via Wrea Green
68	20 mins	Preston to Blackpool via Warton and Freckleton

=== Transpora North West ===
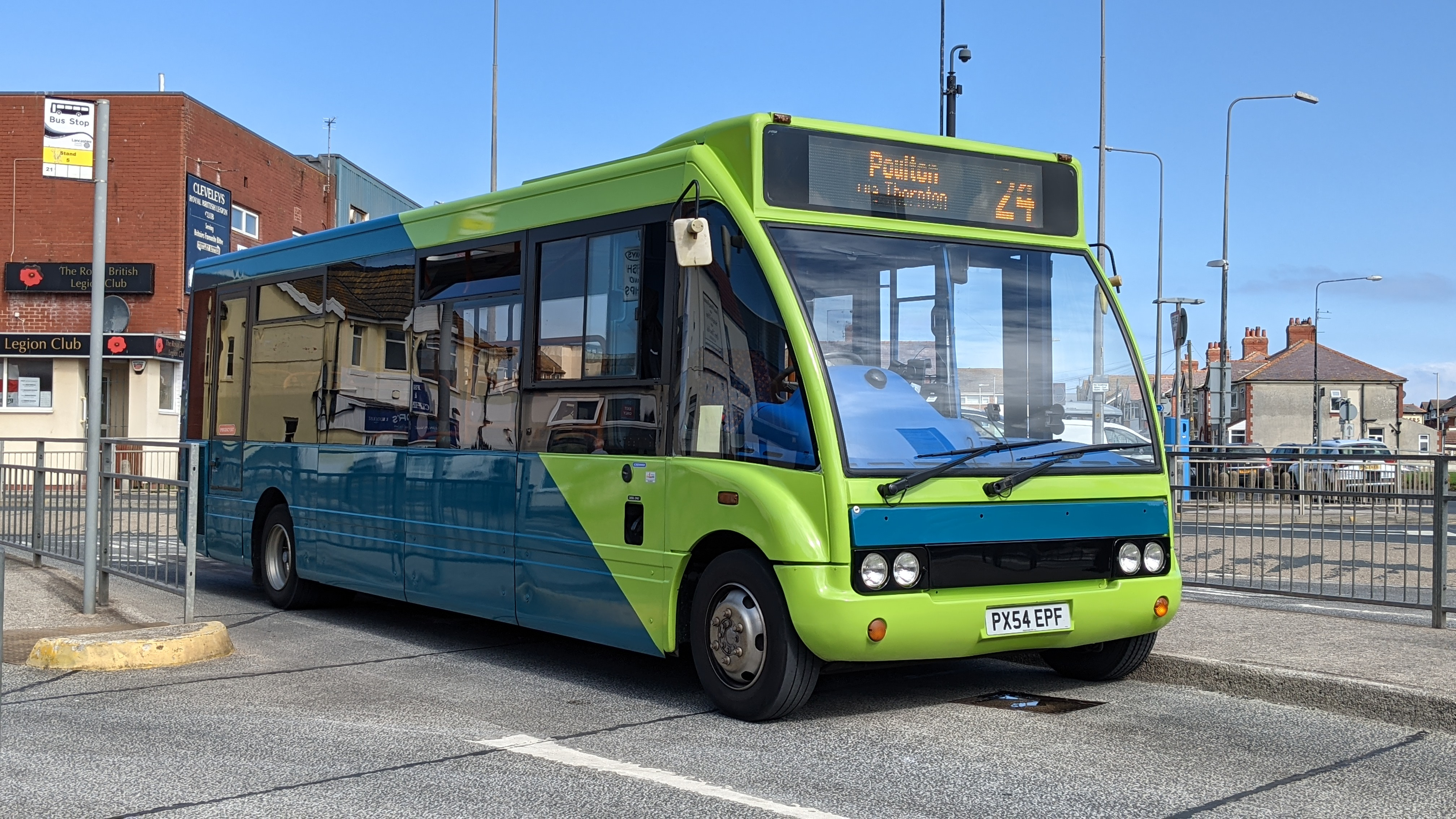
Transpora's route 24 at Cleveleys bus station, en route to Poulton-le-Fylde (via Thornton) in 2021

A rebirth of Nuttall's Coaches and established in 2007, Transpora serves Blackpool, St Annes, Cleveleys, Thornton and Fleetwood.

Eleven routes exist:

Route	Origin and destination
21	St Annes to Cleveleys
22	Blackpool Tower to Blackpool Zoo
24	Cleveleys to Blackpool town centre via Poulton-le-Fylde
26	Marton Mere circular
523	Carleton to Saint Aidan's, Preesall
524	Fleetwood West View to Saint Aidan's, Preesall
568	Cleveleys to Millfield, Thornton
594	Weeton to Staining via Hodgson Academy, Poulton-le-Fylde
648	Fleetwood to Poulton-le-Fylde schools
660	Cleveleys to Hodgson Academy, Poulton-le-Fylde
916	St Annes Queen's Manor to St Bede's, Lytham

=== Archway Travel ===
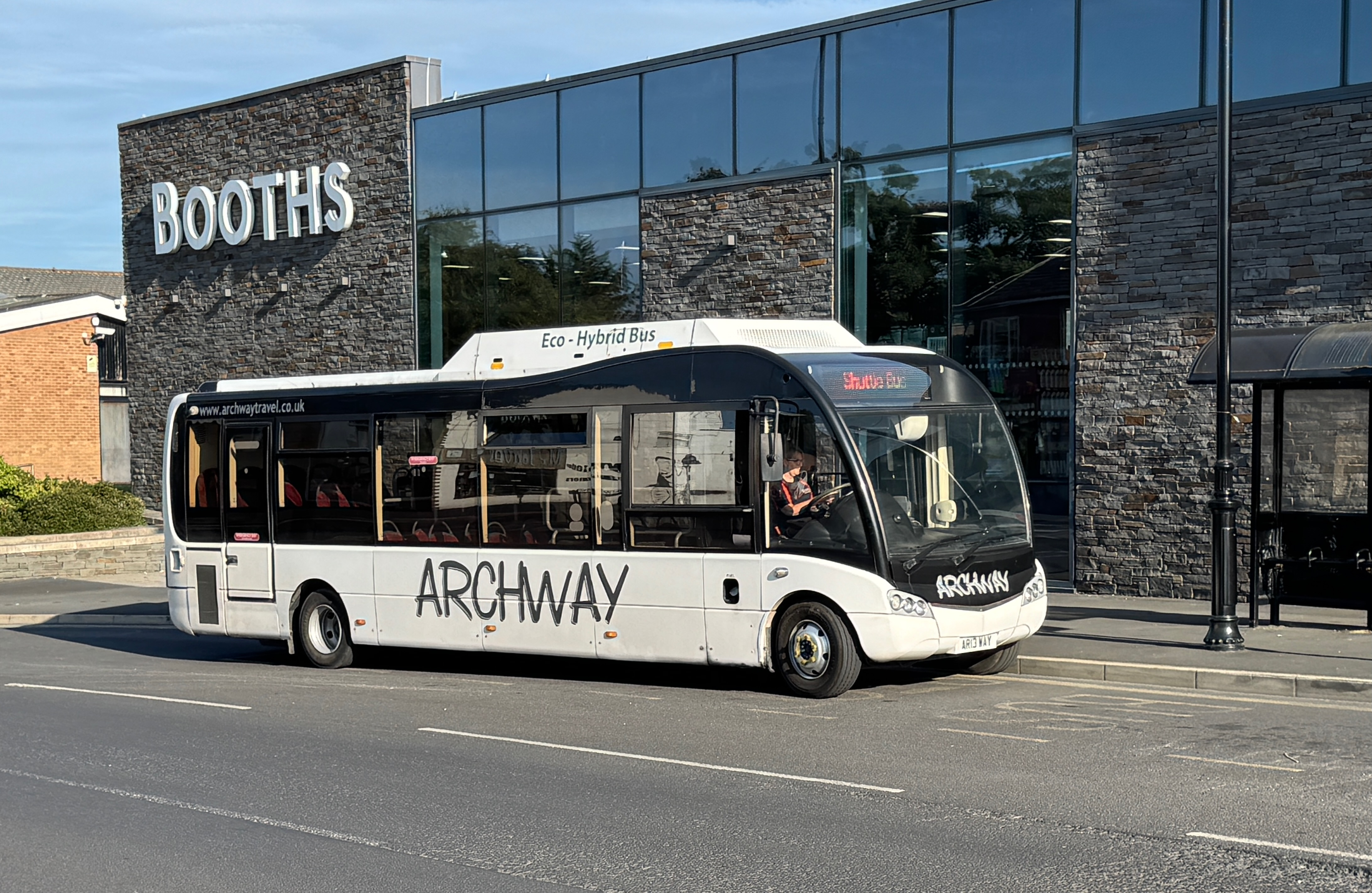
An Archway Travel coach in Poulton-le-Fylde (2024)

Fourteen routes in operation:

Route	Origin and destination
74	Fleetwood to Preston via Thornton, Poulton-le-Fylde, Great Eccleston, Elswick, Kirkham, Inskip, Catforth and Lea
75	Fleetwood to Preston via Thornton, Cleveleys, Poulton-le-Fylde, Staining, Weeton, Kirkham and Newton with Scales
76	Blackpool to St Annes via Poulton-le-Fylde, Weeton, Kirkham, Wrea Green, Warton and Lytham
78	Great Eccleston to St Annes via Elswick, Kirkham, Freckleton, Warton, Lytham and Ansdell
525	Rossall Point to Saint Aidan's Church of England High School in Preesall
526	Larkholme Parade, Fleetwood to Saint Aidan's
527	Ship Inn in Elswick and Saint Aidan's via Great Eccleston
541	Pilling to Hodgson High School and Baines High School, Poulton
552	Derby Arms, Inskip, to Bowgreave via Elswick, Great Eccleston, St Michael's on Wyre and Churchtown
567	Knott End to Lancaster schools
607	Thistleton to Baines High School via Elswick, Great Eccleston, Little Singleton, Singleton and Little Poulton
675	Elswick to Broughton
813	Hambleton to Garstang Academy
SF1	Lytham to Blackpool Sixth Form College via Freckleton, Warton, Wrea Green, Kirkham, Greenhalgh-with-Thistleton, Elswick and Great Eccleston

National Express coaches serve Blackpool's Central Coach Station.

== Rail ==
The Fylde has eleven railway stations. Each is on one of the two Blackpool branch lines, while those between Kirkham and Wesham and Blackpool North are also on the Calder Valley Line, which continues on towards Preston. The two train operators are Avanti West Coast and Northern Trains.

Northern operate an hourly service to York and Liverpool Lime Street via Wigan from Blackpool North, and a service to Manchester Airport every thirty minutes. From Blackpool South, Northern operate an hourly service to Preston.

Avanti West Coast operate one train a day to Euston, leaving Blackpool North at 5:35am (weekdays only).

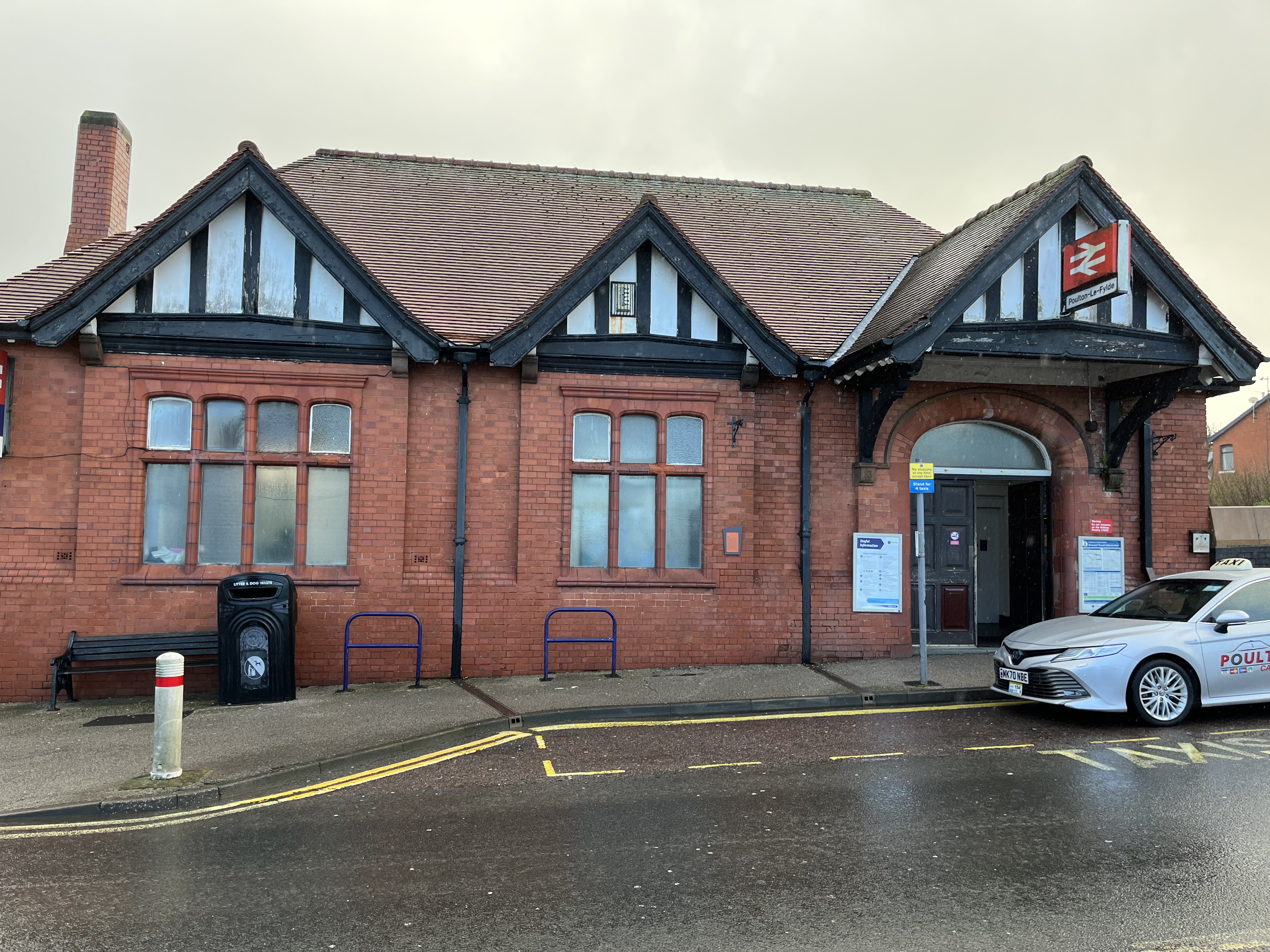
Poulton-le-Fylde's Victorian-era railway station

From west to east:

- Ansdell and Fairhaven
- Blackpool North
- Blackpool South
- Blackpool Pleasure Beach
- Kirkham and Wesham
- Layton
- Lytham
- Moss Side
- Poulton-le-Fylde
- Squires Gate
- St Annes-on-the-Sea

== Tram ==
An eleven-mile (eighteen-kilometre) dual stretch of tramways run between Starr Gate, in Blackpool's South Shore, and Fleetwood. Blackpool Tramway, operated by Blackpool Transport, was established in 1885. It carried 4.9 million passengers in 2022–23.

== Funding ==
In April 2025, over £4m of funding was to be spent on improving bus services in Blackpool, including upgrading shelters. It was part of the town's Bus Service Improvement Plan, which sets out a number of priorities, including bus lanes on Talbot Road, replacing worn out bus shelters and general cleaning. It also includes rolling out more Real Time Information screens at town-centre bus shelters.

The funding included £2.5m of capital and almost £1.7m of revenue funding allocated to the council by the Department for Transport.

== See also ==
- Poulton & Wyre Railway Society
