= Irene Royse =

British athlete (1921–2018)

Irene Royse (née Stretton)
Personal information
- Born: 27 September 1921 Aston, Birmingham, England
- Died: 12 November 2018 (aged 97) Leeds, England

Sport
- Sport: Athletics
- Event: sprints
- Club: Bolton United Harriers & AC
Medal record
Representing England
WAAA Championships
Gold medal – first place	1946 White City	60 metres
Gold medal – first place	1947 Polytechnic	60 metres

Irene Olive Mary Royse (née Stretton) (27 September 1921 – 12 November 2018) was a British athlete, who specialised in the sprint disciplines and was selected for the 1948 Summer Olympics and was two-times British champion.

== Career ==
Stretton born in Aston, Birmingham, first came to prominence in 1937 after winning the National Schools championship over 100 yards, where she represented Palatine School of Blackpool. She joined the Bolton United Harriers and Athletic Club and won the 1939 Northern Counties Women's Amateur Athletic Association Championship.

Stretton married in 1941 and became Irene Royse and won two consecutive 60 metres titles at the prestigious WAAA Championships.

Royse placed on the podium in both the 100 metres and 200 metres at the 1945 WAAA Championships. The following year she won her first AAA title at the 1946 WAAA Championships over the 60 metres.

After representing Britain in the Women's European Championship meeting at Strasbourg in 1947, she successfully retained her 60 metres title at the 1947 WAAA Championships.

Royse was selected for the British team for the 1948 Olympic Games but failed to make an appearance in the sprint events at the London Games.
