= SQU =

SQU or squ may refer to:

- Sultan Qaboos University, a public university in Muscat, Oman
- SQU, the National Rail station code for Squires Gate railway station, Lancashire, England
- squ, the ISO 639-3 code for Squamish language, Canada
