= South Shore, Blackpool =

Area of Blackpool, England

Coordinates: 53.789°N 3.043°W

South Shore
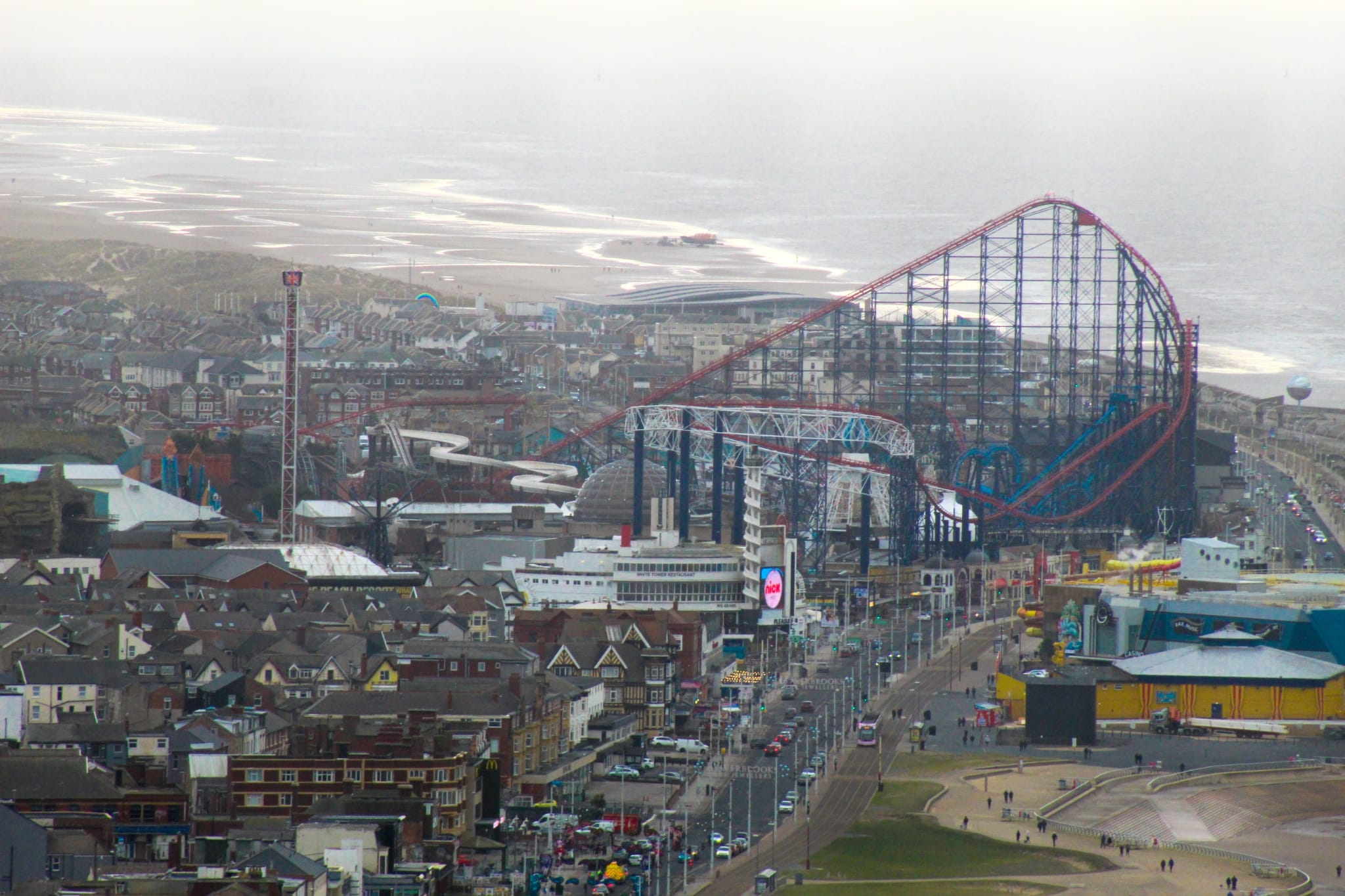
- Blackpool Pleasure Beach in South Shore from Blackpool Tower

- Location in Blackpool Location within Lancashire
- Unitary authority: Blackpool
- Ceremonial county: Lancashire
- Region: North West
- Country: England
- Sovereign state: United Kingdom
- Post town: BLACKPOOL
- Postcode district: FY1, FY4
- Dialling code: 01253
- Police: Lancashire
- Fire: Lancashire
- Ambulance: North West
- UK Parliament: Blackpool South

South Shore is an area of Blackpool, Lancashire, England. It forms the southern part of the town for two miles along the Promenade from Rigby Road to Starr Gate. Its inland boundaries run along Rigby Road, Queen Victoria Road, Ansdell Road, Hawes Side Lane, Common Edge Road and Squires Gate Lane.

== History ==
=== Layton Hawes ===
The area now classed as South Shore in Blackpool is the result of many changes over more than 250 years. The land was originally owned by the Manor of Layton and was a detached, extensive tract of common wasteland containing about 1,800 acres known as Layton Hawes, common to the parishes of Bispham and Poulton. At that time there was no parish church in Blackpool.

Existing freehold land owners in the local townships, villages and hamlets of Great Layton, Little Layton, Warbreck, Great Marton, Little Marton, Great Bispham and Blackpool had exclusive rights of common on the Hawes, as granted by the Lord of the Manor. Their tenants would also have had rights of common, such as grazing their livestock, collecting reeds for thatching and cutting turf for fuel.

Due to its proximity to the coast, large areas of sand dunes had long-since formed on the coastal stretch of Layton Hawes. The rest was unstructured, largely uncultivated and contained large areas of moss lands. As late as 1837, it was described by the Reverend William Thornber as an 'unproductive sandy surface', in which crops have 'in the sea blast, a destroying enemy'.

In 1767 the land owners in the local townships presented a petition to Parliament asking for permission to enclose the whole of the common. Parliament agreed and passed an Act of Enclosure, appointing six commissioners, who swore their oaths at the house of John Forshaw in Blackpool on 25 May 1767. After two years' work the commissioners signed the Enclosure Award on 1 April 1769, entitled: An Act for Dividing and Inclosing the Common, Waste Grounds, and Sand Hills, called Layton Hawes, within the Manor of Layton in the parishes of Poulton and Bispham in the County Palatine of Lancaster.

The local freeholders were each allocated land, roughly in proportion to their existing local land holdings. As Lord of the Manor, Fleetwood Hesketh was allotted one eighteenth of the whole of Layton Hawes – 298 acres. The largest land owner was Thomas Clifton esq. of Lytham Hall who was allotted 649 acres.

The Act specified that roads were to be laid out and drainage ditches were to be dug. The road names were given as follows, with their modern counterpart in brackets

- Moss Lane (Common Edge Road/Hawes Side Lane/Ansdell Road)
- Sunday Leach Lane (St Annes Road)
- No name given but later known as Roughs Lane (Abbey Road)
- Broad Lane (Lytham Road)
- Lytham Lane (Division Lane - originally from the SE corner of the common and westwards to the sea)
- Little Marton Lane (Squires Gate Lane)
- Milkers Gate Lane (Highfield Road & Harrowside)
- Daggers Hole Lane (Watson Road)
- Cow Gap Lane (Waterloo Road)
- Spen Green Lane (Bloomfield Road)
- No name given but a lane leading northwards from Spen Green Lane to ancient, enclosed lands belonging to Fleetwood Hesketh, known as Revoe Tenement (eventually Queen Victoria Road and part of Central Drive to Rigby Road)

The Hawes was split into four distinct areas representing the main townships of the freeholders – Layton with Warbreck, Bispham, Great Marton and Little Marton.

=== Early development ===
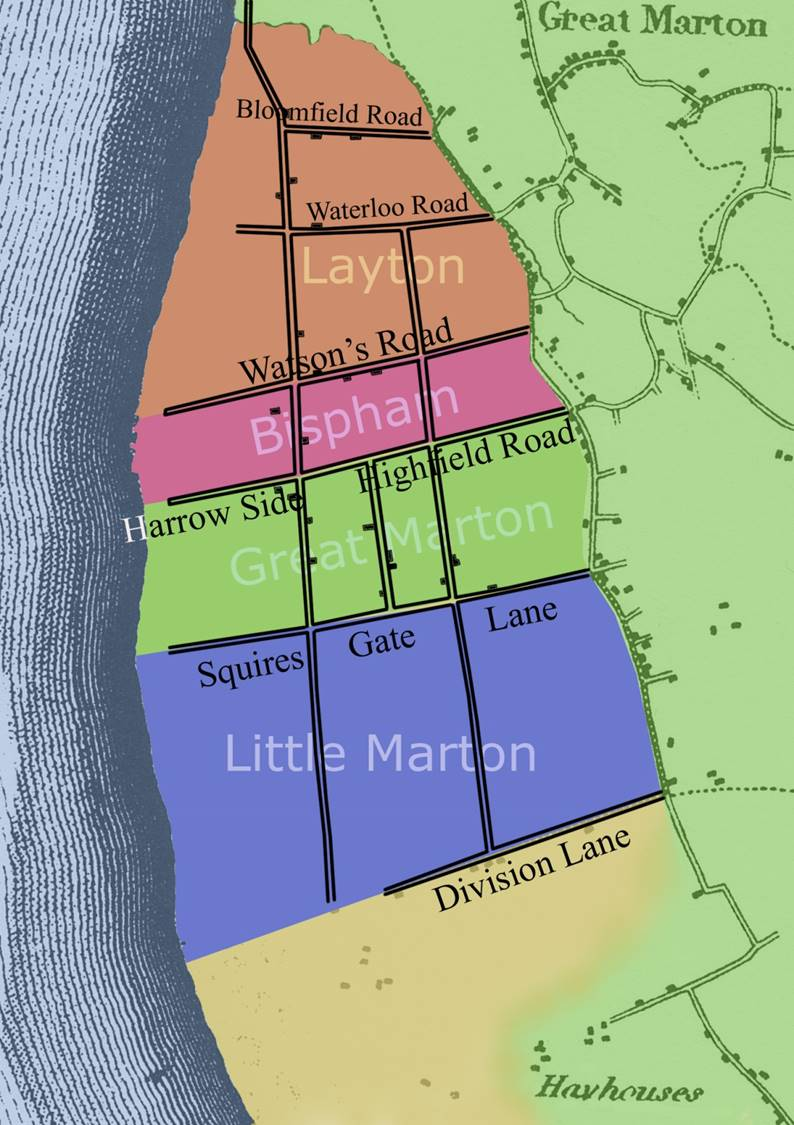
1818 Greenwood map overlaid with 1769 Enclosure map, prepared by Ted Lightbown

A direct result of these enclosures was the later development of South Shore which today retains an almost identical layout to that in the 1769 Award. Land which was better suited for building began to increase in value and by 1819 the first house was built on the foreshore near the corner of Waterloo Road, soon to be followed by several more. As nearby Blackpool was already a burgeoning resort, some of these cottages in the tiny South Shore hamlet began to advertise for the reception of visitors.

Thomas Moore, owner of Great Marton Windmill and a large landowner, was the man responsible for building the first houses and the founder of South Shore. He ignored the criticisms of others who said he was on a "wild goose chase".

His first house was named Tower Cottage, on the corner of what became known as Albert Terrace, named after a watchtower standing opposite (this appears on a print in 1855 but was not evident on James Mudd's panorama of 1866 held by Blackpool Library). It was eventually numbered 447 Promenade and survived until 1938 when it was demolished.

During Thomas Moore's lifetime, South Shore was to develop into the pretty hamlet described by Thornber in 1837. Moore gifted land and was a driving force behind the erection of South Shore Parish Church (Holy Trinity), Trinity School and a graveyard. He died on 18 March 1837, just prior to the consecration of the church, after stepping on a nail and contracting blood poisoning.

=== Tithe surveys ===
Between 1838 and 1848, the four areas of the Hawes were assessed for the Tithe Survey. This detailed the names of land owners, occupiers, land use and rentcharge. The Layton with Warbreck Tithe maps and land apportionments show the development of South Shore in its first 20 years. Of its 50 properties, approximately 20 houses were on the Promenade between present day Dean Street and Shaw Road. A few were on Waterloo Road, Bolton Street and at the north end of Lytham Road. A handful of properties and farms were scattered in outlying areas of the common. There were four drinking establishments, two shops and one bowling green. Marton and Bispham Hawes were assessed separately and show no developed areas, with the majority being isolated farms. The Halfway House was already established as a public house.

=== Later development ===
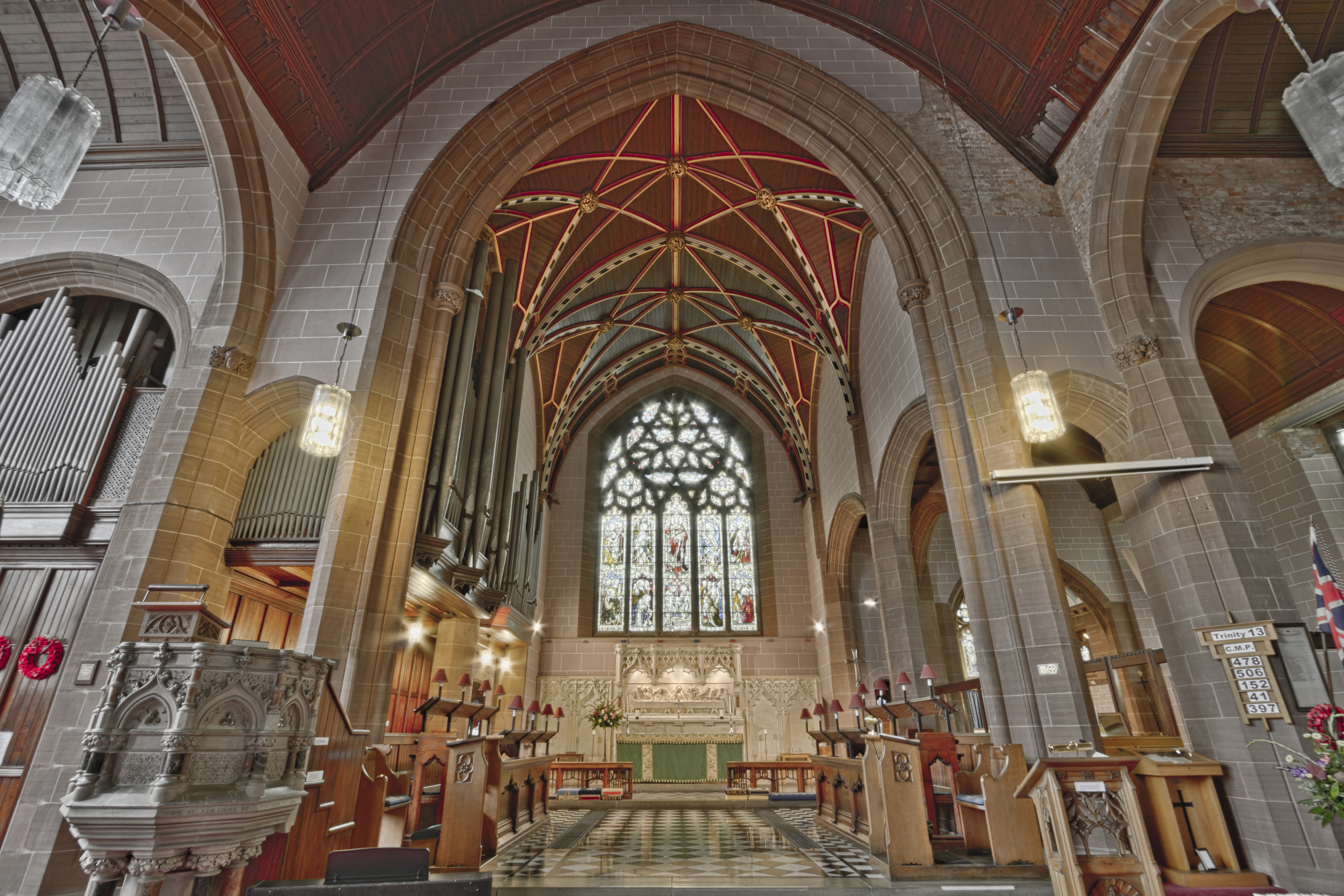
Inside Holy Trinity, South Shore's Parish Church which opened in 1837

The 1841 Census gave no road names and listed 313 people in the South Shore district of Layton with Warbreck. By 1851 the population was 468 and several houses were classed as uninhabited. Some of the roads were named and those on the foreshore have the address as 'Beach'. Several Layton with Warbreck properties which were not in the village were listed under 'Common' or 'Hawes'.

Development was slow in South Shore and even slower on the Hawes but the arrival of the Blackpool and Lytham railway in April 1863, and improving railway links further afield, increased mobility for commuters and encouraged greater visitor numbers. This then contributed to an increase in private and commercial properties. OS maps were only published in 1844 and 1893 but an 1870 Bartholomew map shows that the village of South Shore included a few new roads – Station Road, Moore Street, Queen Street (now Montague Street), Bath Street, Rawcliffe Street, Alexandra Street (now Road), Gold Street (later Albert Street, now Haig Road), Church Street (Bond Street) and Dean Street. Marked development can be seen on Church Street and Bolton Street, in addition to a few rows of terraces on Gold Street. The foreshore now had a large number of neat rows of houses on several terraces as far as present-day St Chad's Road. At the northern end of the foreshore was the Manchester Hotel and another terrace of hotels. The first lifeboat station had opened behind these on Lytham Road in 1864 and a handful of other properties were springing up on Lytham Road between Alexandra Road and Waterloo Road.

In 1871 South Shore was recorded as consisting of 2,150 acres with a population of 1,886. In the same year, South Shore Parish was constituted as a separate ecclesiastical district so was no longer part of the parishes of Bispham and Poulton. The new parish boundary also covered part of Marton Moss.

By 1873, Harding's map shows three pairs of larger houses between Waterloo Road and South Shore Station, built in 1871. One of these pairs was numbered in the 1891 Census as 274/6 Lytham Road and was then the location of South Shore High School. Owned by Robert Kenyon, the High School would eventually become part of Arnold School. Nearby existing properties today show the much larger, grander designs which would become synonymous with many of the houses built on Lytham Road, as far south as Squires Gate Lane. After demolition, the high school plot became Lytham Road Health Centre which opened in February 1978 but was later demolished as Blackpool's health service provision increased – it is now a car park.

Further South on Lytham Road, several large properties had been built by 1880 and numerous land sales encouraged further building and development – Stony Hill Villa was in existence by the beginning of 1857, Leighton House (now 504 Lytham Road) was also built in the early 1850s and was owned by Robert Rawcliffe, Westover House and Arnold Villa (now forming part of Armfield Academy) were commissioned in 1866, Crown Villas were built in 1878 (date stone on property).

Education for local children was initially on a voluntary basis and only available for younger children at Trinity School which began in 1839 in a tiny, wooden building next to the church. In 1841 there were over 50 children enrolled. In 1846 another property was erected on the corner of Dean Street and Lytham Road and was in use as schoolrooms for older pupils, with accommodation for a teacher (now the site of a garage). At this time it was under the auspices of St John's School in Blackpool but in 1858 Alexander Doleman came from Musselburgh to be head of what were now called the South Shore National Schools. These schools continued around the Dean Street area until the population was booming and they were no longer fit for purpose. This coincided with the progressive plans of the recently created Blackpool School Board in 1899. On 27 April 1903, South Shore Board School opened with 873 pupils at Thames Road – now Thames Primary Academy.

Roman Catholic pupils in South Shore were only accommodated from 15 August 1880 at St Cuthbert's RC Chapel and School on Lytham Road. In June 1890 the new Pugin designed church opened adjacent to it. The school eventually accommodated infant pupils only and served as a feeder school for Our Lady of The Assumption on Common Edge Road which was formally opened on 1 November 1953. After a new St Cuthbert's RC Primary School opened in 1977 on Lightwood Avenue, the old school continued to be used as a thriving community centre until its demolition after 2004.

Private education increased in popularity in South Shore from at least the 1850s. Several existing properties were once private schools, such as the Queen's Hotel, built in 1852. In addition to being a hotel, it was also the home of the College Francais by 1856 later becoming home to the Merchant's College at the end of July 1869. Arnold School lays claim to being the last remaining independent school in South Shore, finally closing its doors in July 2013 after merging with King Edward and Queen Mary School's in Lytham to form AKS Lytham.

The Incorporation of Blackpool in 1876 saw a major restructure of the town. However, the new Borough of Blackpool did not incorporate any of Great Marton, Little Marton or Bispham Hawes. In 1879, a bill was passed for the extension and improvement of the borough which meant that most of Great Marton Hawes and Bispham Hawes were incorporated into Blackpool Borough. The only section of the Hawes to remain under Great Marton township was the square of land between St Anne's Road on the west and Common Edge Road on the east, Highfield Road on the north and Squires Gate Lane on the south. This area and Little Marton Hawes were not incorporated until the Marton and Blackpool amalgamation in 1934.

The 1879 extensions, along with the new parish boundaries, meant that residents in the village of South Shore and the Hawes were slowly integrating into a growing South Shore district of Blackpool. As more houses were built and visitor numbers increased, a greater number of purchasers or leaseholders came from inland regions. In the 1881 Census, of the eight inhabited houses on South Parade (between Waterloo Road and Britannia Place), six heads of households had been born outside of the local area, including one from Scotland.

In the 1891 Census, the related Hawes areas were still recorded as the hamlet or village, within the Borough of Blackpool, but this practice was obsolete by 1901. The 1891 OS survey shows that all the roads in the tourist areas of South Shore were laid although properties were yet to be built between Rigby Road and Clarendon Road. By 1909, to the east of the railway, Saville Road, St Helier's Road, Westbourne Road, Henry Street and Durley Road were all taking shape and, further south, new roads and properties were established between Watson Road and Highfield Road.

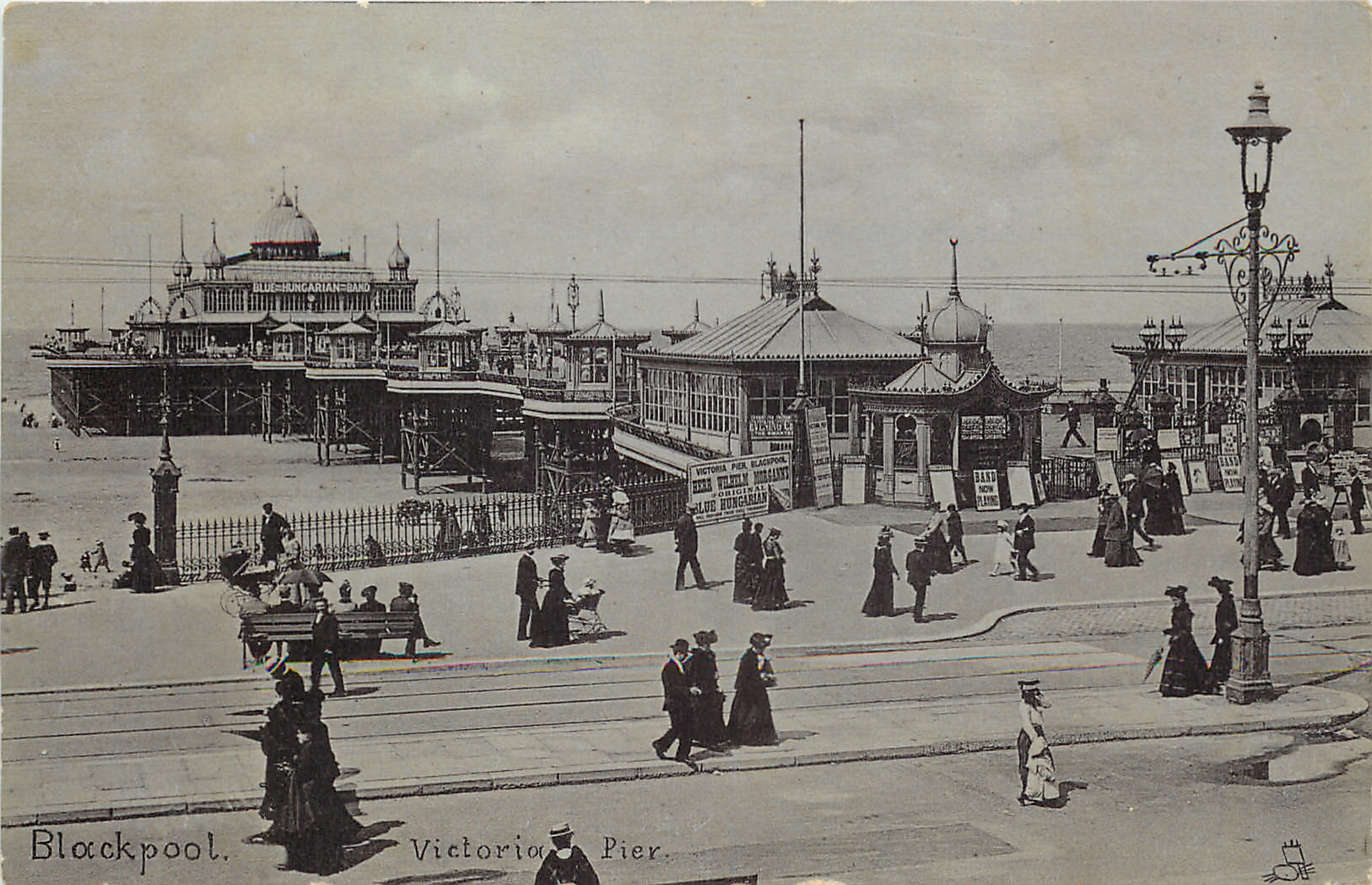
Victoria Pier (now South Pier) in 1904

The newer suburb of South Shore grew far more rapidly in the 20th century to accommodate the ever-growing population, as evidenced in census returns, directories and OS maps. New schools opened as residential estates developed, such as Roseacre in 1928, Highfield High School in 1933 and Hawes Side in 1937. The main shopping districts continued to be Waterloo Road, Bolton Street and Bond Street although the stretch of Lytham Road between South Shore Station and Manchester Square had also established itself by the end of the 19th century. Highfield Road then became a hub for local shopping in the first few decades of the 20th century as more residential areas developed.

A steady decline in high street shopping trends since the latter part of the 20th century has had a knock-on effect on the popularity and retail offers of the main shopping areas. Highfield Road continues to have some independent shops and has become a popular destination for several bars and eateries. Lytham Road, Bond Street and Waterloo Road continue to have a mixture of retail and commercial ventures but economic decline, decreasing footfall, a lack of investment and poor development management has contributed to a decline in their popularity. In 2023, parts of Waterloo Road and Bond Street were designated an Area of Special Local Character in order to protect future planning and development.

== Area of Special Local Character ==
In February 2023 Blackpool Council proposed that South Shore be recognised as an Area of Special Local Character, which Historic England describes as historically important. It pointed to a significant cluster of locally listed buildings on Waterloo Road and Bond Street as well as the Grade II listed Holy Trinity Church and some interesting original architectural features on the upper floors of other buildings.

The report stated said that "commercial pressures and poor development management in the past have resulted in the loss of historic shop fronts and architectural features." And that designation "would assist the decision-making process… where proposals would result in further erosion of historic character".

A public consultation on the designation met no objections.

Heritage assets which would be included in the new designated area are:

- Holy Trinity, Bond Street/Dean Street (Grade II)
- Holy Trinity School, Dean Street (adjacent to church)
- Harte's Store, 7-11 Bond Street (the former Woolworth's store on the corner with Waterloo Road has now fallen into dilapidation)
- Former bank, 29-31 Bond Street
- Former bank, 46 Bond Street
- Former assembly rooms, 98-100 Bond Street/Station Road
- Former villa and bank, 87 Bond Street/22 Dean Street
- Dutton Arms, Waterloo Road/441 Promenade
- Bull Inn, Waterloo Road
- Talbot Court, 5-9 Waterloo Road/Promenade
- Former Post Office, 20-32 Waterloo Road
- Former bank, 44 Waterloo Road/St Bedes Avenue

== Tourism ==
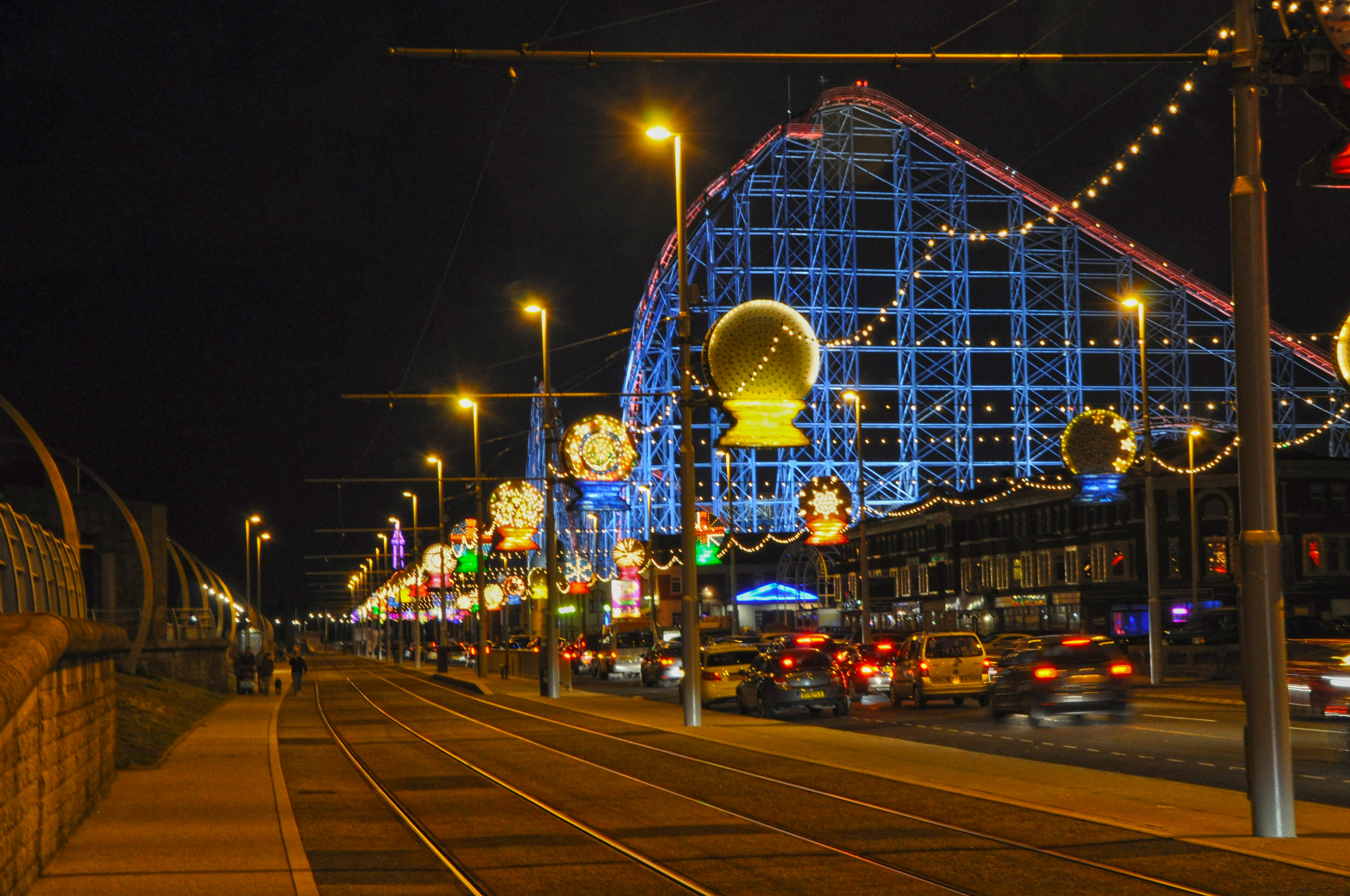
Blackpool Pleasure Beach and illuminations on South Promenade

Several major tourist attractions can be found in South Shore including Blackpool Pleasure Beach, which was founded in 1896 in an area populated by Romani Gypsies, including members of the Boswell family, one of England's largest and most important Gypsy families, who were subsequently evicted.

The area is also home to: South Pier, which opened as Victoria Pier at Easter 1893; the Sandcastle Waterpark, which sits on the site of the former Open Air Baths on South Promenade; and Ripley's Believe it or Not.

== Culture and leisure ==
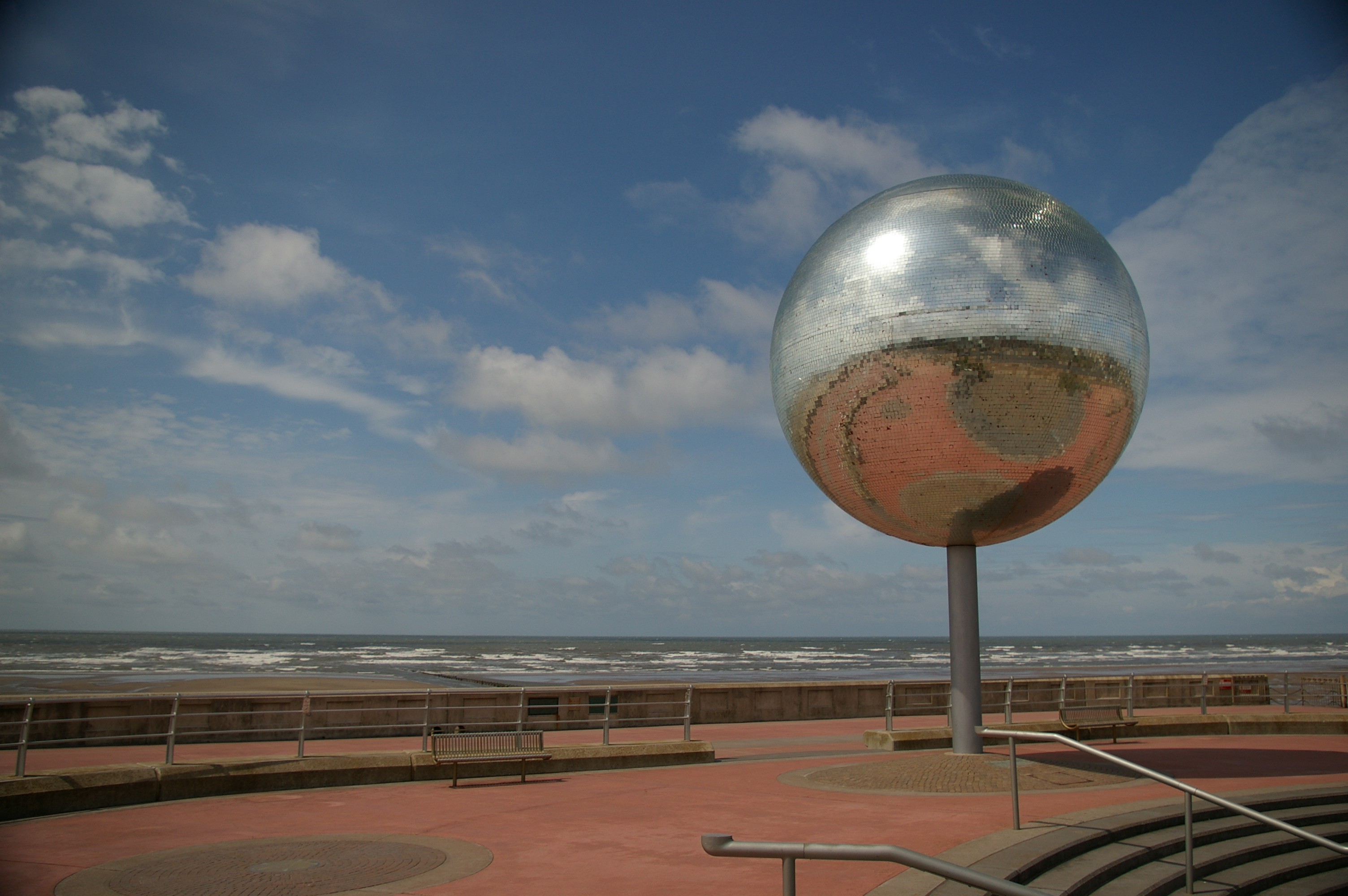
They Shoot Horses, Don't They is a mirrorball sculpture designed by Michael Trainor which alludes to the town's ballroom culture and had been installed on South Promenade since 2002

South Shore includes two miles of beaches and several parks – Watson Road Park, Louie Horrocks Park, Bancroft Park and Highfield Road Memorial Park.

Palatine Library and Palatine Leisure Centre are both Blackpool Council-run facilities situated on St Anne's Road. Leisure facilities include a gym, racquet sports courts, a multipurpose sports hall, swimming pool, a 1 km outdoor enclosed cycle track and cafe.

The two main high streets in South Shore are Highfield Road and Waterloo Road. Highfield Road is home to Highfield Road Memorial Park, the former Highfield Road library, now repurposed as The Hub at South Shore, as well as several independent shops, bars and eateries. Waterloo Road is home to Blackpool's Notarianni's ice cream parlour, which has been run by four generations of Italian ice cream makers since 1937, and Brooks Collectables and Museum – a family-run business open since 1949.

The distinctive art deco Yates Wine Lodge on south promenade closed in 2022. The Waterloo Music Bar, which opened in 1900, was formerly known for its crown green bowling and is now a popular independent music venue, regularly hosting local and touring bands with a focus on the punk, rock and metal genres, since its reinvention in 2015.

The art deco Solaris Centre on South Promenade is a council-owned, multi-purpose venue that includes a cafe and hosts regular art exhibitions. The Friends of Solaris Park is a volunteer group that helps maintain the park to the rear of the building, which includes dementia gardens. Designed by civil architect JC Robinson, the building was constructed in 1938 as Harrowside Solarium and incorporated a winter garden, sun lounge and palm court style cafe. After falling into a state of disrepair the building was renovated by Mellor Architects in 2004 and became one of Blackpool's first eco buildings.

Alluding to the town's ballroom culture, They Shoot Horses, Don't They is an artwork by Michael Trainor that was installed on South Promenade in October 2002. At six metres in diameter and weighing six tonnes it was the world's largest dance hall mirror ball at the time, covered in 47,000 mirrors that gently rotate and catch the light. The mirror ball was one of ten public artworks on South Promenade called The Great Promenade Show, installed between 2001 and 2005. Blackpool's High Tide Organ by Liam Curtin and John Gooding, which made music from the swell of the tide, was removed in 2022 due to safety concerns.

== Education ==
There are seven primary schools in South Shore: Gateway Academy; St Cuthbert's; Hawes Side Academy; Our Lady of the Assumption Catholic Primary School; Roseacre Primary Academy; Waterloo Primary Academy and Thames Primary Academy, which opened in 1903 as South Shore Board School. High schools are: Highfield Leadership Academy and South Shore Academy, formerly named Knowle High School and Palatine High School. Armfield Academy is a combined school for pupils aged 2–16, built on the site of the former independent Arnold School, established in 1896, and retaining some of the original building.

== Religion ==
The parish church for South Shore is Holy Trinity Church. The current structure was built in 1895, replacing a church that was originally built in 1836. Other Anglican churches include St Christopher's; St Peter's, Holy Cross and St Mary's. The Catholic churches are St Cuthbert's and Our Lady of the Assumption. Other places of worship include Seventh Day Adventist Church, Bible Pattern Church, The Gatehouse Pentecostal Church, South Shore Methodist Church, Blackpool Unitarian Church and Victory Baptist Church.

== Transport ==
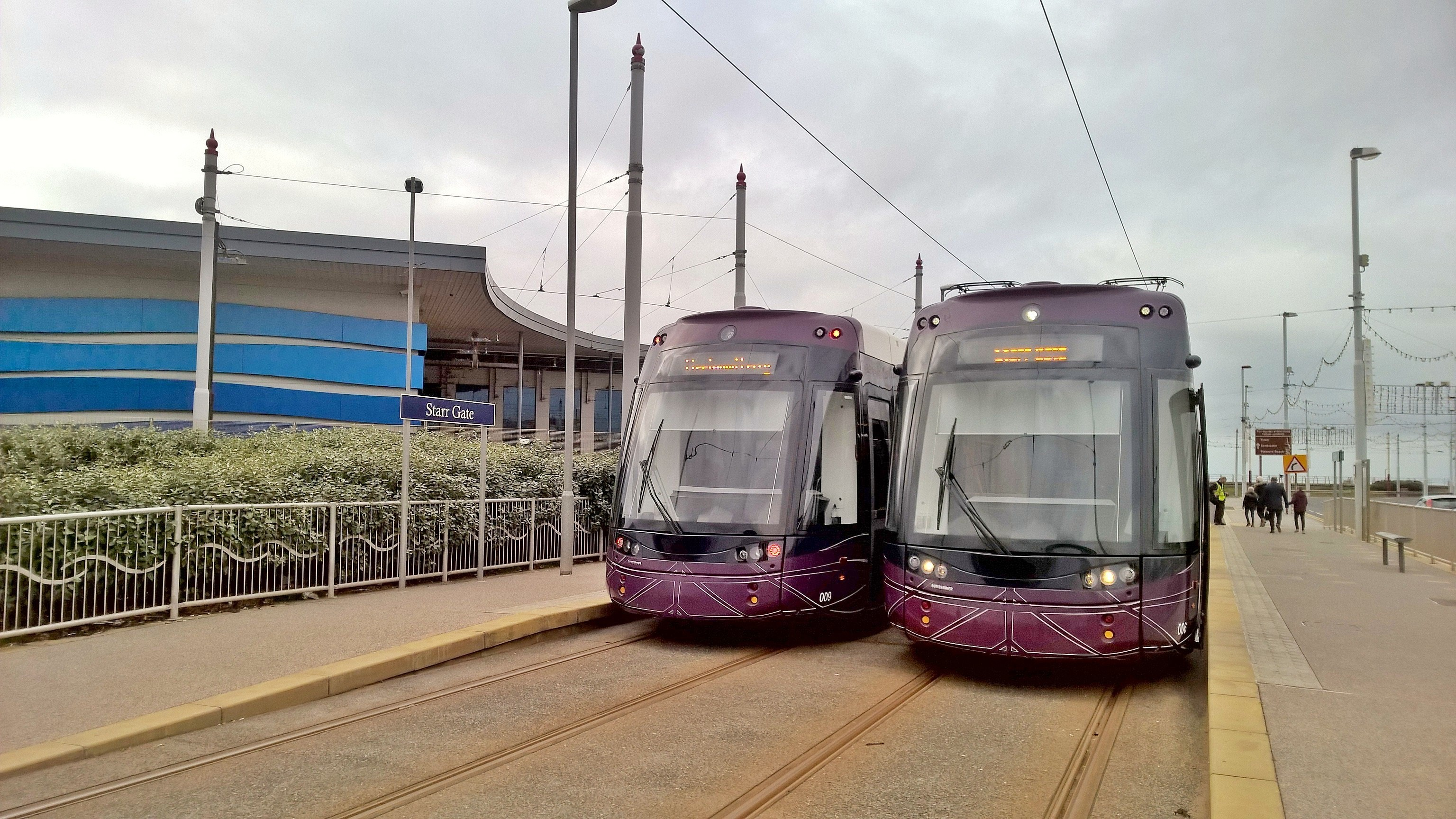
Starr Gate tram depot

The Blackpool Tramway has 14 stops in South Shore between Manchester Square and its terminus at Starr Gate.

Blackpool Airport, formerly known as Squires Gate Airport and Blackpool International Airport, offers executive flights and private aircraft facilities including for offshore oil and gas facilities in the Irish Sea. Aviation pioneer Amy Johnson's last complete flight was a ferry flight for the ATA from Squires Gate to Oxford. In March 2015, the government announced that a new enterprise zone would be created at Blackpool Airport, using some airport land and adjoining land.

South Shore has two railway stations – Squires Gate and Blackpool South. South Shore railway station on Lytham Road, was the area's first station in 1863. Burlington Road Halt also served the area from 1913 to 1939, replaced by Blackpool Pleasure Beach railway station on the same site in 1987. Waterloo Road railway station opened in 1903, later renamed Blackpool South.

== Sport ==
Bloomfield Road, the home of Blackpool F.C., is located in South Shore. South Shore also has a Tennis Club, Cricket and Squash Club and Bowling Club.

== Politics ==
South Shore covers several Blackpool Council wards fully or partially. These include Stanley, Squires Gate, Hawes Side, Highfield, Waterloo, Victoria and Bloomfield.

South Shore is in the Parliamentary Constituency of Blackpool South, represented in the House of Commons since 2024 by Chris Webb.
