= Holy Trinity Church, Blackpool =

Coordinates: 53.7965°N 3.0535°W

Holy Trinity, Blackpool
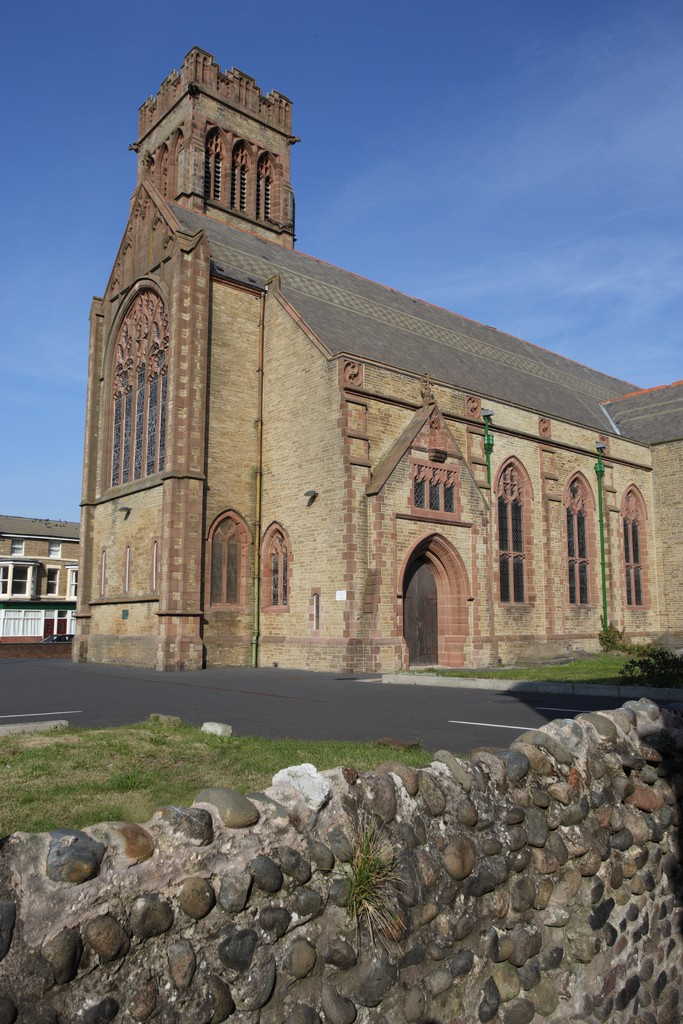
- Holy Trinity Church

- Location in Blackpool
- OS grid reference: SD 30732 33848
- Location: Blackpool, Lancashire
- Country: England
- Denomination: Church of England
- Website: www.htss.org.uk Official Facebook page

History
- Dedication: Holy Trinity

Architecture
- Functional status: Active
- Heritage designation: Grade II
- Designated: 20 October 1983
- Architect: Richard Knill Freeman
- Architectural type: Church
- Style: Decorated Gothic

Administration
- Province: York
- Diocese: Blackburn
- Archdeaconry: Lancaster
- Deanery: Blackpool
- Parish: Blackpool Holy Trinity South Shore

Holy Trinity Church is an Anglican church in Blackpool, Lancashire, England. Completed in 1895, the present church replaced one from 1836. Designed by Richard Knill Freeman in the Decorated Gothic style, it has been designated a Grade II listed building by English Heritage. It is an active parish church in the Diocese of Blackburn, the archdeaconry of Lancaster and the deanery of Blackpool.

== History ==
A church was first built on the site of Holy Trinity in 1836. It was located amongst sandhills, in what is now Dean Street in Blackpool's South Shore area. Designed by John Braithwaite, the church held 250 people. The church became a parish church in 1871. In the 1880s, damage to the building meant that a new church had to be built; it was completed in 1895. The new design was by Bolton architect Richard Knill Freeman. Holy Trinity was designated a Grade II listed building by English Heritage on 20 October 1983. The Grade II listing is for buildings that are "nationally important and of special interest".

== Architecture ==
The church was designed in the Decorated Gothic style and is constructed of yellow sandstone, with dressings in red sandstone and slate roofs. The tower to the north-west has five stages with angled buttresses and two-light belfry openings in triplets and a battlemented parapet. There is a turret with a red pyramidal roof as high as the third stage.

The nave and chancel are under a continuous high roof. The nave is of three bays with pilaster buttresses. The chancel has two bays and a timber vault. The transepts have two gables externally, with large four-light windows.

There is stained glass in windows to the east and west by Ward and Hughes, from the early 20th century. Two large windows in the south transept were designed in 1909 by Carl Almquist of Shrigley and Hunt.
