= Squires Gate railway station =

Railway station in Lancashire, England

Squires Gate
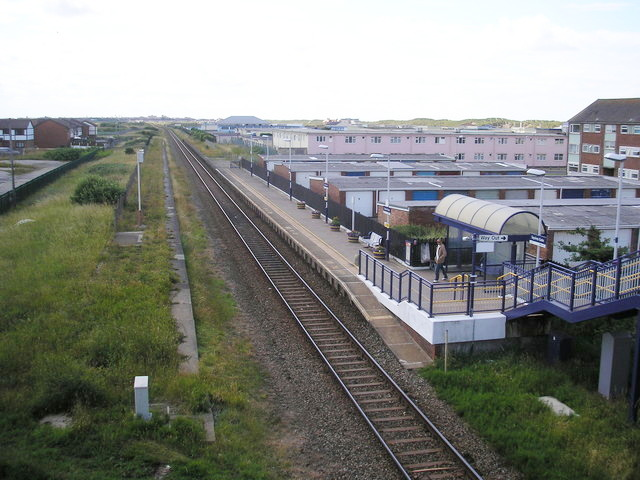

General information
- Location: Squires Gate, Fylde, England
- Coordinates: 53.7773°N 3.0503°W
- Grid reference: SD30883173
- Manager: Northern Trains
- Platforms: 1

Other information
- Station code: SQU
- Classification: DfT category F2

Key dates
- 1 April 1865: Stony Hill opened
- 1872: Stony Hill closed
- 14 September 1931: Squires Gate opened

Passengers
- 2021/22: ▲25,082
- 2022/23: ▲25,534
- 2023/24: ▲27,920
- 2024/25: ▼27,524
- 2025/26: ▼26,864
Location
Notes
- Passenger statistics from the Office of Rail and Road

Squires Gate railway station serves the Squires Gate area of Blackpool, Lancashire, England; however, the station itself lies just outside of the borough of Blackpool boundary in Fylde. It is a stop on the southern Blackpool branch line between Blackpool South and Preston. It is the nearest station to Blackpool Airport and is located 400 metres (1,300 ft) from Starr Gate tram stop on the Blackpool Tramway.

== History ==
Between 1865 and 1872, Stony Hill railway station was located in the same area. The present station opened on 14 September 1931 by the London Midland and Scottish Railway (LMS). The station hosted to several LMS camping coaches between 1937 and 1939; more were positioned here by the London Midland Region between 1954 and 1971.

It was planned that Squires Gate may have been renamed Blackpool International at some point, along with the provision of direct and flat surface access from the station to the airport.

== Facilities ==
The station is unstaffed. It has a ticket machine, digital passenger information screen, timetable posters and a long-line PA system to offer train running information; CCTV is in place.

== Services ==
The typical off-peak service operated by Northern Trains in trains per hour is:

- 1tph to Blackpool South
- 1tph to Preston.

Preceding station	National Rail	Following station
Blackpool Pleasure Beach	Northern Trains Blackpool Branch Line (southern)	St Annes-on-the-Sea
	Historical railways	
South Shore	London, Midland and Scottish Railway; Blackpool and Lytham Railway	St Annes- on-the-Sea

== See also ==
- Public transport in the Fylde
