= South Shore railway station =

Disused railway station in Lancashire

South Shore Lytham Road

General information
- Location: Lytham Road, opposite Station Road, South Shore, Blackpool; England
- Coordinates: 53.7957°N 3.0493°W
- Platforms: 2

Other information
- Status: Disused

History
- Original company: Blackpool and Lytham Railway
- Pre-grouping: Lancashire and Yorkshire Railway / London and North Western Railway

Key dates
- 1863: Opened as South Shore
- 1903: Renamed South Shore Lytham Road
- 14 July 1916: Closed
Location

South Shore railway station was originally the only intermediate station on the Blackpool and Lytham Railway, at South Shore in Lancashire, England, when it opened in 1863.

In 1903 it was renamed South Shore Lytham Road. In that same year the express Marton Line from Kirkham was built with a new Waterloo Road railway station at its junction with the Lytham line. The new station was just 300 yards (300 m) north of South Shore station, whose days were then numbered, closing in 1916. After closure the station building was moved to Rough Heys Lane where it was converted into a private house.

Preceding station	Disused railways	Following station
Waterloo Road	Blackpool and Lytham Railway	Burlington Road Halt
