= South Shore Academy =

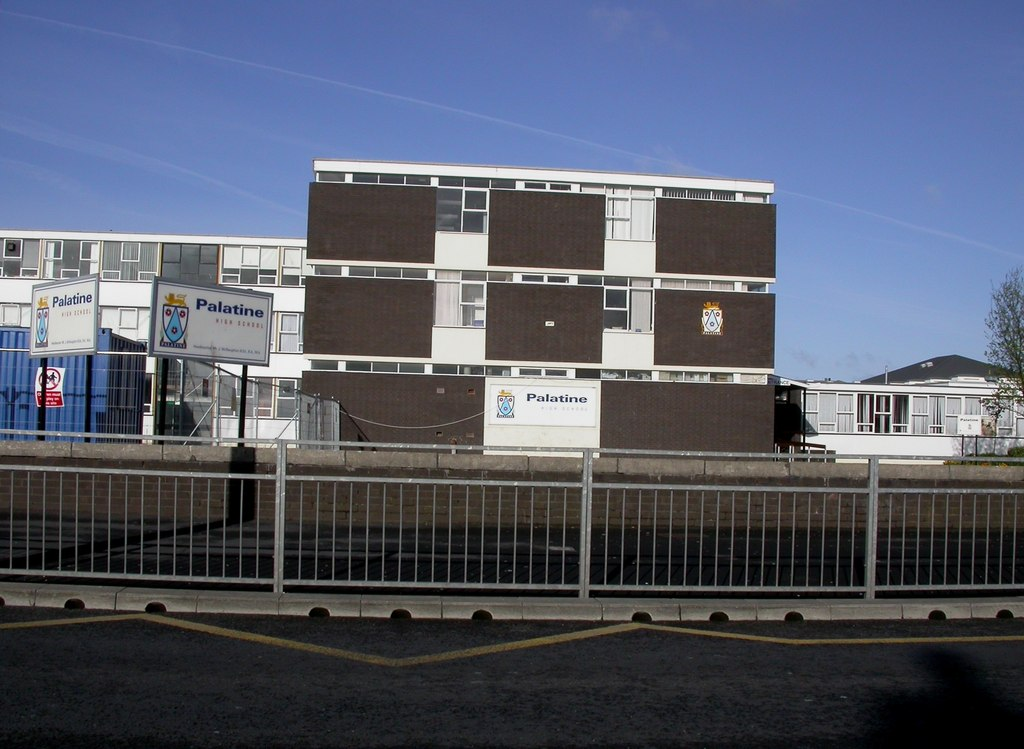
- The school in 2003

Location
- St Anne's Road; Blackpool, Lancashire, FY4 2AR; England; 53.79604°N 3.04264°W

Information
- Type: Academy
- Established: 1988
- Local authority: Blackpool
- Trust: Cidari Multi Academy Trust
- Department for Education URN: 140021 Tables
- Head teacher: Neil Reynolds
- Staff: 30+
- Gender: Coeducational
- Age: 11 to 16
- Enrolment: 711
- Houses: Redgrave, Moorhouse, Thomson And Lewis
- Colours: Bottle green blazer and black trousers or skirt
- Website: https://southshoreacademyblackpool.co.uk/

South Shore Academy (formerly Palatine Community Sports College) is a school in South Shore, Blackpool, Lancashire. A National Lottery Grant enabled the High School to be turned into a Community Sports College. A new leisure centre has been built on the grounds. The £6.5 million centre was opened on 13 February 2006, by Tessa Jowell. Palatine expanded the sports it provides for children in P.E. and started a new course, B-Tec first diploma in sport.

In December 2013 the former Palatine Community Sports College was converted into an academy by Bright Futures Education Trust (BFET)

== Ofsted ==
The 2012 Ofsted inspection reported the school to be "...an improving and increasingly popular school where standards and achievements are rising". The Ofsted inspection was the first in six years.
