= Blackpool Airport =

Airport in Lancashire, England

- IATA: BLK; ICAO: EGNH

Summary
- Airport type: Public
- Owner: Blackpool Council
- Operator: Blackpool Airport Operations Ltd.
- Serves: Blackpool
- Location: St Annes-on-the-Sea, Lancashire, England
- Built: 1909
- Elevation AMSL: 34 ft (10 m)
- Coordinates: 53°46′18″N 003°01′43″W
- Website: www.blackpoolairport.com

Map
- Location in Lancashire Location in Fylde Borough Location relative to Blackpool

Runways
Direction	Length		Surface
Direction	m	ft	Surface
10/28	1,868	6,129	Asphalt
13/31	998	3,274	Asphalt

Statistics (2025)
- Aircraft Movements: 38,140
- Movements change 24-25: ▼0.47%
- Sources: UK AIP at NATS; Statistics from the Civil Aviation Authority

Blackpool Airport (IATA: BLK, ICAO: EGNH) is a regional airport on the Fylde coast of Lancashire, England, in the Borough of Fylde, just outside the Borough of Blackpool. It was formerly known as Squires Gate Airport and Blackpool International Airport.

Ownership of the airport has changed a number of times over the years. The airport was wholly owned by Blackpool Borough Council until 2004, when it was sold to a consortium led by Wolverhampton Airport operators City Hopper Ltd (CHAL), who operated it until May 2008 when Balfour Beatty purchased MAR Property's 95% stake. Blackpool Borough Council retained 5%. During 2014 Balfour Beatty claimed to be looking for a buyer for the airport, and then after just one month announced that it was to close the Airport. On 15 October 2014, the airport's terminal and Air Traffic Control provision was closed, with the last scheduled flights to Dublin and the Isle of Man leaving in the late afternoon. In November 2014, the former company formed a new company, called Squires Gate Airport Operations Ltd, and the airport reopened once again in December 2014 for non-commercial operations.

Executive flights are operated by Hangar 3 Blackpool Ltd, which offer access to a private aircraft hangar and private aircraft management as well as a flight briefing room and lounge facilities. NHV Helicopters operate helicopter services to the offshore oil and gas facilities in the Irish Sea, using two Agusta Westland helicopters from a purpose-built helicopter terminal facility. Blackpool Airport is also home to one of three Eurocopter EC135 helicopters operated by the North West Air Ambulance service; the other two helicopters operate from Manchester Barton and are regular visitors to Blackpool. UK Aviation Services (formerly J-Max Air Services) specialise in the maintenance and repair of corporate and commercially owned helicopters. The company holds EASA Part 145 approvals for various Bell, Leonardo, Sikorsky, Airbus, Robinson, Guimbal and MD helicopters. There are many other companies situated on the airfield which offer flying lessons, training, private aircraft hire and maintenance facilities.

Blackpool Airport Limited has a Civil Aviation Authority (CAA) Public Use Aerodrome Licence (Number P724) that allows flights for the public transport of passengers or for flying instruction. Passenger numbers peaked in 2007, with over 550,000 passing through the airport, but had fallen to 235,238 in 2012. In 2014, the last year of commercial operations, the airport handled 223,372 passengers, a drop of 15% compared to the 2013 stats; this is due to the stats running from 1 January until the closure of the airport on 15 October.

The airport is served by Squires Gate railway station.

== History ==
The airport site's first aviation use was in October 1909, when the UK's first official public Flying Meeting was held on a specially laid out site at Squires Gate, followed by another in 1910. Between 1911 and 1915 the site became Blackpool Racecourse, and it was used as a military hospital during World War I and until 1924. Flights from the site resumed in the early 1930s. Small UK airlines used the airfield during the mid-1930s. Railway Air Services commenced schedules to Blackpool from 15 April 1935, linking the airport with the Isle of Man, Manchester and Liverpool. Connections could be made at the two cities to London and the south and west of England. In June 1937, airline operations were transferred to Stanley Park Aerodrome. The sister of aviation pioneer Amy Johnson lived in Stanley Park, resulting in her often paying a visit; Johnson's last complete flight was a ferry flight for the Air Transport Auxiliary from Squires Gate to Oxford.

=== RAF Squires Gate ===
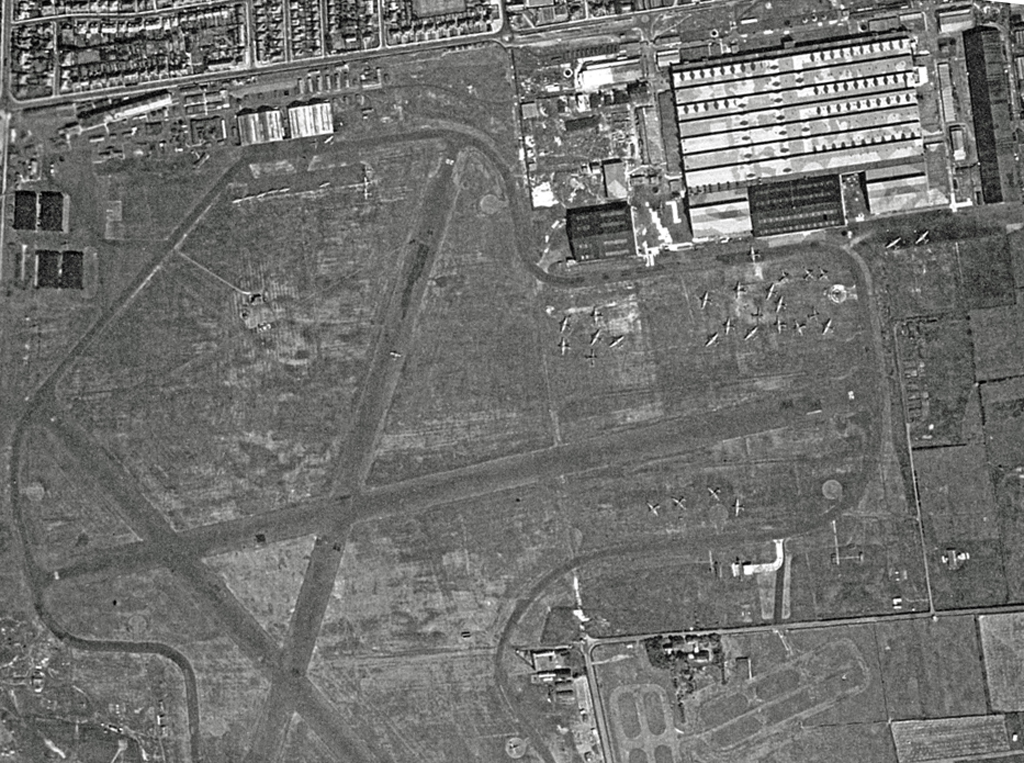
RAF Squires Gate in summer 1945. The Vickers factory is top right with 23 Wellington bombers scattered below. Avro Ansons of the No. 3 School of General Reconnaissance can be seen at top and lower right

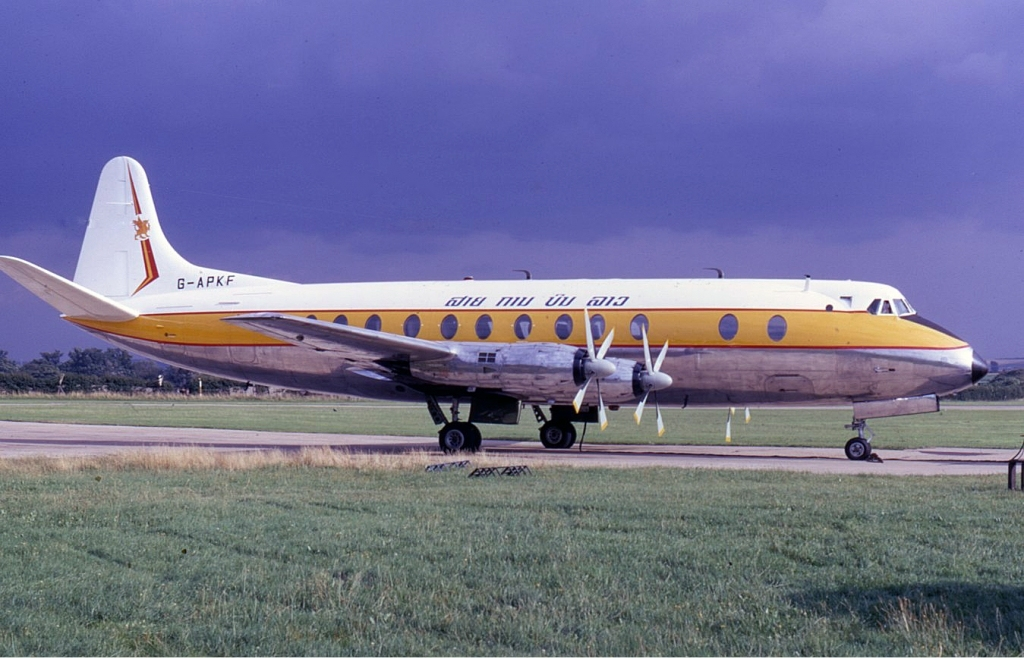
A Royal Air Lao Vickers Viscount at the airport in 1968.

Work on enlarging and improving the airfield and facilities began in late 1937, but the aerodrome was requisitioned by the Air Ministry in 1938. Three bituminous runways were laid to support operations, with squadrons stationed at RAF Squires Gate during World War II including:

- No. 63 Squadron, September 1939 to January 1940
- No. 75 Squadron, September 1939 to January 1940
- No. 215 Squadron, September 1939 to January 1940
- No. 96 Squadron
- No. 256 Squadron
- No. 308 Polish Fighter Squadron, September 1940 - October 1941

RAF Coastal Command also established an operational base on site, and expanded RAF Warton to act as a satellite airfield.

==== Training wing ====
The RAF also selected Blackpool as one of its training wings due to the availability of accommodation. Training was based between Squires Gate and the British Army camps at Weeton and Kirkham, utilising the large number of guest houses, plus the beaches, pier, and the Winter Gardens for exercising; 769,673 recruits received their basic training at Blackpool. The RAF also established two specialist training schools:

- No. 3 School of General Reconnaissance
- No. 5 School of Technical Training, for air mechanics

==== Vickers shadow factory ====
The Ministry of Aircraft Production erected a shadow aircraft factory during 1939–1940 in the north-east corner of the airfield to enable Vickers-Armstrongs to operate an aircraft production facility at Squires Gate. This produced 2,584 Wellington medium bombers, several hundred of which were assembled and flown from Stanley Park Aerodrome before landing at Squires Gate for testing and delivery. The first was completed in September 1940 and the last in October 1945, when the factory closed.

The factory was reopened by Hawker Aircraft in the mid-1950s to augment the production of Hawker Hunter jet fighters, under contract SP/6ACFT/9817/CB 7a. Many Hunters were also built for the Swedish Air Force.

==== Post-war years ====
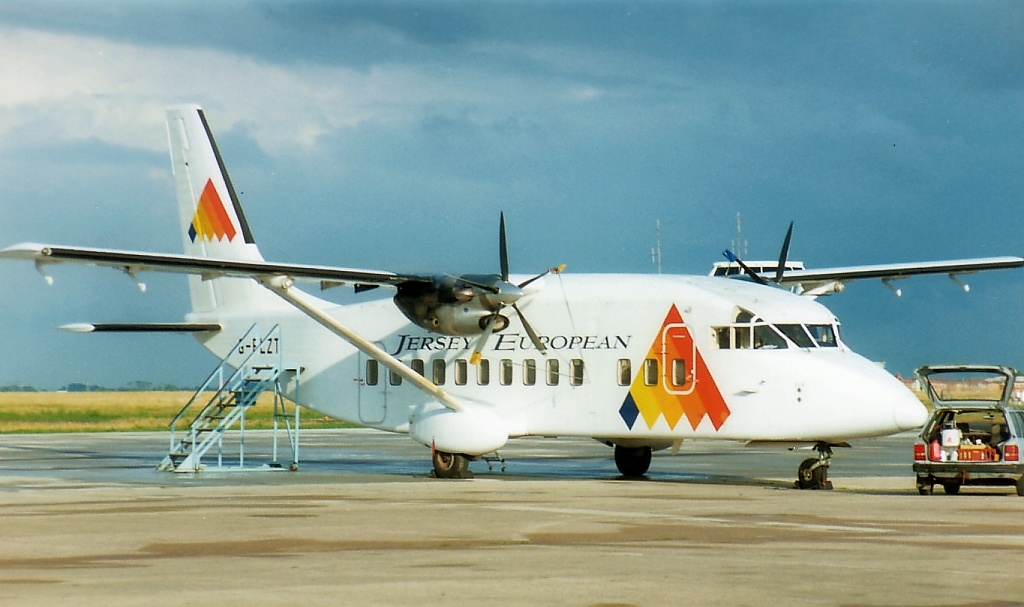
A Jersey European Short 360 at the airport in the late 1990s.

Scheduled flights were resumed by Isle of Man Air Services in summer 1946. Lancashire Aircraft Corporation and other private airlines established their bases at the airport from 1946 onwards. By 1949, the airfield was controlled by the Ministry of Civil Aviation and renamed Blackpool Airport.

Prior to 2004, when the airport was sold to City Hopper Airports Limited, the airport was owned and operated by Blackpool Borough Council, who were losing £1 million per year before the £13 million sale.

Speaking about the sale, Julian Kearsley, strategic director of business services at the town hall, who helped broker the deal, said: "The airport is a key element in terms of developing the new Blackpool. It is not as if the council has sold off the family silver and lost any role in this. We wish to see the terminal continue as an airport as part of our ambitious plans for revitalising the whole area. This deal will see more jobs, it will save the council money and it protects the employment of people already there."

Cllr Roy Fisher, leader of Blackpool Council, said: "The sale of Blackpool Airport once agreed will be great news for everyone in Blackpool."

Cllr Robert Wynne, portfolio holder for partnerships, business and companies, added: "A year ago the council set itself specific targets with regard to Blackpool Airport: we wanted more flights, particularly those that brought people to the town, we wanted more quality jobs and we wanted a better deal for the council taxpayer. This agreement fulfils all those objectives. We will end up with a much better and busier airport at no cost whatsoever to the council taxpayer."

=== Development 2005–2010 ===
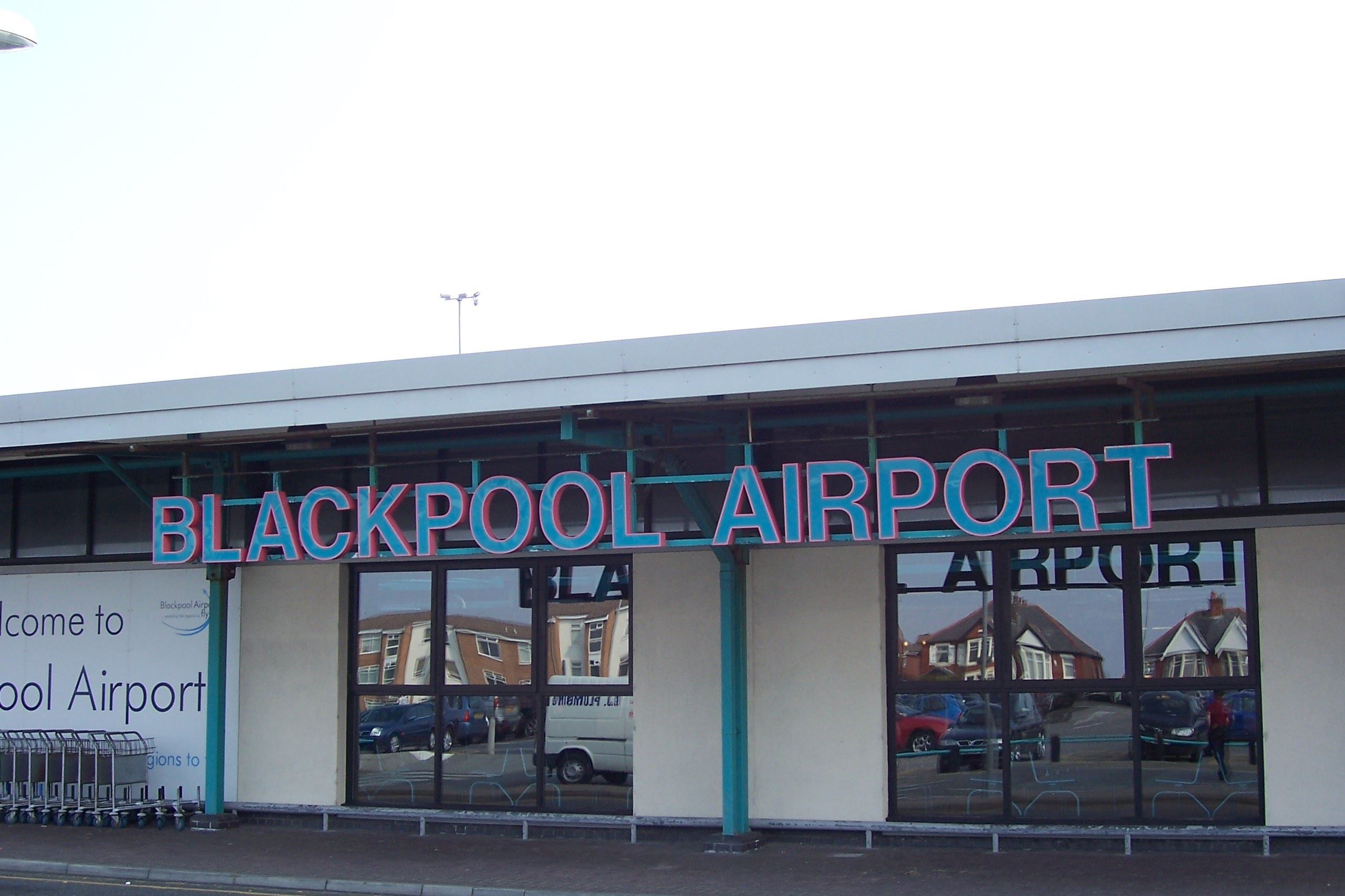
Terminal Building at Blackpool Airport in 2005

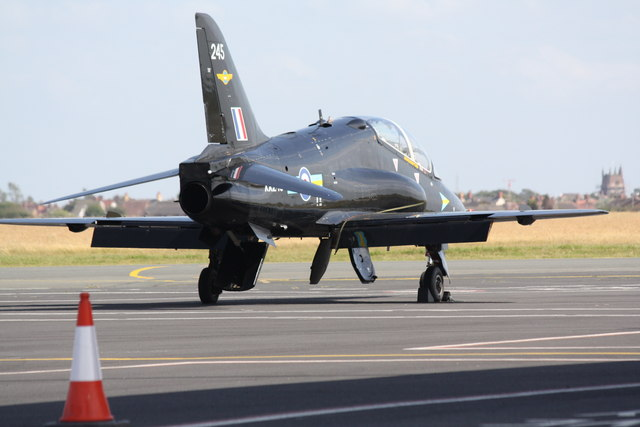
RAF Hawk jet at Blackpool Airport (2008)

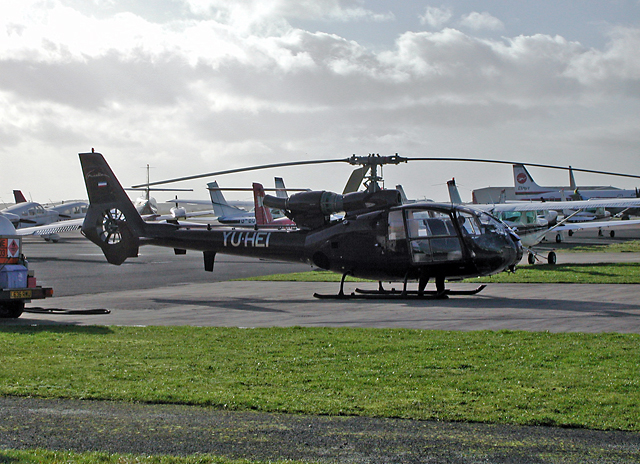
General aviation area at Blackpool Airport (2004)

In the first decade of the 21st century, the airport steadily expanded, accommodating further helicopter operations for British Gas and attracting scheduled flights from budget airlines Jet2 and Ryanair. Since World War II, the airport has also been a centre for private, club, and general aviation.

In 2005, Jet2 became the first major low cost airline to base an aircraft at Blackpool Airport. This created around 50 new jobs and boosted passenger numbers. It used to serve seven destinations from the airport—five in Spain (Palma, Alicante, Murcia, Tenerife South, Málaga), one in Portugal (Faro), and a domestic service to Belfast. Also in 2005, Monarch set up a new route to Málaga, three times a week. The airline ceased services after a year, blaming low passenger numbers. However, Jet2 had earlier announced that it would be operating flights to Málaga.

Until January 2006 an Avro Vulcan bomber (registration XL391) was on static external display close to the entrance to the airport. XL391's last operational role was at Ascension Island during the Falklands War in 1982; however, it only flew as a backup aircraft and never actually went to the Falklands. It was put up for sale in October 2004 on eBay and purchased by Manchester pub landlord Chris Ollerenshaw (for £15,102.03), who had intentions to transport it to his pub and display it in his beer garden. However, after finding out that the condition of the aircraft was so poor that moving it would be extremely challenging and that it would cost over £20,000, in addition to the reported £1,000 a week storage charge, Ollerenshaw pulled out of the deal and later relinquished ownership of the plane back to the airport. The Vulcan was then sold on for scrap for £4,800, and was completely removed from the site and scrapped on 12 January 2006.

During 2006, British NorthWest Airlines, the smallest airline based at Blackpool, stopped trading for both charter and scheduled flights. Flights to the Isle of Man were taken over by Citywing up to three times a day, with an onward connection to Belfast City. Citywing brought low fares to the Isle of Man and Belfast routes and passenger numbers on these route vastly increased in January 2007.

With the growth of the airport, a new carrier, operating under the name Jetstream Express, introduced flights in 2007 to Belfast City Airport (from May), Aberdeen Airport (from June) and Southampton Airport (from July). The Belfast route was in competition with Jet2, who operated a twice daily service to Northern Ireland. Two Jetstream 31s were based at the airport to support the operation, however, the service ended in June 2007 as the routes had not proved viable.

In 2007, Jet2 cancelled its Prague and Amsterdam services, blaming insufficient passenger numbers.

The airport was owned and operated by City Hopper Airports Limited, which also owns Wolverhampton Airport and Biella Airport in Italy, until January 2007, when it was placed under new management after one of its two major shareholders bought out its partner. MAR Properties Ltd agreed terms to take over full control of Blackpool and Wolverhampton Airports. In May 2008, it was announced that Balfour Beatty, who also owned Exeter Airport and Londonderry Eglinton Airport, had purchased MAR Property's 95% stake in the airport; the remaining 5% stake was held by Blackpool Borough Council.

On 6 May 2008, Balfour Beatty bought the 95% stake of the airport off CityHopper Airports Ltd for £14 million. The construction company also owned Exeter Airport.

On 18 July 2008, the Blackpool Gazette announced that Jet2 planned to suspend its daily service from Blackpool to Belfast International for the winter. A dip in passenger numbers and the rising price of oil had taken its toll on the service. According to the newspaper, Jet2 would restart the daily Belfast service from March 2009.

In the summer of 2008 Ryanair announced a large cut in capacity at a number of airports, including Stansted, from October 2008 to March 2009, although Blackpool was not affected by these cuts. However, on 25 November 2008, Ryanair announced the intention to withdraw all flights from 5 January 2009, following the airport's introduction of a £10 per person Airport Development Fee.

After the £10 Airport Development Fee was introduced at the start of 2009, a new airline was sought to replace Ryanair on its very popular route to Dublin. Aer Arann were their successors and commenced operations shortly after. The flights continued until the closure of the airport in 2014.

=== Development 2011–2014 ===
During 2011 the airfield underwent a number of changes. Runway 07/25 was closed as an active runway and was re-opened as Taxiway C. The previous Taxiway C was closed and its northern part, between Runway 10/28 and the old Runway 07/25, was opened as an extension of Taxiway E. Another notable change was the relocation of the airport's Fire Services from north of the fuel farm to a more central position, between the terminal and some of the flying clubs, on the Taxiway B ramp.

On 28 January 2012 plans were unveiled to launch a twice-weekly service to Albert–Picardie Airport with Danish Air Transport using an ATR-72 aircraft. The new route was planned to start in the last week of April, however the flights were cancelled before the route was officially opened.

During June 2012 Jet2.com announced plans to fly to Dalaman and Ibiza from May 2013. About a week later, the company also added Lanzarote to its destination list. Jersey had been replaced by Ibiza for the 2013 season, which brought the Jet2 destination list up to 10.

At the beginning of November 2012 it was announced by Jet2 that they would fly to Lanzarote all year round. This was a further development to the schedule, which saw the addition of three new destinations to airport, and three destinations for the company during the winter months. Following Jet2's announcement that it would offer a year-round service to Lanzarote, the airline also revealed plans to operate the service with a larger aircraft starting in October 2013. This announcement came at the start of April, just before the summer season began. The aircraft they would use was the larger Boeing 737-800, something which had not been seen at Blackpool since Ryanair discontinued their 737-800 services in January 2009.

On 13 May 2013 Jet2 announced, via their website, that they had re-added Menorca to Blackpool Airport's destination list. The weekly flight would depart from Blackpool from 21 May 2014 and would be available to book throughout the summer.

Following the end of the 2013 summer season, it was announced that Jet2 was cancelling their Belfast flight because of continuous falling passenger figures. The loss of the Belfast service brought Jet2's destinations at the resort airport down to 10, leaving Citywing as the only airline operating a daily flight to Belfast, via the Isle of Man.

Statistically, 2013 was the best year for passenger movements through the airport since 2009, with 262,630 passengers using the facility. The increase was directly linked to the introduction of three new summer Jet2 destinations, Dalaman, Ibiza and Lanzarote, which increased the passenger count by around 10% over the previous year.

On 4 April 2014 it was announced, via an update on the Dart Group website, that holidaymakers from across Lancashire would enjoy further choice in the summer of 2015, with a new Spanish destination from the airport. The new route, starting from May 2015, would be Reus in eastern Spain. This would take the total number of Jet2 destinations to 11 and the number of destinations to mainland Spain to four.

During the last week of August 2014, Balfour Beatty announced that it was to put the airport up for sale. The Blackpool Gazette reported that the company had "decided to sell its operating interests in the site as part of a wider decision to sell all its interests in regional airports." The news came six years after the company bought a 95% stake in the airport for £14m.

On 7 October 2014 it was announced that the airport would close on 15 October 2014, as a buyer could not be found. The final scheduled flight was V9117 to Isle of Man, operated by Citywing and the final commercial flight was EGL62X to Exeter, operated by Capital Air Charter.

On 18 November 2014 Squires Gate Airport Operations (a firm set up by parent organisation and airport owner Balfour Beatty) bought the airport from Balfour Beatty. It was understood the operations would not be on the same scale as those before 15 October, when the airport closed with debts reaching £34M and with the loss of 100 jobs.

=== Re-opening and development from 2015 ===
In March 2015, the government announced that a new enterprise zone would be created at Blackpool Airport, using some airport land and some adjoining land. Existing operations at the airport would not be affected. Blackpool Airport reopened flying to Isle of Man and Belfast but from a smaller building.

It was announced in January 2016 that planning permission had finally been given, despite protests from local residents, to demolish the former passenger terminal and replace it with a new Energy College as part of the renewable energy sector of Blackpool and The Fylde College. The former main terminal had been fully renovated and modernised in 2005 and was capable of handling 2 million passengers a year. The terminal had been left empty and unused since the airport closed in October 2014, and all the landside and airside equipment was auctioned off in 2015. Demolition of the terminal began in February 2016 and took around 4 weeks to complete. After the demolition was complete, the construction of the new college began.

A dedicated facility for Citywings' operations opened in the former Jet2 administration offices and housed a check-in desk, reception lounge, toilet facilities and a small departure lounge. The new facility also has access to security, so passengers no longer need to walk outside and through the Vehicle Search Point (VSP) to gain airside access.

The airport has seen a steady increase in general aviation, business jet, and the occasional military movements since re-opening in 2014. This increase in traffic is a direct result of increased airfield fire cover as the airport now maintains category 3 cover throughout the working week, with higher categories available on request. In 2021, the airport increased the fire category to category 4 during the hours of operation. This enables the airport to accept a category 5 aircraft on remission. Fire category 6 is available on request with a minimum of 24 hours notice and suitable staffing levels within the fire crew and ATC.

In June 2022 there was speculation about reopening the airport by the then prime minister Boris Johnson, who stated that it would make "a fantastic business case". However Johnson's suggestions were dismissed by the local council as "political posturing".

== Offshore helicopter operations ==
For many years Blackpool has been the base of an offshore helicopter operation, flying crews to and from the Irish Sea oil and gas fields since the early 1980s. All offshore flights are operated through the purpose-built helicopter terminal which officially opened in October 1985 which is located next to the former main passenger terminal (now Energy College).

Originally, flights were operated by Bond Helicopters/Management Aviation prior to being acquired by CHC Scotia until operations were taken over on 1 January 2010 by Bond Offshore Helicopters. Bond Offshore Helicopters became Babcock MCS on 25 April 2016.

On 5 May 2020 it was announced that NHV Helicopters had won a long-term contract with Spirit Energy to provide passenger transfer services in support of their East Irish Sea operations. NHV Helicopters took over the contract from Babcock MCS on 1 December 2020. NHV currently operate 2x AgustaWestland AW169 7 days a week to various oil and gas platforms in the Irish Sea (see list below). The end of Babcock MCS operations also ended 37 years of Dauphin operations from Blackpool.

Airlines	Destinations
NHV Helicopters	Calder, Conwy, Douglas, Hamilton, Lennox, Millom, Morecambe, OSI

== Statistics ==
Blackpool Airport Movements 2015–2024 (in thousands)
Updated: 29 May 2025

Airport traffic by calendar year from 2016 to 2025
Year	Passengers	Aircraft movements	Executive movements
2016	36,269	33,749	883
2017	23,391	33,429	876
2018	19,321	37,526	864
2019	15,213	36,289	700
2020	11,412	25,404	396
2021*	0	39,587	413
2022*	9,428	37,259	649
2023	14,365	38,918	597
2024	18,739	38,735	795
2025	18,610	38,140	910
Source: CAA Official Statistics; *Oil rig passenger numbers not included between January 2021 and May 2022 inclusive. Updated: 29 Oct 2026

Passenger numbers on former scheduled routes to and from Blackpool Airport (2014)
Rank	Airport	Passengers
1	Alicante	35,652
2	Palma	27,717
3	Faro	27,161
4	Málaga	21,708
5	Tenerife South	20,741
6	Isle of Man	14,890
7	Dublin	14,624
8	Lanzarote	10,990
9	Murcia	10,112
10	Ibiza	9,841

== Accidents and incidents ==
- On 29 June 1972, a HFB 320 Hansa Jet, registration D-CASY, failed to rotate during take-off on a flight bound for Munich and overran the runway, damaging the railway line south of Squires Gate railway station and crashing into the Pontins Blackpool holiday park, destroying six chalets. Of the eight passengers and crew on board, only one survived with serious injuries. The passengers were employees of Messerschmitt-Bölkow-Blohm, working at Warton Aerodrome.
- On 27 September 1982, Douglas C-47 G-AKNB of Harvest Air was damaged beyond economic repair in an accident at Blackpool Airport.
- On 27 December 2006, a Eurocopter AS365 Dauphin, registration G-BLUN, crashed into the Irish Sea, 24 miles offshore. There were 7 persons on board the helicopter, 5 passengers and 2 crew. Six bodies were recovered however the 7th body was sadly never found. The helicopter was based at Blackpool Airport and the flight had also originated from the Squires Gate base.
- On 3 February 2007, a Piper PA-28 Cherokee registered G-BBBK was inbound to Blackpool when it crashed on the Fylde Coast. The VFR flight had originated from Exeter Airport, and the pilot was attempting to land in thick fog. He failed to locate the airport, and continued several miles north before losing altitude and crashing in shallow water between the central and southern piers. Both occupants were killed.
- On 2 December 2015, a Rockwell Commander aircraft registered as 2-ROAM was inbound to Blackpool Airport from the Isle of Man. The Aircraft was flying in thick cloud and fog which was as low as 200 ft. The aircraft lost contact with Air Traffic at 09:15 on 2 December. The RNLI and Search and Rescue crews found wreckage from the aircraft a few miles from the coast of Blackpool.
- On 16 November 2023, at 5:30pm a Robin R200 aircraft registered as G-HIGB, owned by the local High-G Flight Training, made a forced landing on the Blackpool Promenade three kilometers north of the airfield after reports of engine trouble. No injuries were reported, and likewise there was no damage to the aircraft involved.

== See also ==
- Public transport in the Fylde
