= Saint Aidan's Church of England High School, Preesall =

Saint Aidan's Church of England High School
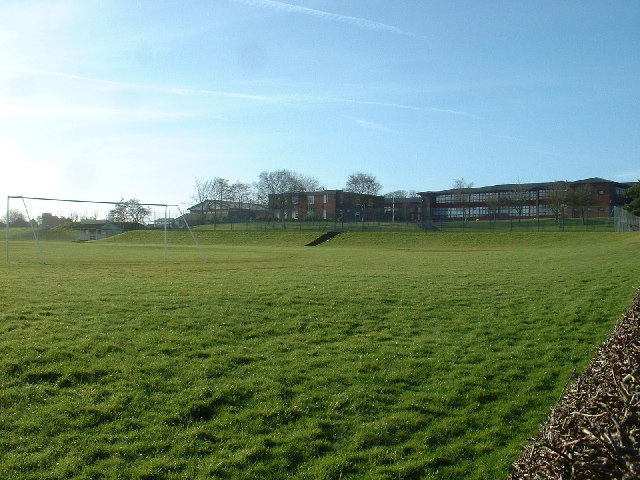

Location
- Cartgate; Preesall, Lancashire, FY6 0NP; England; 53.916147°N 2.96324°W

Information
- Type: Voluntary aided, Comprehensive school
- Motto: “That they might have life, and have it in all its fullest”
- Local authority: Lancashire
- Department for Education URN: 119789 Tables
- Ofsted: Reports
- Head: Katie Benter
- Age: 11 to 16
- Enrolment: 844
- Colours: Maroon, White and black
- Newspaper: Live Wyre
- Website: www.st-aidans.lancs.sch.uk

Saint Aidan's Church of England High School (formerly Saint Aidan's Church of England Technology College) is a Church of England voluntary aided school located in Preesall, England. In an Ofsted report in 2023, the school was rated Grade 2 (Good) overall. They are well known within the local community, and are notable as having above-average GCSE results and an outstanding approach to health and safety. St Aidan's are responsible for the schooling of Barney Harwood, a well-known CBBC presenter. A new sports hall, costing £1.5 million, was opened in July 2023.
