= Blackpool Pleasure Beach railway station =

Railway station in Lancashire, England

Blackpool Pleasure Beach
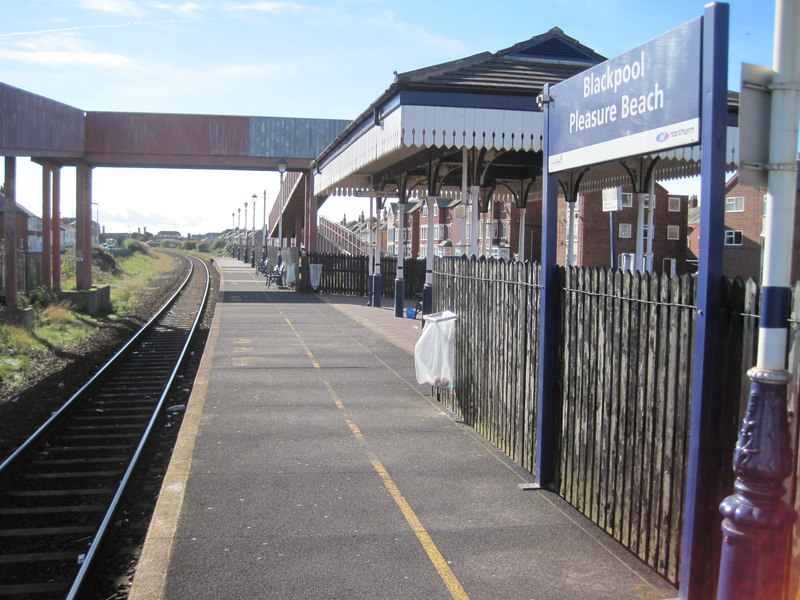

General information
- Location: Blackpool, Borough of Blackpool, England
- Coordinates: 53.7879°N 3.0540°W
- Grid reference: SD306329
- Manager: Northern Trains
- Platforms: 1

Other information
- Station code: BPB
- Classification: DfT category F1

Key dates
- 1 October 1913: Burlington Road Halt opened
- 11 September 1939: Burlington Road Halt closed
- April 1987: Pleasure Beach station opened

Passengers
- 2020/21: ▼47,680
- 2021/22: ▲137,134
- 2022/23: ▼133,082
- 2023/24: ▲133,652
- 2024/25: ▼118,576
Location
Notes
- Passenger statistics from the Office of Rail and Road

Blackpool Pleasure Beach railway station serves the Pleasure Beach Resort amusement park in Blackpool, Lancashire, England. It is the next station after Blackpool South on the southern Blackpool branch line to Preston. The station is located 300 metres (980 ft) from Burlington Road West tram stop on the Blackpool Tramway.

== History ==
The station opened on 13 April 1987. The cost was shared by Blackpool Pleasure Beach Company, British Rail, Lancashire County Council and Blackpool Borough Council. The station has one platform and is unstaffed. The station lies on the same site as Burlington Road Halt, which operated a railmotor service between 1913 and 1939.

== Facilities ==
Though unstaffed, it has a ticket machine in the main platform waiting shelter and a digital information screen to supply train running information, which is also available from timetable posters, a pay phone and a digital PA system. Step-free access is available from the adjacent street.

== Services ==
The typical off-peak service in trains per hour is:

- 1tph to Blackpool South
- 1tph to Preston.

Preceding station	National Rail	Following station
Blackpool South	Northern Trains Blackpool Branch Line	Squires Gate
	Disused railways	
South Shore	Blackpool and Lytham Railway	Squires Gate

== See also ==
- Public transport in the Fylde
