= Blackpool South railway station =

Railway station in Lancashire, England

Blackpool South
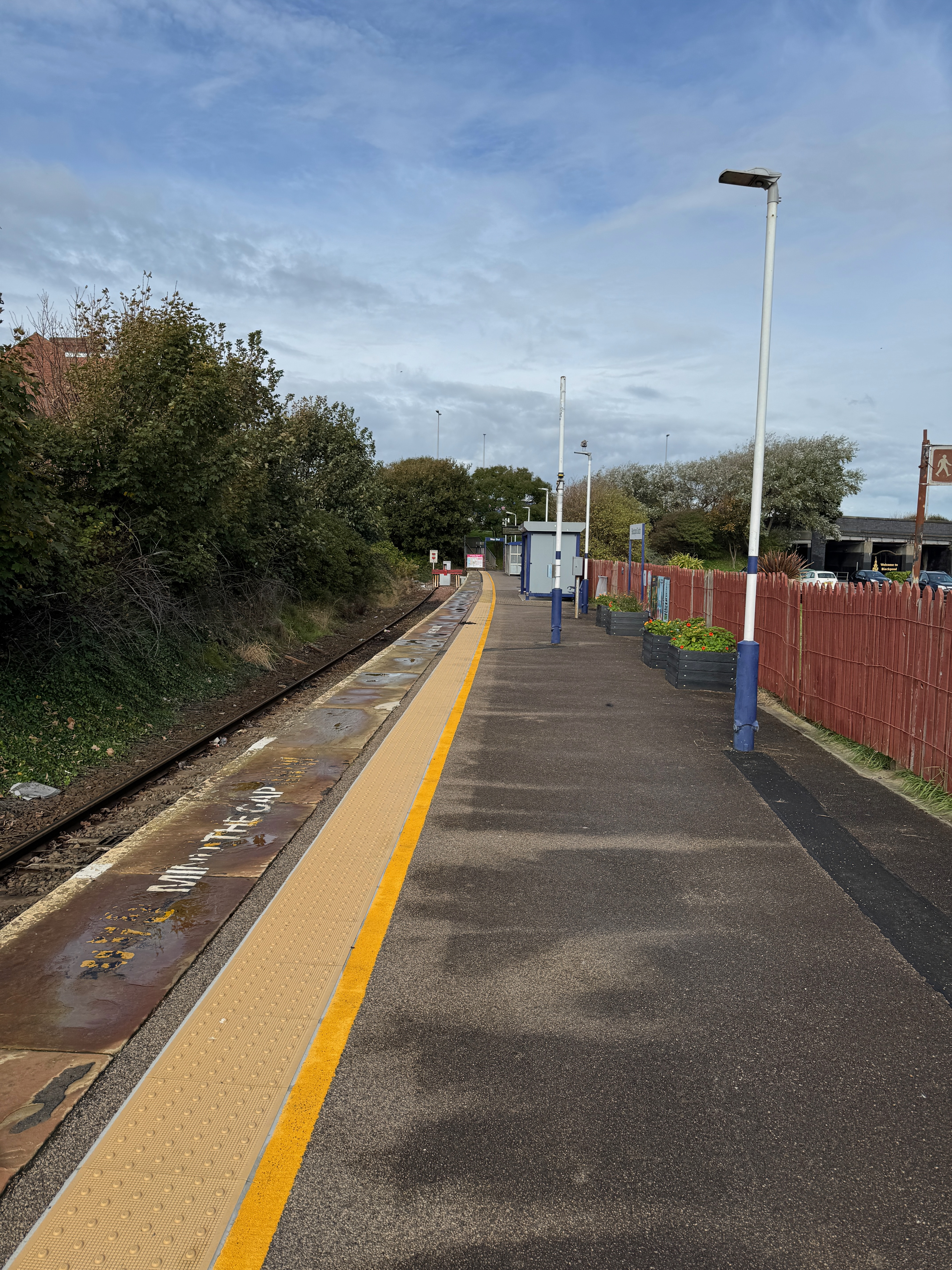
- The station in 2024

General information
- Location: South Shore, Borough of Blackpool, England
- Coordinates: 53.7983°N 3.0488°W
- Grid reference: SD310340
- Manager: Northern Trains
- Platforms: 1

Other information
- Station code: BPS
- Classification: DfT category F1

Key dates
- 30 May 1903: Opened as Waterloo Road
- 17 March 1932: Renamed Blackpool South

Passengers
- 2020/21: ▼30,040
- 2021/22: ▲97,984
- 2022/23: ▲0.105 million
- 2023/24: ▲0.115 million
- 2024/25: ▼0.114 million
Location
Notes
- Passenger statistics from the Office of Rail and Road

Blackpool South railway station serves the suburban south of Blackpool, in Lancashire, England. It is the terminus of the South Fylde Line, around 12 miles (19 km) west of Kirkham and Wesham, though all services run through from Preston. The station is managed by Northern Trains, which operates all trains serving it. Blackpool South is located around 500 metres (1,600 ft) from Waterloo Road tram stop on the Blackpool Tramway.

== History ==
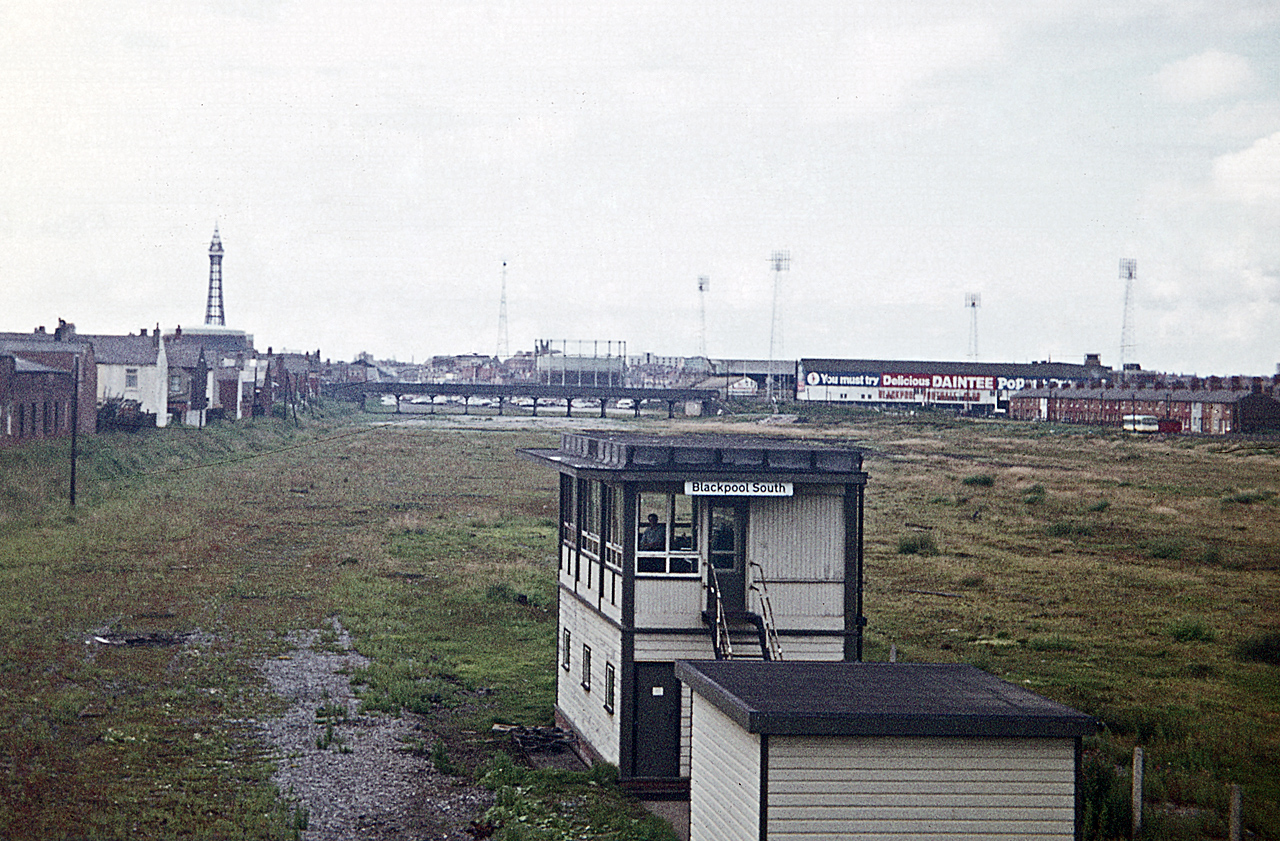
Blackpool South signalbox, 1973

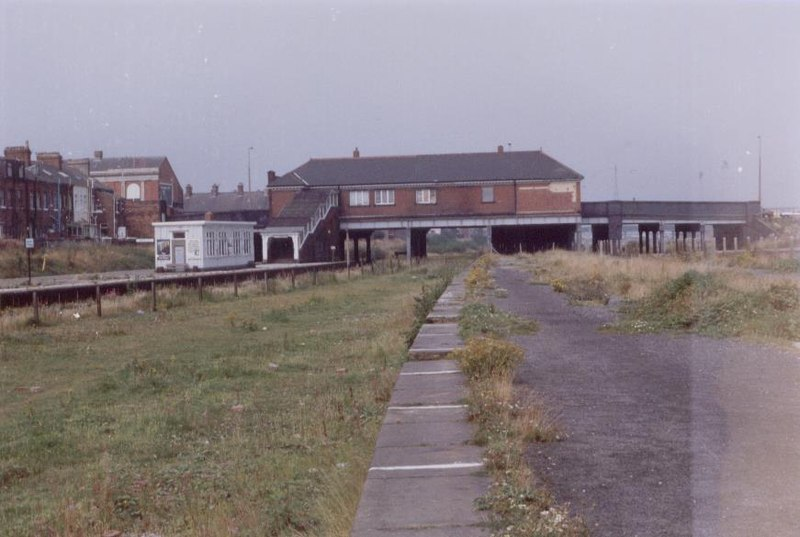
Blackpool South station in 1983, showing the former size of the station. At this point only the platform to the far left was in use

The station was originally called Waterloo Road when it opened in 1903, at the junction with a newly built express Marton Line direct from Kirkham. The platforms on the coastal Fylde line were opened on 14 July 1916 and replaced South Shore. It now had four platforms (two for each line at the junction) and soon became a busy station. There were extensive sidings to accommodate the many excursion trains which came to Blackpool.

Until November 1964, the line extended north from here to Blackpool Central. The Marton Line closed to regular traffic in 1965; its track bed is now the road called Yeadon Way and the M55 motorway.

The station continued to handle through trains from Manchester, Liverpool and London until 1970, when these were all diverted to Blackpool North at the other end of town. It was then reduced to local status only, although it kept its signal box, two working platform faces and double track until 1982. The box was notable in that it was located on the opposite side of Waterloo Road bridge from the station; it could not see the tracks and platforms it controlled, instead being surrounded by the disused railway land once occupied by the main line and aforementioned sidings. After the line was singled north of St Anne's-on-the-Sea and the box was abolished, all trains used the former northbound platform and continue to do so to the present day. The substantial main buildings (booking office and waiting rooms) that formerly existed at street level were demolished in 1985.

For much of the 1970s and early 1980s, nearly all services terminated at Kirkham, where passengers were forced to change if wanting to travel further east; from 1988, however, they were integrated with those on the East Lancashire Line, a timetable pattern that remained in place seven days a week until May 2018.

== Facilities ==
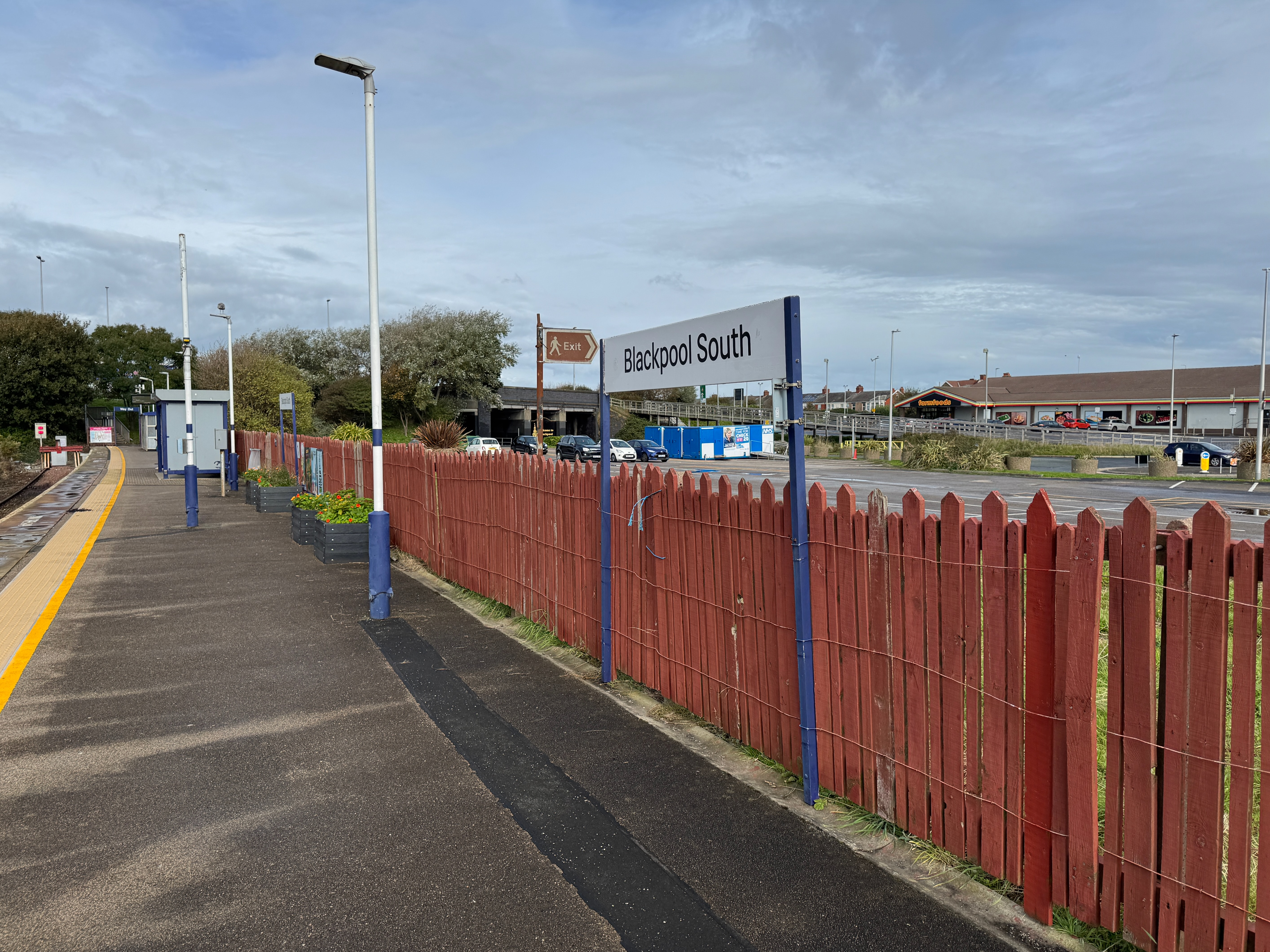
Waiting shelters are located close to the station's entrance

The station is unstaffed and only has basic amenities, namely two waiting shelters. A touch-screen ticket vending machine and timetable poster boards are available on the platform. Train information is provided via a digital CIS display and automated announcements. Step-free access is available via ramps from Waterloo Road and the car park. A regular bus service can be caught to Halfway House or Victoria Hospital on the number 5 and to Blackpool town centre on the numbers 11 and 68. The 68 also heads to Preston, whilst the 11 goes to Lytham and St Anne's-on-the-Sea.

The waiting shelter was burned down by vandals in 2012.

== Service ==
The typical off-peak service from the station is:

- 1 train per hour to Preston.

Preceding station	National Rail	Following station
Terminus	Northern Trains Blackpool South Branch Line	Blackpool Pleasure Beach
	Disused railways	
Blackpool Central	Preston and Wyre Joint Railway; Marton Line 1903–1965	Kirkham & Wesham
	Historical railways	
Blackpool Central	Blackpool and Lytham Railway	Lytham Road

== See also ==
- Public transport in the Fylde
