= Kirkham and Wesham railway station =

Railway station in Lancashire, England

Kirkham and Wesham
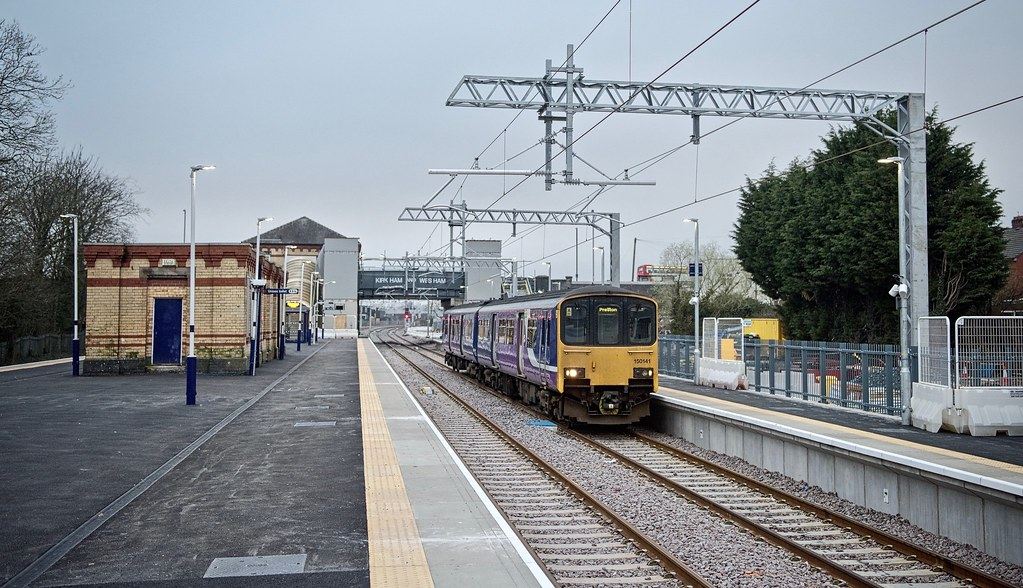
- The station during electrification upgrade works in 2018

General information
- Location: Kirkham, Fylde, England
- Coordinates: 53.7868°N 2.8823°W
- Grid reference: SD419326
- Manager: Northern Trains
- Platforms: 3

Other information
- Station code: KKM
- Classification: DfT category E

History
- Original company: Preston and Wyre Joint Railway
- Pre-grouping: Lancashire and Yorkshire Railway & London and North Western Railway (joint)
- Post-grouping: London Midland and Scottish Railway

Key dates
- 16 July 1840: Opened as Kirkham
- 1890: Rebuilt
- 1906/7: Renamed Kirkham and Wesham

Passengers
- 2020/21: ▼83,240
- Interchange: 799
- 2021/22: ▲0.269 million
- Interchange: ▲4,560
- 2022/23: ▲0.315 million
- Interchange: ▲22,264
- 2023/24: ▲0.361 million
- Interchange: ▼5,878
- 2024/25: ▲0.398 million
- Interchange: ▲6,044
Location
Notes
- Passenger statistics from the Office of Rail and Road

Kirkham and Wesham railway station serves the towns of Kirkham and Wesham, in Lancashire, England. It is managed by Northern Trains, which operates most of the passenger services that call there.

== History ==
The station, opened in 1840, was originally located to the west of Station Road and named Kirkham. In 1890, it was rebuilt on the east side of the road and later renamed Kirkham and Wesham. Historically the Wrangway Brook, beside which the railway was laid, has always been the boundary between Kirkham and Wesham; the station buildings are all situated in Kirkham.

Two tracks were built on the northern side of the line for a platform that was planned, but never built due to the outbreak of World War II.

Kirkham station signalbox, which was located in between the up and down fast lines, was demolished during resignalling operations in 1977.

To the west of the station, Kirkham North Junction is where the suburban branch line to Blackpool South follows the Fylde coast through Lytham, Ansdell and Fairhaven, St Annes-on-Sea; the main line to Blackpool North proceeds via Poulton-le-Fylde. Between 1903 and 1965, there was a third express line, the Marton Line, which went straight to Blackpool South and beyond to Blackpool Central. This junction involved a flyover to allow Preston-bound trains to access the up fast line from the Marton line; it closed in 1965, but the disused flyover bridge was not removed until the 1980s.

There were originally two platforms, but work in 2017 and 2018 added a third. There are signs of the former size of the station in the form of disused sidings areas and blocked-off arches. Originally a cast iron and glass roof covered the platforms, similar to that at Poulton-le-Fylde; this was removed in the 1960s. In 2018, lifts were also installed.

Fast lines used to run from Kirkham North Junction (located a half a mile to the west of the station) to what was known as Kirkham South Junction - just east of the station, allowing through trains to pass without running beside the platforms. These were the last vestige of the four track which originally started at Preston and were removed during remodelling work in 2017, to allow for a third platform and a faster alignment of the remaining and new lines As part of the works, all of the disused sidings were removed.

The signalbox at Kirkham North Junction was opened in 1903; it had over 70 levers, worked by two signalmen and a train recorder. A framed summary in the box detailed the total number of train movements there in a 24-hour period in July 1936 as 656; the vast majority of these would have been connected with the Blackpool holiday trade.

In March 2011, the station was given a makeover with modernisation and refurbishment of the staircase. In 2017-2018, the station was given a major refurbishment as part of the electrification programme.

=== Electrification and rebuild ===
As part the Great North Rail Project and Northern Powerhouse Rail, the line from Manchester to Blackpool North was approved by the government for electrification.

The opportunity was taken to completely renew the signalling of the line, as well as rebuilding and improving stations along the line. The plans have seen the track layout remodelled, the non-platform lines removed, a third platform added, the footbridge rebuilt including new lifts, new signalling installed and the route from Preston-Blackpool North electrified. The work at the station started in mid-2017, with a total blockade from Preston to Blackpool North and South starting in November 2017 and completed in April 2018. The station reopened with service to Blackpool South on 29 January 2018, but reopening of the line to Blackpool North was pushed back to 16 April 2018, as a result of bad weather and maintenance issues with one of the infrastructure trains being used in the upgrade works. The signalbox itself closed in November 2017.

== Facilities ==
The station has a street-level ticket office, which is staffed throughout the week (06:40–17:45 Mondays to Saturdays, 09:00–16:15 Sundays). A self-service ticket machine has also been installed for use when the booking office is closed or to collect pre-paid tickets. Waiting shelters are in place at platform level, along with digital CIS displays and timetable posters.

Lifts were installed as part of the Preston to Blackpool electrification scheme, providing step-free access to the platforms.

== Services ==
The station is served by two train operating companies. As of May 2025, the following general service pattern is provided in trains per hour/week:

Northern Trains:

- 3tph to Blackpool North, all of which call at Poulton-le-Fylde and one of which calls at Layton (2tph on Sundays)
- 1tph to Blackpool South, calling at all stations
- 2tph to Manchester Airport, via Bolton (1tph on Sundays)
- 1tph to York, via the Calder Valley line (except Sundays)
- 1tph to Preston
- 1tph to Liverpool Lime Street (late evenings only).

Avanti West Coast:

- 1tpw (Sundays) to Preston.

Preceding station	National Rail	Following station
Poulton-le-Fylde	Avanti West Coast Blackpool North branch line Limited service, Sundays only	Preston
Poulton-le-Fylde	Northern Trains Blackpool North to Manchester Airport	Preston
Poulton-le-Fylde	Northern Trains Blackpool North to Liverpool Lime Street Monday to Saturday	Preston
Poulton-le-Fylde	Northern Trains Blackpool North to York Sunday only	Preston
Moss Side	Northern Trains Blackpool South branch line	Salwick Limited service
Moss Side	Northern Trains Blackpool South branch line	Preston
	Historical railways	
Singleton	Preston and Wyre Joint Railway; Fleetwood Branch Line; Blackpool (N) Branch Line	Salwick
Blackpool South	Preston and Wyre Joint Railway; Marton Line 1903–1965	Salwick
Wrea Green	Preston and Wyre Joint Railway; Lytham Branch Line	Salwick

== See also ==
- Public transport in the Fylde
- Railway Hotel, located across Station Road.
