= St Annes-on-the-Sea railway station =

Railway station in Lancashire, England

St Annes-on-the-Sea
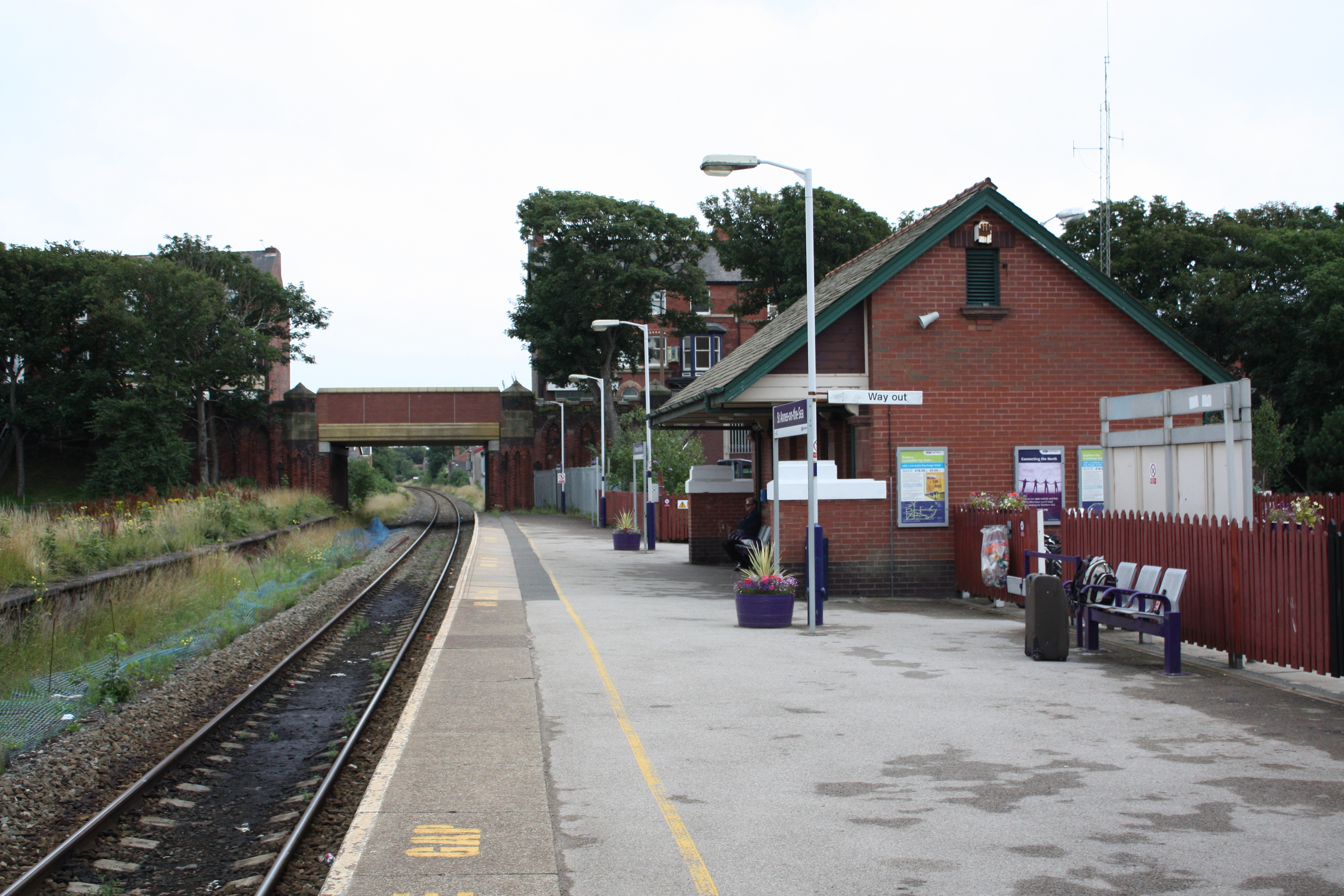

General information
- Location: St Annes-on-the-Sea, Fylde, England
- Coordinates: 53.7531°N 3.0290°W
- Grid reference: SD322290
- Managed by: Northern Trains
- Platforms: 1

Other information
- Station code: SAS
- Classification: DfT category E

History
- Original company: Blackpool and Lytham Railway
- Pre-grouping: Lancashire and Yorkshire Railway & London and North Western Railway (joint)
- Post-grouping: London Midland and Scottish Railway

Key dates
- 6 April 1863: Opened as Cross Slack
- November 1873: Relocated
- January 1875: Renamed St Annes-on-the-Sea
- 1925: Rebuilt
- 1985: Rebuilt again

Passengers
- 2020/21: ▼34,144
- 2021/22: ▲118,662
- 2022/23: ▲133,022
- 2023/24: ▲142,710
- 2024/25: ▲147,988
Location
Notes
- Passenger statistics from the Office of Rail and Road

St Annes-on-the-Sea railway station serves the area of St Annes-on-the-Sea, commonly known as St Annes, in Lytham St Annes, Lancashire, England. It is a stop on the Blackpool South branch line to Preston, sited 3 1/4 miles (5.2 km) south-south-east of Blackpool South.

== History ==
The first station to serve the area was opened in 1863, as Cross Slack. It was resited to the present station, which opened on 1 November 1873 It was renamed St Annes-on-the-Sea two years later.

The up platform was decommissioned in 1986, which is still visible, when the line from Kirkham and Wesham was reduced to single track; the line west of here had previously been singled in May 1982 and most of the station was demolished. A new smaller building was erected to house a ticket office, staffed on a part-time basis, which was opened officially in September 1986 by British Rail's area passenger manager.

== Facilities ==
The station has a ticket office, which is staffed from the morning peak until early afternoon, six days per week. At other times, tickets can be purchased from a vending machine on the platform side of the ticket office. Train running information is available via digital display screens, telephone and timetable posters. There is a waiting shelter and bench seating on the platform. Step-free access is available from the adjacent street.

== Services ==
The typical off-peak service operated by Northern Trains in trains per hour is:

- 1tph to Blackpool South
- 1tph to Preston.

Preceding station	National Rail	Following station
Squires Gate	Northern Blackpool Branch Line	Ansdell and Fairhaven
	Historical railways	
South Shore until 1913	Blackpool and Lytham Railway	Ansdell and Fairhaven
Gillett's Crossing Halt; 1913–1949	Blackpool and Lytham Railway	Ansdell and Fairhaven
Squires Gate after 1949	Blackpool and Lytham Railway	Ansdell and Fairhaven

== See also ==
- Public transport in the Fylde
