= Moss Side railway station =

Railway station in Lancashire, England

Moss Side
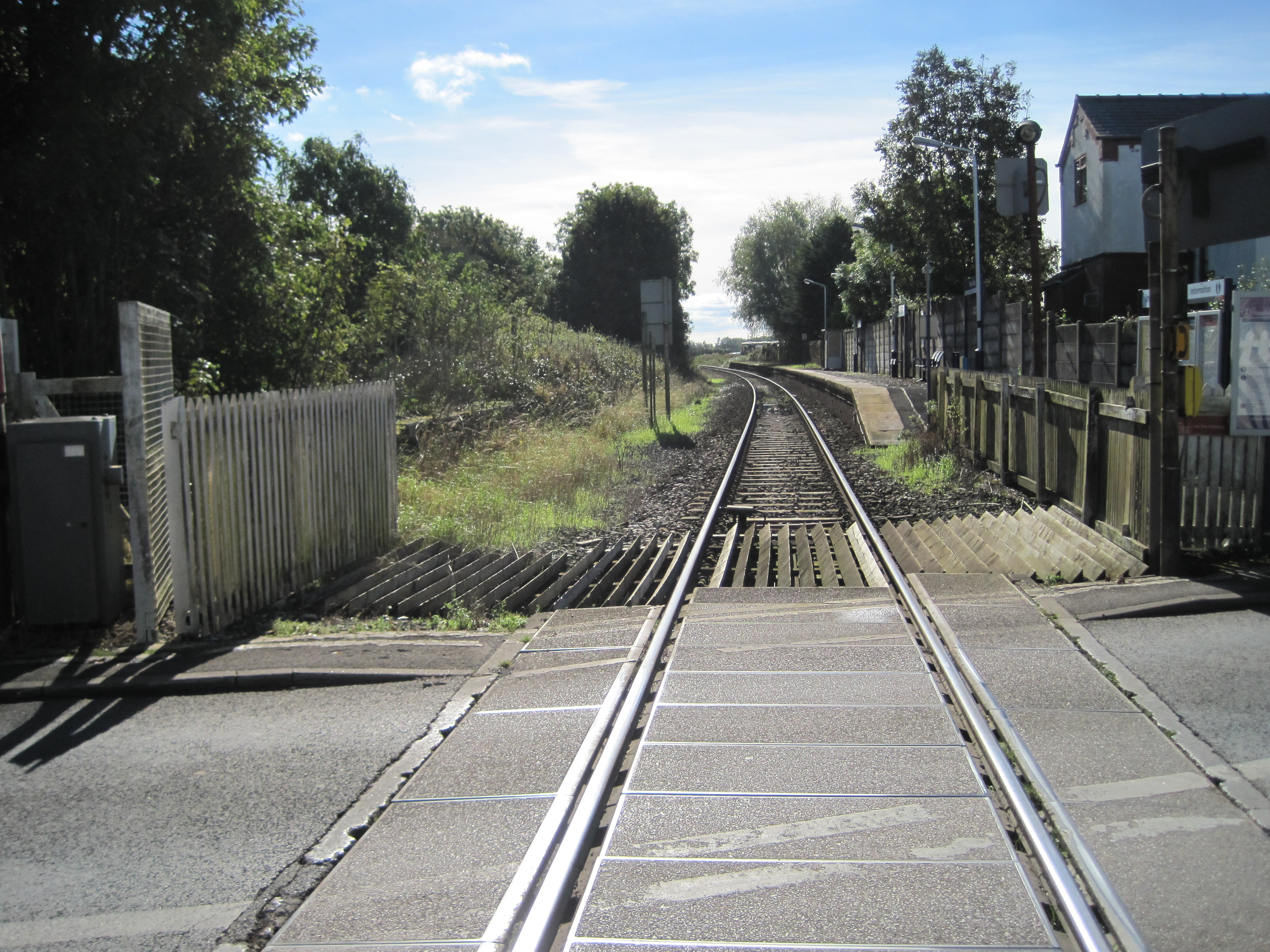

General information
- Location: Moss Side, Fylde, England
- Coordinates: 53.7649°N 2.9429°W
- Grid reference: SD379302
- Manager: Northern Trains
- Platforms: 1

Other information
- Station code: MOS
- Classification: DfT category F2

Key dates
- 16 February 1846: Opened
- 26 June 1961: Closed
- 21 November 1983: Reopened

Passengers
- 2021/22: ▲2,112
- 2022/23: ▲3,416
- 2023/24: ▲3,816
- 2024/25: ▲4,778
- 2025/26: ▲5,482
Location
Notes
- Passenger statistics from the Office of Rail and Road

Moss Side railway station serves the hamlet of Moss Side, in Lancashire, England. It is a stop on the Blackpool South branch line between Blackpool South and Preston. It is located where the B5259 road, which connects Lytham with Wrea Green, crosses the railway at a level crossing. It is managed by Northern Trains, which operates all passenger services that call there.

== History ==
When the station opened in 1846, it was called Kirkham Road.

In 1961, Moss Side station was closed, along with Wrea Green in the larger neighbouring village. It was an easy task to reopen the station as the platforms had not been removed after closure, unlike at Wrea Green. Moss Side station was reopened in 1983, with the aid of a grant from Lancashire County Council.

The old station signal box was closed in the same year that the crossing over Lytham Road was automated, with the track being singled three years later. All trains now use the old eastbound platform, with the other still extant but overgrown.

== Facilities ==
Facilities here are basic, with a waiting shelter, timetable information board and bench seats. It is the only station on the line not to be fitted with a ticket machine to date.

The old station house is now privately owned.

== Services ==
The typical off-peak service operated by Northern Trains in trains per hour is:

- 1tph to Blackpool South
- 1tph to Preston.

Preceding station	National Rail	Following station
Lytham	Northern Blackpool South Branch Line	Kirkham and Wesham
	Disused railways	
Lytham (Station Road)	Preston and Wyre Joint Railway; Lytham Branch Line (until 1874)	Wrea Green
Lytham (Ballam Road)	Blackpool and Lytham Railway (after 1874)	Wrea Green

== See also ==
- Public transport in the Fylde
