= Lytham (Station Road) railway station =

Former railway station in England

Lytham

General information
- Location: Lytham St Annes, Fylde; England
- Coordinates: 53.7384°N 2.9566°W
- Grid reference: SD370273
- Platforms: 2

Other information
- Status: Disused

History
- Original company: Preston and Wyre Joint Railway

Key dates
- 16 February 1846: Station opened
- 1 July 1874: Closed to passengers
- 1963: Closed to goods
Location

The original Lytham railway station was the Lytham terminus of a branch of the Preston and Wyre Joint Railway from Kirkham in Lancashire, England. It opened, along with the branch, on 16 February 1846; the road it was located in became known as Station Road. It was built in a Renaissance style from Longridge stone. A branch was also built to the dock at Lytham Pool.

In 1863, the Blackpool and Lytham Railway opened a separate line to its own station in Ballam Road, Lytham.

By 1874, both lines were owned jointly by the Lancashire and Yorkshire Railway and the London and North Western Railway. Ballam Road station was rebuilt as a through station and a connecting line was built to join the other line east of Lytham. The original station in Station Road was then closed to passengers, but continued to be used as a goods station until 1963.

A fire station now occupies the site.

Preceding station	Disused railways	Following station
Terminus	Preston and Wyre; Joint Railway; Lytham Branch Line	Moss Side
