= Fairhaven station =

Fairhaven station may refer to:

- Ansdell and Fairhaven railway station in Lancashire, England, United Kingdom
- Fairhaven Station in Bellingham, Washington, United States
