= Gillett's Crossing Halt railway station =

Railway station in Lancashire, England

Gillett's Crossing Halt

General information
- Location: St. Annes, Fylde; England
- Coordinates: 53.7623°N 3.0404°W
- Grid reference: SD315300
- Platforms: 2

Other information
- Status: Disused

History
- Original company: Preston and Wyre Joint Railway
- Pre-grouping: Preston and Wyre Joint Railway
- Post-grouping: London, Midland and Scottish Railway

Key dates
- 1 October 1913: Station opened
- 1 October 1915: Temporarily closed
- August 1919: Reopened
- 11 September 1939: Closed
Location

Gillett's Crossing (also known as Gillett's Crossing St Annes and Gillett's Crossing Old Links) was a halt on the Fylde Coast railway line, in Lancashire, England. It opened on 1 October 1913 for the newly introduced railmotor service. It closed on 11 September 1939.

Preceding station	Disused railways	Following station
Burlington Road Halt until 1931	Blackpool and Lytham Railway	St Annes-on-the-Sea
Squires Gate from 1931	Blackpool and Lytham Railway	St Annes-on-the-Sea
