= Wrea Green railway station =

Former railway station in England

Wrea Green
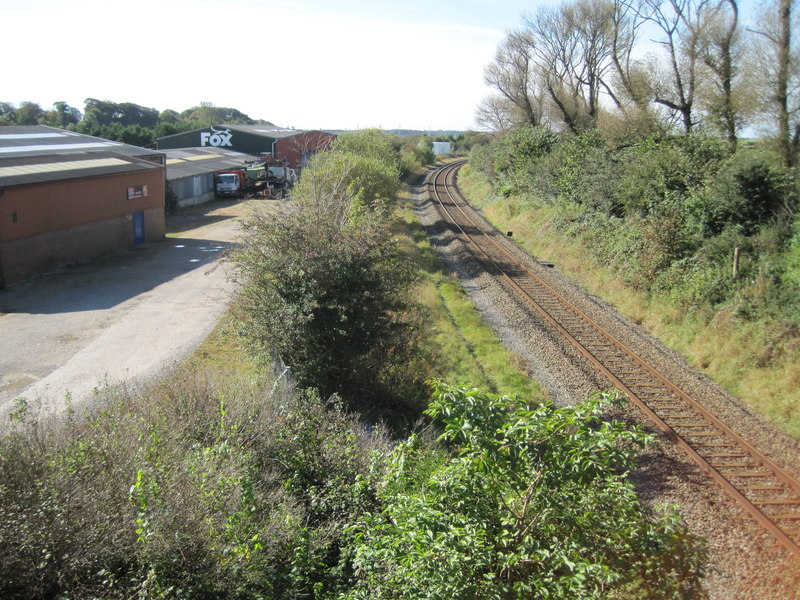
- Site of the former station (2012)

General information
- Location: Wrea Green, Fylde; England
- Coordinates: 53.7790°N 2.9184°W
- Grid reference: SD 3957 3179
- Platforms: 2

Other information
- Status: Disused

History
- Original company: Preston and Wyre Joint Railway
- Pre-grouping: Lancashire and Yorkshire Railway / London and North Western Railway
- Post-grouping: London, Midland and Scottish Railway

Key dates
- 16 February 1846: Opened
- 26 June 1961: Closed
Location

Wrea Green railway station was on the Blackpool South-to-Kirkham line. It served the village of Wrea Green, Lancashire, England, and closed in 1961.

The station opened in 1846. A single-track line to Lytham branched off the Kirkham-to-Poulton line at right angles, heading south-south-west to Wrea Green.

When the line was connected to the Blackpool and Lytham Railway in 1874, the line was doubled and the corner between Kirkham and Wrea Green was cut by a new southwesterly line.

Preceding station	Disused railways	Following station
Moss Side	Preston and Wyre Joint Railway; Lytham Branch Line	Kirkham & Wesham
