= Yeadon Way =

Road in Blackpool, Lancashire, England

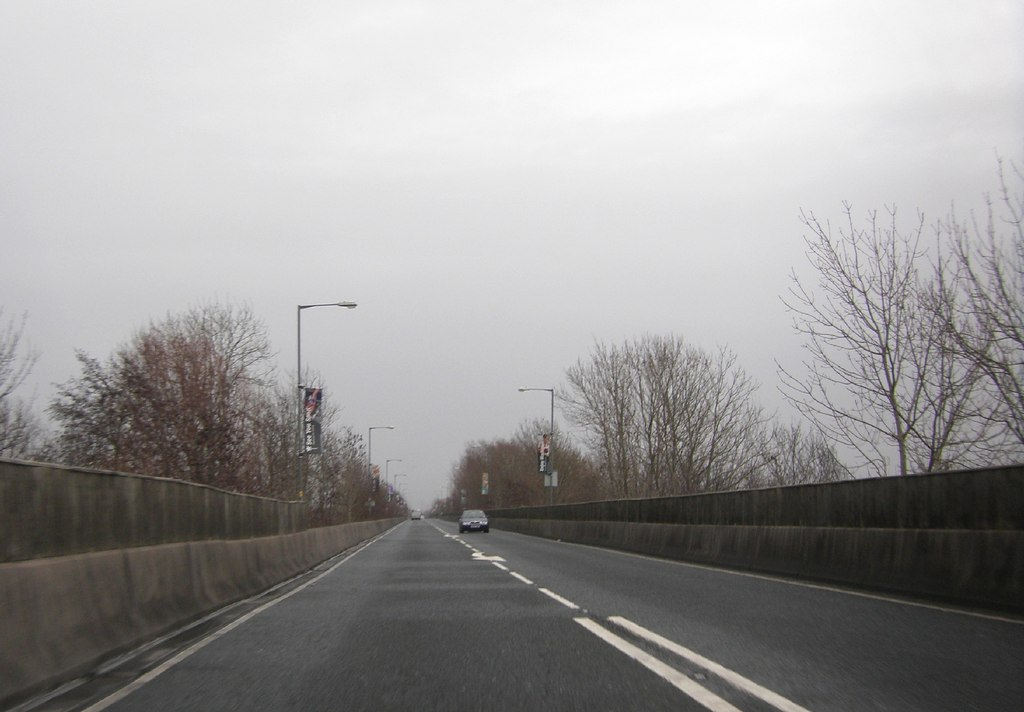
- A section of Yeadon Way to the west of Hawes Side Lane (2011)
- Interactive map of Yeadon Way
- Location: Blackpool, Lancashire
- Coordinates: 53.793°N 3.019°W
- East end: A5230/Ashworth Road
- West end: Seasiders Way/Parkinson Way

Yeadon Way is a major road in Blackpool, Lancashire, England. Along with the A583 Preston New Road, it is one of the busiest routes in and out of Blackpool to and from the southeast. It replaced the route of the central branch of the railway leading to and from Blackpool Central railway station, which was demolished in 1973. Yeadon Way was constructed during the following decade.

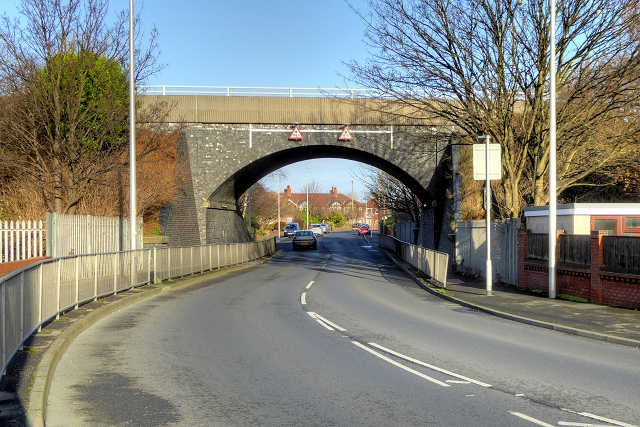
Hawes Side Lane passing beneath Yeadon Way

The road, which carries an average of 12,000 vehicles daily, begins at a roundabout shared with the A5230 and Ashworth Road, a short distance west of the end of the M55, and continues due west through the industrial areas to the south of Blackpool town centre. It passes over Chapel Road, Whalley Lane, Vicarage Lane, Hawes Side Lane (the B5261) and St Anne's Road. Beside Watson Road Park, it turns north as it heads towards Blackpool South railway station.

It terminates to the east of Blackpool Central Car Park, at a roundabout shared with Parkinson Way and Seasiders Way, the latter named for Blackpool F.C., whose Bloomfield Road stadium is located around 0.5 miles (0.80 km) to the north.

In 2019, the road was closed between Hawes Side Lane and its originating roundabout, to permit the second phase of upgrade work begun in 2015. It reopened in May 2020.

Yeadon Way is named for Harry Yeadon, a former civil engineer for Lancashire County Council.
