= Blackpool branch lines =

Railway lines in Lancashire, England

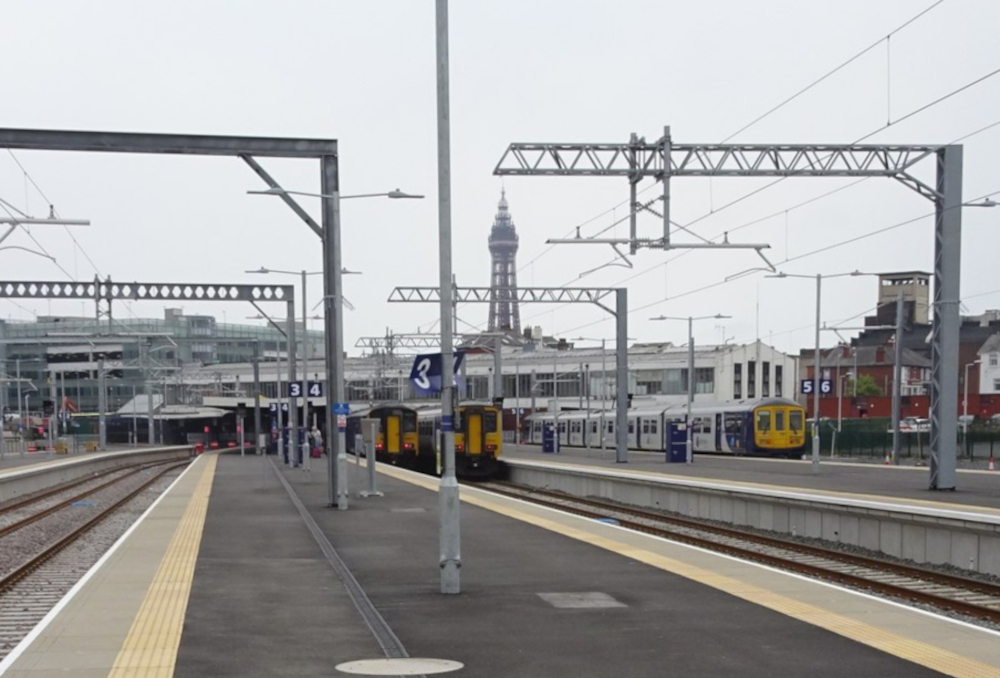
- Blackpool North railway station, the main station in Blackpool

Overview
- Status: Operational
- Owner: Network Rail
- Locale: Lancashire; North West England
- Termini: Preston; Blackpool North/South
- Stations: 13

Service
- System: National Rail
- Operator: Northern Trains
- Rolling stock: Class 150; Class 156; Class 158; Class 195; Class 331; Class 390; Class 805; Class 807

Technical
- Track gauge: 1,435 mm (4 ft 8 1/2 in) standard gauge
Route map
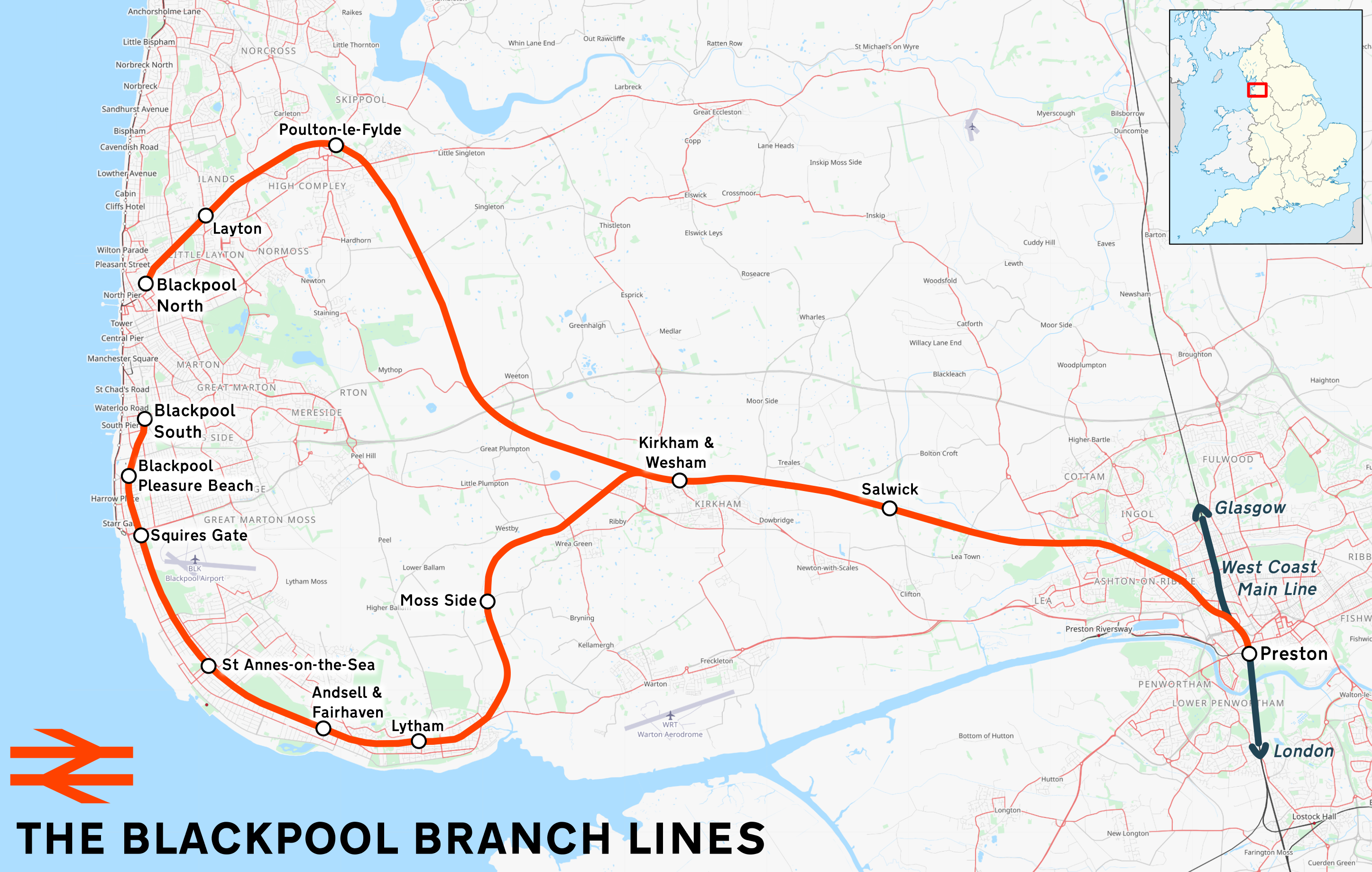

The Blackpool branch lines are two railway lines running from the West Coast Main Line at Preston to Blackpool. The main branch, which is double-tracked and electrified, runs to Blackpool North station via Poulton-le-Fylde. A second branch, which is single-tracked and non-electrified, diverges from the main branch at Kirkham and Wesham junction, running on a southerly route to Blackpool South station via Lytham.

The Preston–to–Blackpool North route was resignalled and electrified with overhead wires at 25kV AC; electric trains ran from the May 2018 timetable change.

Previously, there was also a central branch running from Kirkham to Blackpool Central station; this was closed in the 1960s and the route became a road linking from the M55 known as Yeadon Way.

== History ==
=== Early development (1840s) ===
Rail connectivity to Blackpool began in the 1840s with the Preston and Wyre Joint Railway. By 1846, a branch line extended from Poulton-le-Fylde to Blackpool, boosting its growth as a resort town.

=== Later expansions (1863 onwards) ===
Blackpool Central railway station opened in 1863, with a line connecting Lytham to Kirkham in 1874, enabling through-trains from Preston.

=== Mid to late 20th century changes ===
The line from Kirkham to Blackpool South was reduced to a single track in the early 1980s, limiting its capacity. The branch ran further north into Blackpool Central until 1964. the direct line from Kirkham to Blackpool Central closed in 1965.

=== Recent developments (21st century) ===
The Preston to Blackpool North route was electrified between 2009 and 2018, enhancing service connectivity, including direct services to London Euston.

=== Proposed enhancements (2021) ===
In 2021, a proposal was made to introduce a new passing loop on the South Fylde Line to double the current hourly service frequency and test affordable electrification methods.

== Preston to Blackpool North ==
The route is used by the bulk of Blackpool's passenger trains, providing services to Manchester, Liverpool and Leeds, as well as other destinations. The planned electrification of the Manchester-to-Blackpool North route was announced in December 2009 and completed in May 2018.

Avanti West Coast runs direct services between Blackpool North and London Euston using Class 390 Pendolinos and Class 805 Everos which will be supplemented by the Class 807 Hitachi AT300 by 2024.

Northern Trains operate frequent services on the line, using British Rail Class 331s. First TransPennine Express formerly ran hourly services to Manchester Airport using Class 185 diesel multiple units, but responsibility for these passed to the new Northern franchise as from the beginning of April 2016.

== Preston to Blackpool South - South Fylde Line ==
Known as the South Fylde Line, this branch serves Lytham, St Annes and Blackpool Pleasure Beach, each with their own station. It follows the Preston to Blackpool North line as far as Kirkham Junction. Currently, one service per hour runs along this branch, with most trains running beyond Preston to Colne via the East Lancashire line (though only advertised as through-running on Sundays). The line from Kirkham to Blackpool South was reduced from double to single track during 1982/83. As there are no intermediate passing loops, only one train can use the branch at a time, meaning the route has limited capacity. Until 1964, it ran further north into Blackpool to serve Blackpool Central station.

In 2021, Fylde Council submitted a report to the Department for Transport, proposing a new passing loop which could double the frequency of the current hourly service. It also proposed that the line be used as a 'test bed' for affordable electrification of secondary railway lines.

== Kirkham to Blackpool Central ==
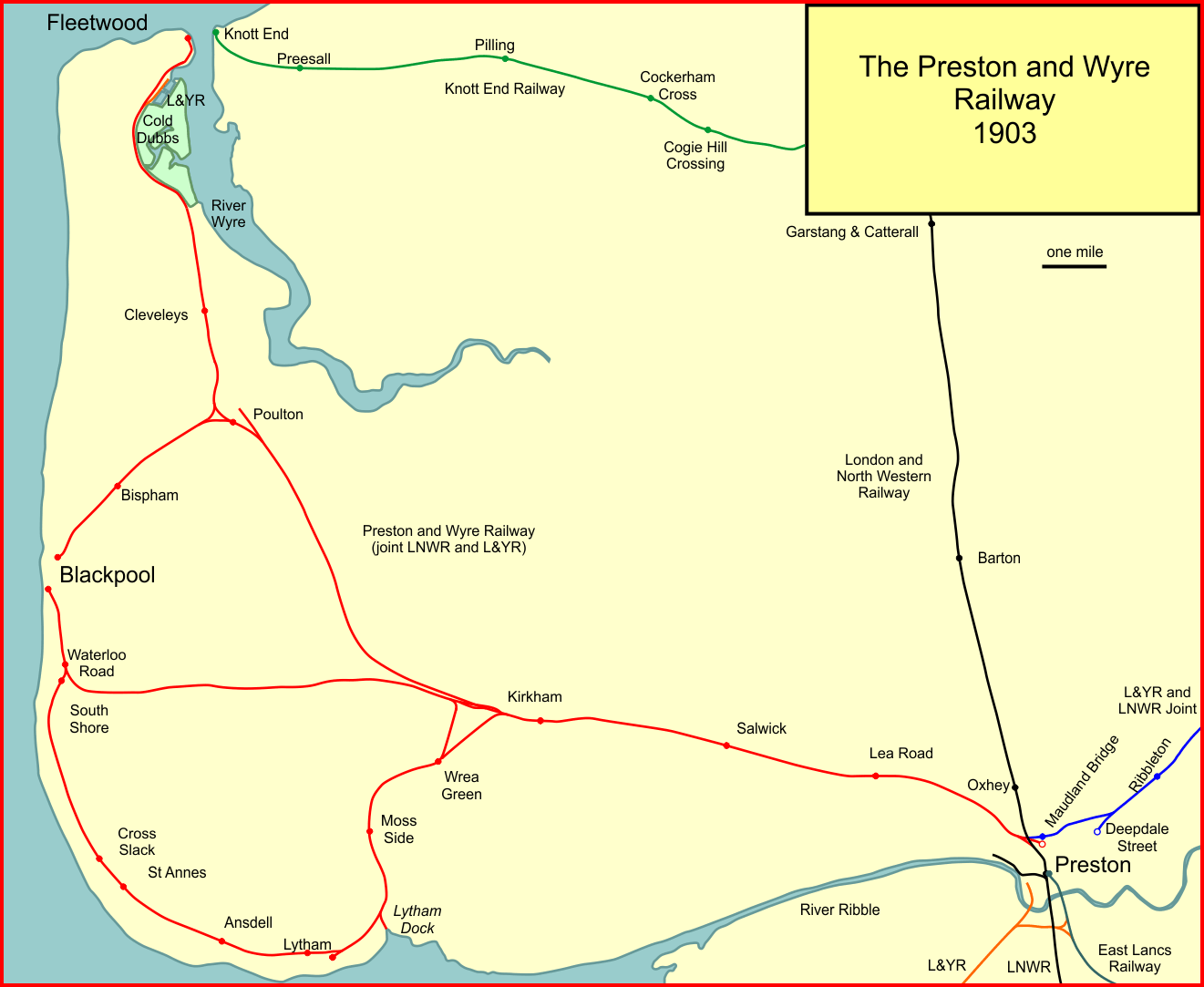
The Blackpool lines at their height in 1903. The central branch from Kirkham to Blackpool Central and the branch line from Poulton to Fleetwood are now closed.

As well as the line via Blackpool South, a flyover junction at Kirkham and Wesham provided direct access to Blackpool Central station. The so called 'New line' giving direct access from Kirkham to Blackpool Central was opened on 30 May 1903, and closed on 6 September 1965, Blackpool Central station closed at the end of 1964. Its site is now where the Central Car Park stands; the trackbed and embankment has been used for the road Yeadon Way (built in the 1980s), which provides direct access from the M55. The first two miles of the M55 also occupy the former trackbed, until the Blackpool North line travels under the motorway at the point where the lines used to merge.

== Poulton to Fleetwood ==
The Fleetwood Branch Line diverged at Poulton-le-Fylde. This served the industrial areas and ports around Fleetwood and carried passenger traffic to the town until 1970. With the exception of two small sections, the line is still in place from Poulton-le-Fylde to Jameson Road, Fleetwood, where the trackbed was used to build the A585 Amounderness Way. The junction between the branch and the mainline to Blackpool was removed in 2017.

Proposals exist to reopen the line, and volunteers of the Poulton & Wyre Railway Society have begun to clear the vegetation with which it was previously overgrown.

== See also ==
- Fleetwood Branch Line
- Preston and Wyre Joint Railway
- Public transport in the Fylde
