= Ansdell and Fairhaven railway station =

Railway station in Lancashire, England

Ansdell and Fairhaven
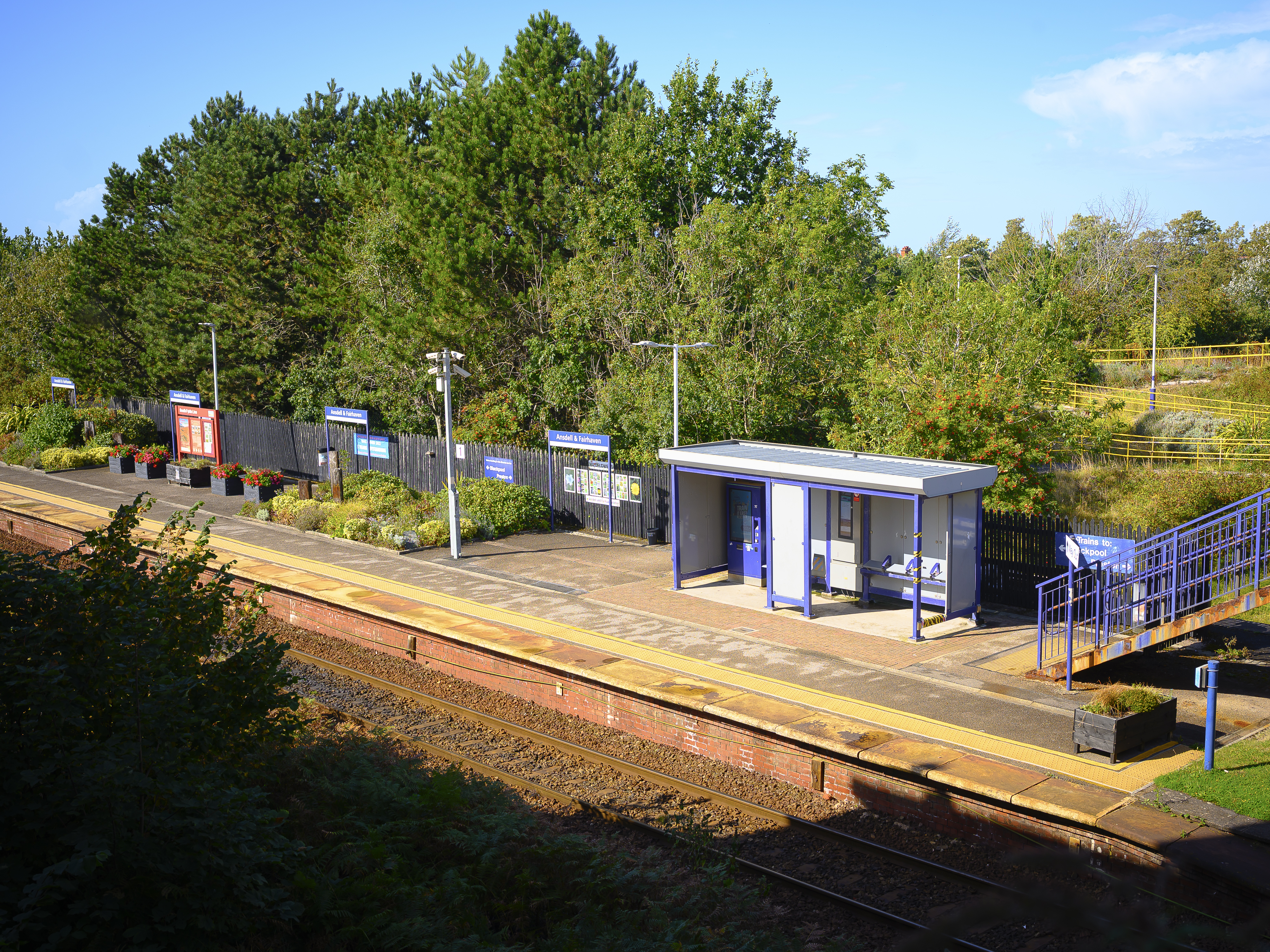
- The station in August 2025

General information
- Location: Lytham St Annes, Fylde, England
- Coordinates: 53.7416°N 2.9934°W
- Grid reference: SD345277
- Manager: Northern Trains
- Platforms: 1

Other information
- Station code: AFV
- Classification: DfT category F2

History
- Original company: Preston and Wyre Joint Railway
- Pre-grouping: Lancashire and Yorkshire Railway & London and North Western Railway (joint)
- Post-grouping: London Midland and Scottish Railway

Key dates
- 1872: Station opened as Ansdell
- 10 October 1903: Station moved 300m due west
- 25 January 1906: Station renamed Ansdell and Fairhaven

Passengers
- 2021/22: ▲35,218
- 2022/23: ▲40,982
- 2023/24: ▲45,500
- 2024/25: ▲48,776
- 2025/26: ▲55,524
Location
Notes
- Passenger statistics from the Office of Rail and Road

Ansdell and Fairhaven is a railway station that serves the areas of Ansdell and Fairhaven, in Lytham St Annes, Lancashire, England. It is a stop on the southern Blackpool branch line to Preston. In the past, it has also been known as Ansdell, Ansdell's Gate and Ansdell's Halt.

The Royal Lytham & St Annes Golf Club, host to the Open Championship, is adjacent to the station. During national and international competitions, it is used to convey spectators to the course.

== History ==
Opened by the Blackpool and Lytham Railway, then absorbed by the Preston and Wyre Joint Railway, the station joined the London, Midland and Scottish Railway during the Grouping of 1923. It then passed to the London Midland Region of British Railways on nationalisation in 1948.

When sectorisation was introduced in the 1980s, the station was served by Regional Railways until the privatisation of British Rail.

The station was set out as an island platform with tracks on both faces until the singling of the line in 1986; trains now only use the southern face. A disabled access ramp now covers the northern part of the station.

== Services ==
The typical off-peak service operated by Northern Trains in trains per hour is:

- 1tph to Blackpool South
- 1tph to Preston.

Preceding station	National Rail	Following station
St Annes-on-the-Sea	Northern Trains Blackpool South branch line	Lytham
	Historical railways	
St Annes- -on-the-Sea	Blackpool and Lytham Railway	Lytham

== See also ==
- Public transport in the Fylde
