= Lytham railway station =

Railway station in Lancashire, England

Lytham
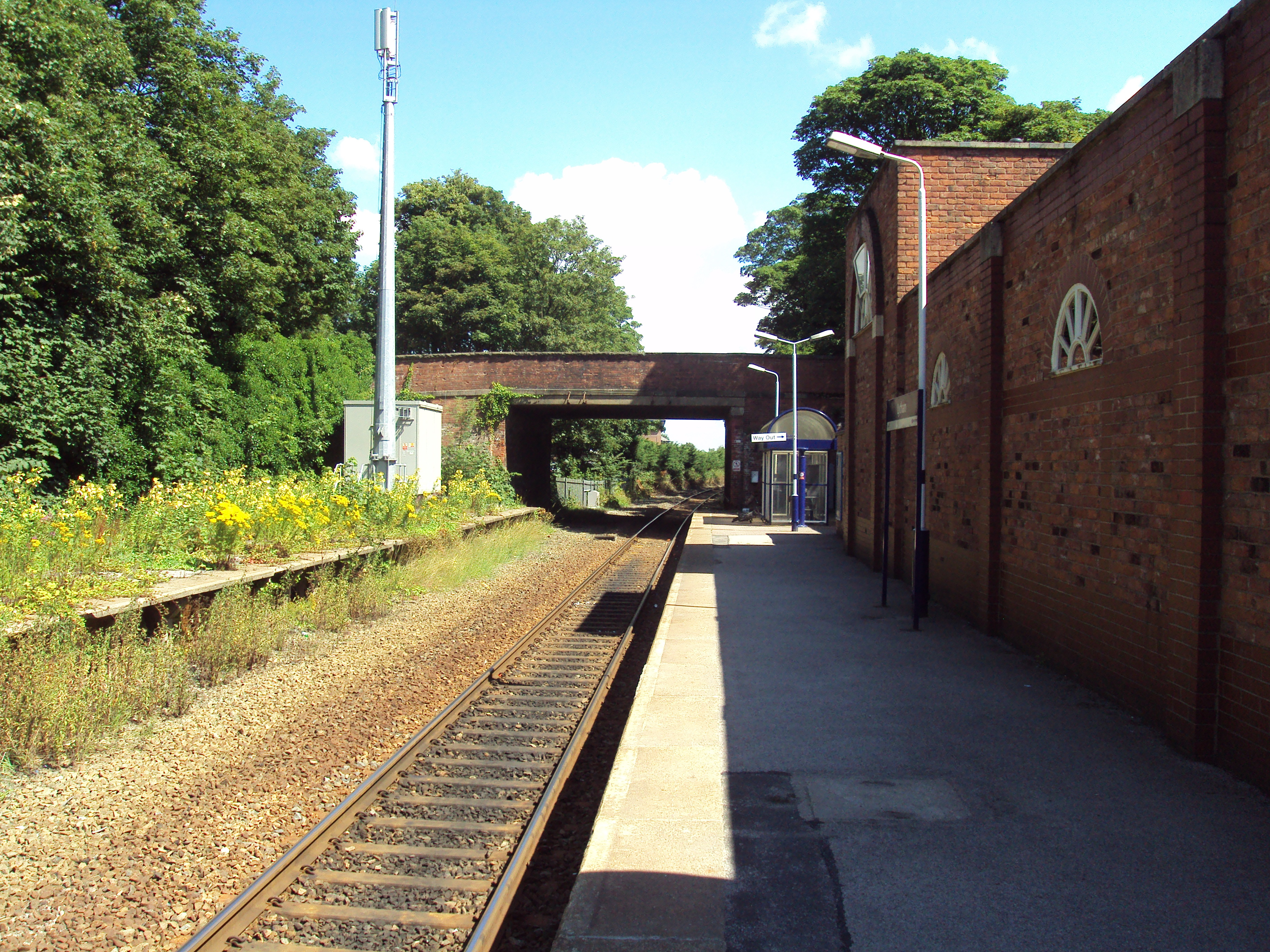

General information
- Location: Lytham St Annes, Fylde, England
- Coordinates: 53.7392°N 2.9643°W
- Grid reference: SD364274
- Managed by: Northern Trains
- Platforms: 1

Other information
- Station code: LTM
- Classification: DfT category F2

Key dates
- 6 April 1863: Opened as terminus
- 1 July 1874: Rebuilt as a through station

Passengers
- 2020/21: ▼22,620
- 2021/22: ▲96,258
- 2022/23: ▲112,652
- 2023/24: ▲119,932
- 2024/25: ▲128,104
Location
Notes
- Passenger statistics from the Office of Rail and Road

Lytham railway station serves the Lytham area of Lytham St Annes, in Lancashire, England. It is a stop on the Blackpool South branch line to Preston.

== History ==
The road name Station Road attests to the fact that the original station was about 500 metres east of the present one; a fire station now stands on the spot. The present station in Ballam Road was opened in 1863 when the separate Blackpool and Lytham Railway opened. The Ballam Road station was originally a terminus, until 1874 when it was rebuilt and the Blackpool line was extended to join the Kirkham line, at which time the Station Road station closed to passengers.

The station was host to several London, Midland and Scottish Railway camping coaches between 1935 and 1939.

The station ceased to be staffed after the cut-backs of the 1960s and the station building became derelict. In 1986, it was restored and transformed into a public house, the Station Tavern. At around the same time, the derelict sidings area was flattened and turned into a long-stay car park.

=== Accidents and incidents ===
The Lytham rail crash occurred on 3 November 1924. An express passenger train was derailed due to a broken tyre on the locomotive. Fourteen people were killed.

== Facilities ==
The station has only basic facilities: waiting shelters, bicycle stands and bench seating. It has a self-service ticket machine and public information screen. Train information can also be obtained from timetable posters and a payphone. Level access to the platform is available from the car park.

== Services ==
The typical off-peak service operated by Northern Trains in trains per hour is:

- 1tph to Blackpool South
- 1tph to Preston.

Preceding station	National Rail	Following station
Ansdell and Fairhaven	Northern Blackpool South Branch Line	Moss Side
	Historical railways	
Ansdell and Fairhaven	Blackpool and Lytham Railway	Moss Side

== See also ==
- Public transport in the Fylde
