= Blackpool North railway station =

Railway station in Lancashire, England

Blackpool North
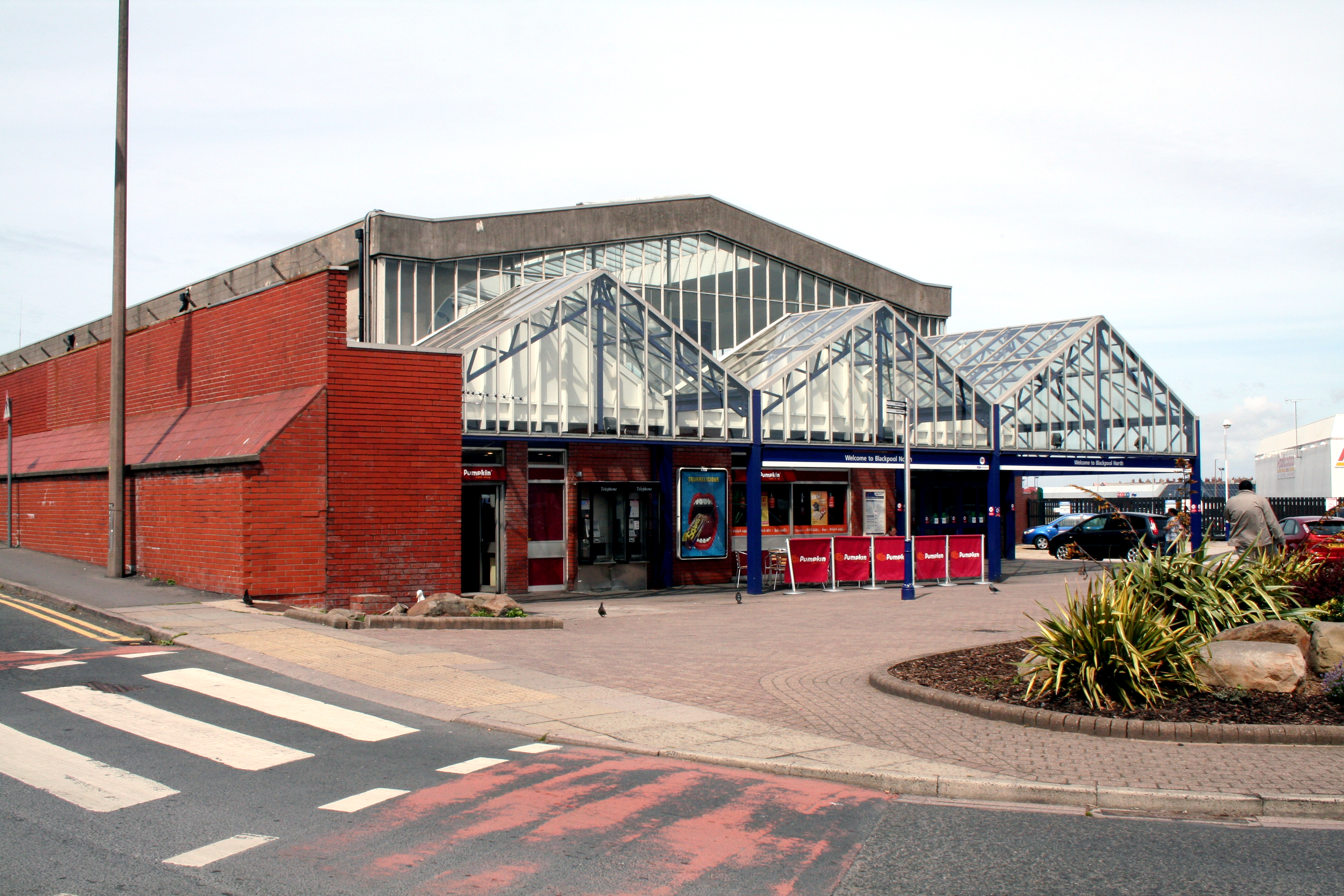
- Blackpool North station entrance

General information
- Location: Blackpool, Borough of Blackpool, England
- Coordinates: 53.8218°N 3.0493°W
- Grid reference: SD310366
- Manager: Northern Trains
- Platforms: 6

Other information
- Station code: BPN
- Classification: DfT category C1

History
- Original company: Preston and Wyre Joint Railway
- Pre-grouping: Lancashire and Yorkshire Railway & London and North Western Railway (joint)
- Post-grouping: London Midland and Scottish Railway

Key dates
- 29 April 1846: Opened as Blackpool
- 1872: Renamed Blackpool Talbot Road
- 1898: Rebuilt
- 17 March 1932: Renamed Blackpool North
- 1974: Rebuilt on site of former excursion platforms
- 16 June 2024: Tram stop opens

Passengers
- 2020/21: ▼0.535 million
- 2021/22: ▲1.782 million
- 2022/23: ▲1.909 million
- 2023/24: ▲1.973 million
- 2024/25: ▲2.066 million
Location
Notes
- Passenger statistics from the Office of Rail and Road

Blackpool North is the main railway station serving the seaside resort of Blackpool, in Lancashire, England. It is the terminus of the main Blackpool branch line and is 17 1/2 miles (28 km) north-west of Preston. There is an adjacent tram stop on the Blackpool Tramway.

It was opened in its present form in 1974 and succeeded a previous station a few hundred yards away on Talbot Road, which had first opened in 1846 and had been rebuilt in 1898. The present station is based on the 1938 concrete canopy which covered the entrance to the former excursion platforms of the old station. The town's other station, Blackpool South, facilitates services towards Preston and Colne; it does not connect to Blackpool North.

Blackpool North has regular services to Manchester Piccadilly, Liverpool Lime Street, Bolton, Wigan North Western, Preston, Blackburn, Leeds and York. There are two inter-city trains per day to London Euston.

== History ==
The first station opened on 29 April 1846 as Blackpool, renamed Blackpool Talbot Road in 1872. It was first rebuilt in 1898, consisting of two parallel train sheds and a terminal building, in Dickson Road between Talbot Road and Queen Street. Platforms 1 to 6 were located in the sheds, with a larger island between platforms 1 and 2 to accommodate taxis. In addition, there was effectively, in all but name, a separate station at the east end of Queen Street, with open excursion platforms 7 to 16, used only in summer.

The station was recommended for closure in the Beeching Report (1963), but it was Blackpool Central that was closed in 1964. Blackpool Corporation had lobbied for Central station to close instead, in order to use the site for redevelopment.

The main station buildings, train shed and platforms were decommissioned and demolished in 1974; the 1938 excursion platform canopy building was refurbished to become the new main station.

=== Former services ===
Blackpool North was on the InterCity network until 2003, when Virgin Trains West Coast and Virgin CrossCountry withdrew High Speed Train and Voyager services to London Euston and Birmingham New Street. Former local franchise holder First North Western ran services from Blackpool to London Euston, but these were soon discontinued. However, in the December 2014 timetable change, Virgin reintroduced direct services to/from London Euston, albeit only on weekdays and only one each way per day.

Virgin CrossCountry used to run up to eight services per day to Blackpool North from Portsmouth Harbour, Brighton and London Paddington. The services were introduced by Virgin to increase the frequency of the CrossCountry trains and were introduced in 2000. They were withdrawn in summer 2003 by the Strategic Rail Authority to improve the general punctuality of train services. First North Western used to operate a Monday-Saturday boat train to/from Holyhead (which attached to a portion from Stockport) until 2003 and briefly operated a service between Blackpool and London Euston.

=== Electrification ===
In November 2010, it was announced that the lines between Blackpool, Preston and Manchester would be electrified. This resulted in the semaphore signalling at the station being replaced by modern colour lights, controlled from the WCML North Rail Operating Centre in Manchester and the station track and platform layout being altered, with the eight curved platforms reduced to six and on a straighter alignment than previously. The project was due for completion by May 2016, with the line onwards to Manchester following by the end of the year. This was subsequently pushed back twice: first to March 2017 and then again to early 2018 (after contractors Balfour Beatty pulled out), so that the track remodelling and resignalling work could be carried out at the same time as the wiring, reducing disruption to passengers (as only one period of closure would be required).

The remodelling required the station to be completely closed for a significant period of time (up to 18 weeks according to Network Rail), with additional weekend and evening blocks before and after. Replacement buses to Preston operated during the closure. The station was closed until 16 April 2018 for the work to take place. A major rebuild and upgrade of the nearby carriage servicing depot was carried out at the same time. The signalbox itself closed in October 2017.

== Facilities ==
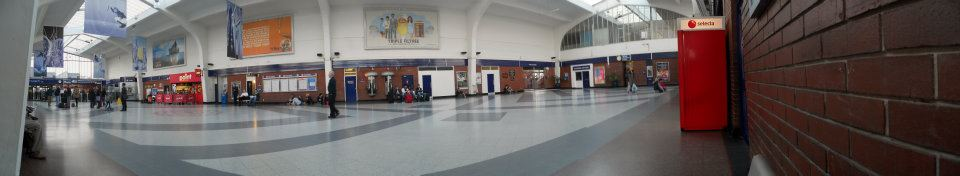
A panorama of the interior of the station

The station is staffed and open for 24 hours a day. It is equipped with payphones, vending machines, toilets and indoor seating, as well as a customer service office and a booking office. Step-free access to the station and platform is available for passengers with wheelchairs or prams, and portable ramps are also available for platform-to-train access. The station has its own covered concourse with a cafe and a convenience store. The station also has a 30-space car park and bus connections, which can also accommodate Plusbus ticket holders.

As Blackpool is a popular tourist resort, with its Pleasure Beach and beaches, there are many measures put in to prevent fare evasion, including automated barrier checks, as well as the conductors on the trains.

== Services ==
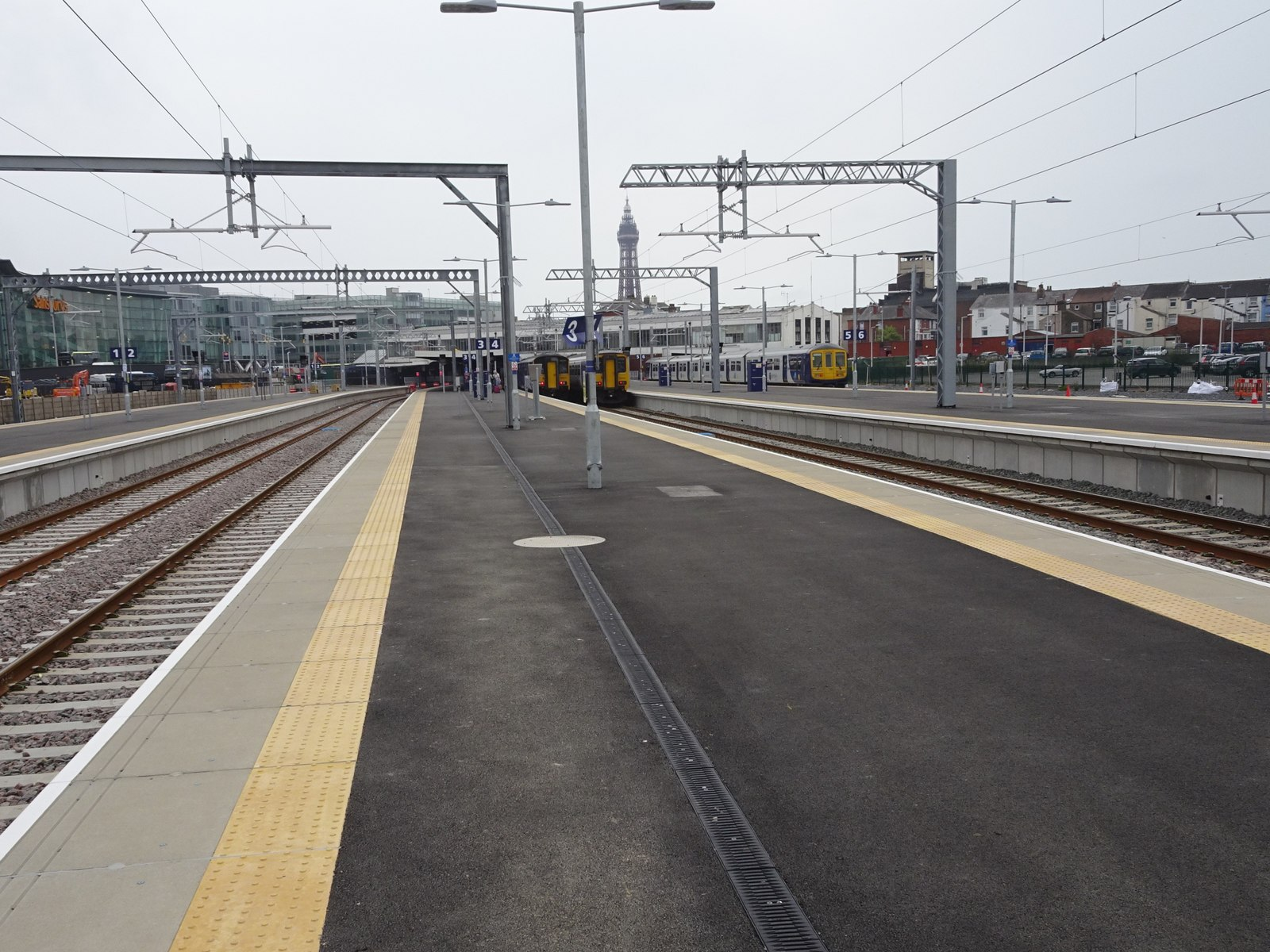
A view of the platforms in 2018; Blackpool Tower is in the background

The station is served by two train operating companies; the typical weekday service pattern in trains per hour/day is:

Northern Trains

- 1tph to Liverpool Lime Street, via Wigan North Western
- 2tph to Manchester Airport, via Manchester Piccadilly (1tph on Sundays)
- 1tph to York, via Leeds.

Avanti West Coast

- 2tpd to London Euston.

Preceding station	National Rail	Following station
Terminus	Northern Trains Blackpool North to Manchester Airport	Layton
Terminus	Northern Trains Blackpool North to Manchester Airport	Poulton-le-Fylde
Terminus	Northern Trains Blackpool North to Liverpool Lime Street	Poulton-le-Fylde
Terminus	Northern Trains Blackpool North to York	Poulton-le-Fylde
Terminus	Avanti West Coast West Coast Main Line Blackpool branch	Preston
Terminus	Avanti West Coast West Coast Main Line Blackpool branch	Poulton-le-Fylde Limited service
	Blackpool Tramway	
Talbot Square	Blackpool Tramway	North Pier
	Disused railways	
Terminus	Preston and Wyre Joint Railway; Blackpool Branch Line	Bispham

== Tram interchange ==
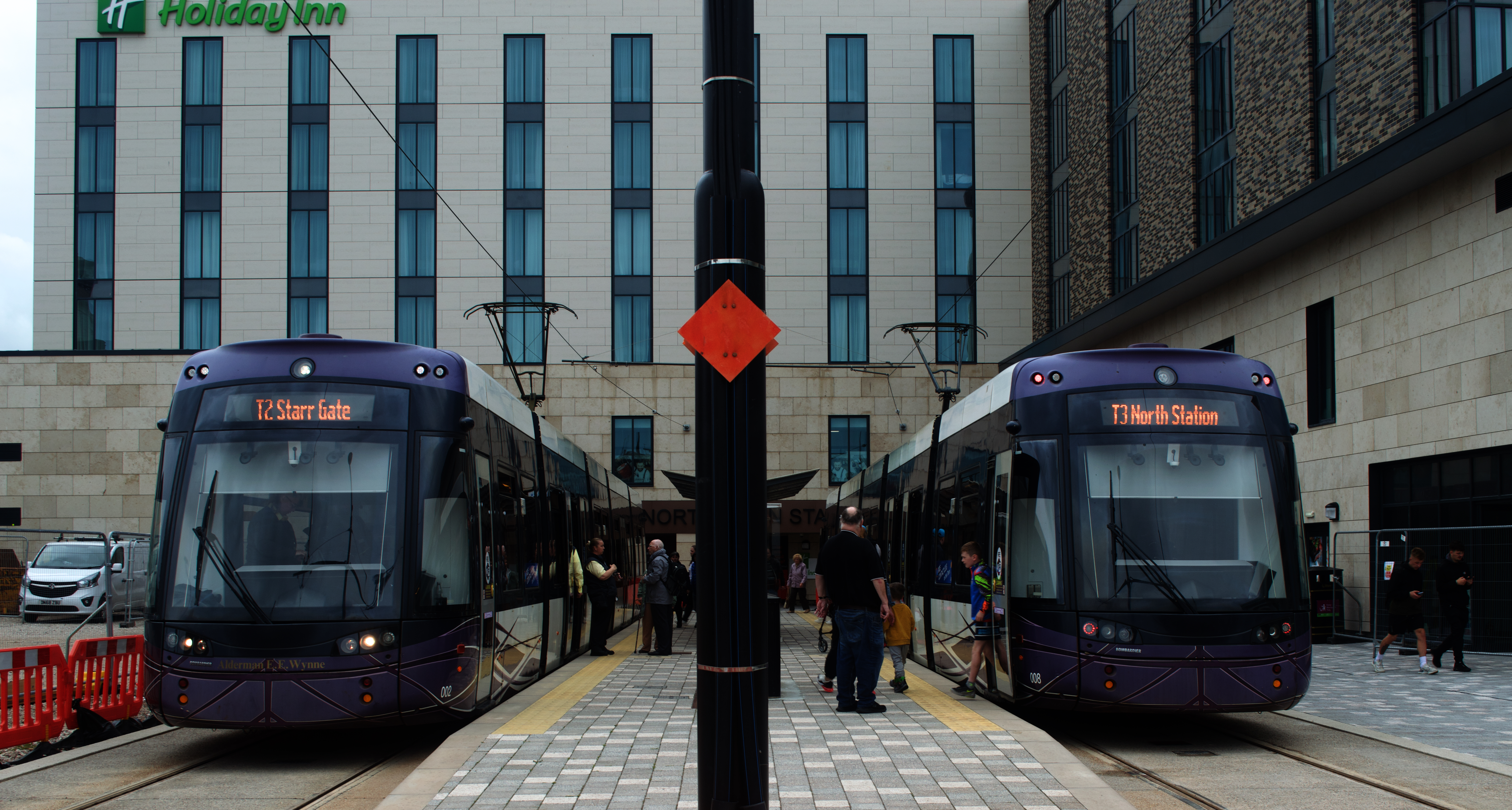
Trams at the interchange in 2024

In 2017, approval was given for the construction of a new 550-metre (1,800 ft), £21 million branch of the Blackpool Tramway from North Pier to Blackpool North station, with a new tram terminal opposite the station. This recreates the route of an earlier tramway connection to the station along Talbot Road which operated between 1902 and 1936. It means that the tramway will almost connect Blackpool's two main railway stations, as Blackpool South is a few minutes walk away from Waterloo Road tram stop.

Work on the branch began in 2018 and it was originally meant to be open in April 2019; however, completion of the branch required the demolition of a Wilko store which sat at the site of the terminus. Delays in relocating the store mean that its demolition was not completed until September 2020. A second delay came from the COVID-19 pandemic. The first test tram ran on the branch in March 2022. The first passenger service ran on 12 June 2024 as a special service, with a full service beginning four days later.

== See also ==
- Public transport in the Fylde
