= Blackpool Central railway station =

Former railway station in Lancashire, England

Blackpool Central
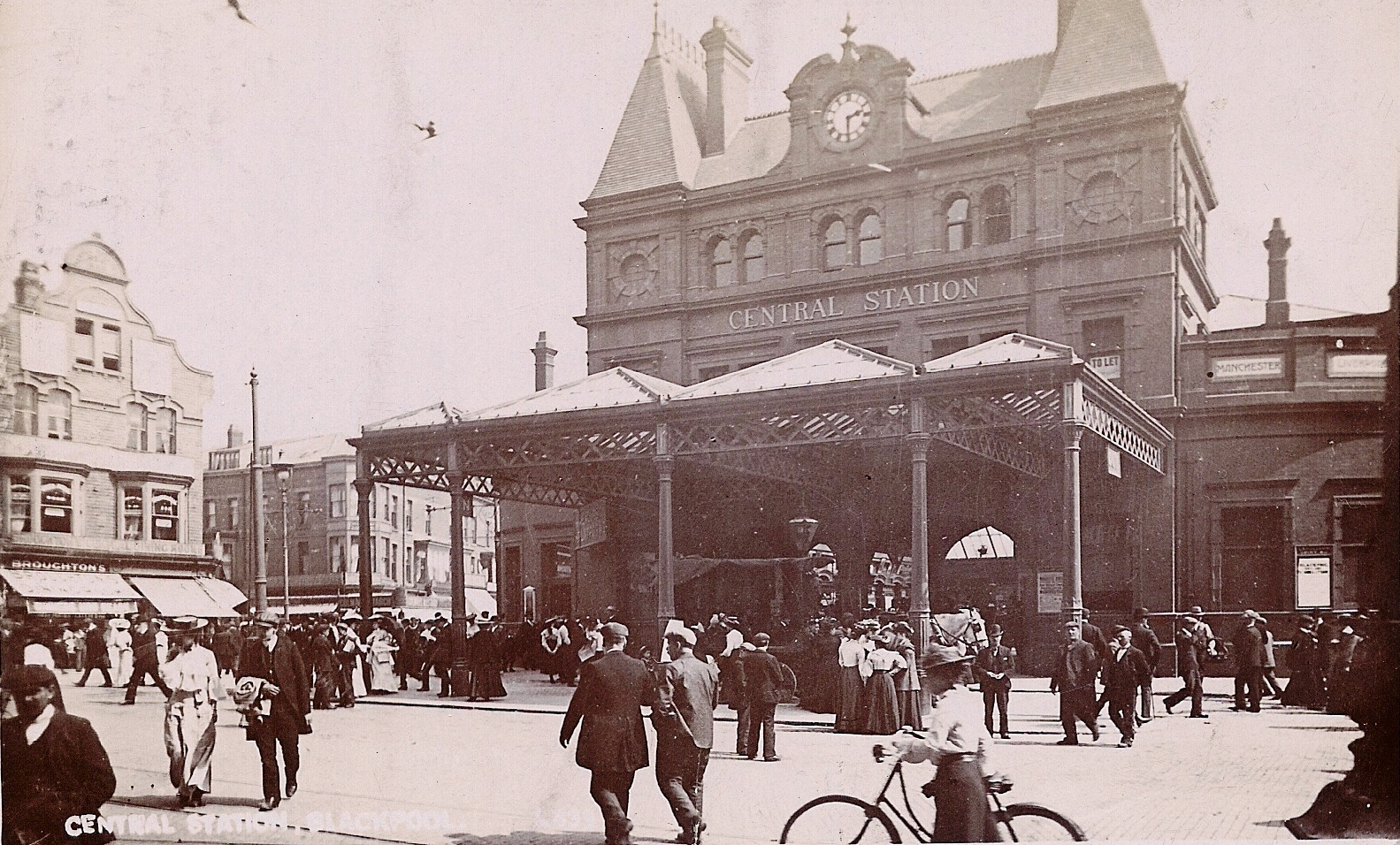
- Blackpool Central railway station in 1906

General information
- Other names: Hounds Hill (formerly)
- Location: Blackpool, Borough of Blackpool, England
- Coordinates: 53.8141°N 3.0542°W
- Platforms: 14

Other information
- Status: Disused

History
- Original company: Blackpool and Lytham Railway
- Pre-grouping: Lancashire and Yorkshire Railway / London and North Western Railway
- Post-grouping: London, Midland and Scottish Railway

Key dates
- 6 April 1863: Opened as Hounds Hill
- June 1878: Renamed Blackpool Central
- 1901: Enlarged to 14 platforms
- 2 November 1964: Closed
Location

Blackpool Central was the largest railway station in the town of Blackpool, in Lancashire, England. It had 14 platforms; at its closure in 1964, it became the station with the highest number of platforms ever to close. Principal railway services have now transferred to Blackpool North.

== History ==
The station opened on 6 April 1863 as Hounds Hill and was renamed Blackpool Central in 1878. Initially, it was a relatively small town centre terminus for an isolated line running along the south Fylde coast from Lytham. In 1874, this line was connected to another branch from Lytham to Kirkham, allowing through trains from Preston and beyond. In 1901, the station was enlarged to include 14 platforms; the same number as London Paddington in 2006. A further development came in 1903 when an additional Marton Line was added, routed directly from Preston and considerably shorter and quicker. This arrangement made for convenient and direct access to the town centre, particularly the sea front and Blackpool Tower.

Central station was the focus of Blackpool's worst incident during the Second World War. It was the base for a major flight training centre and a fighter squadron during the war. On 27 August 1941, two aircraft—a Blackburn Botha trainer and a Boulton Paul Defiant fighter—collided in mid-air over the sea, just off Blackpool's central seafront. The debris from the collision was strewn over a large area; a large part of it struck Central station, causing severe damage and killing twelve people.

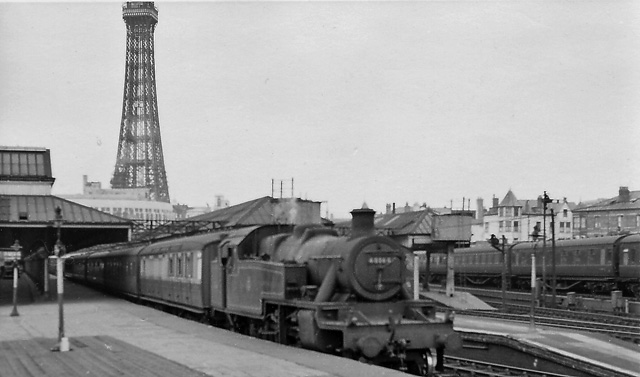
Blackpool Central station in 1959

The station remained in service just long enough to see its centenary before its closure on 2 November 1964, against the original recommendation of the 1963 Beeching report, which had proposed the closure of Blackpool North station instead. Blackpool Corporation had successfully lobbied British Railways for Central to be closed instead, in order that it might buy the land for potentially lucrative redevelopment.

Part of the site was used as a bingo hall until 1973, at which time all the station buildings were demolished. The direct Marton line from Preston, which also passed through Blackpool South, was closed in 1965, leaving a large tract of wasteland along with disused embankments and bridges.

Preceding station	Disused railways	Following station
Terminus	Preston and Wyre Joint Railway; Marton Line (from 1903)	Blackpool South
Terminus	Blackpool and Lytham Railway	Blackpool South

== The site today ==
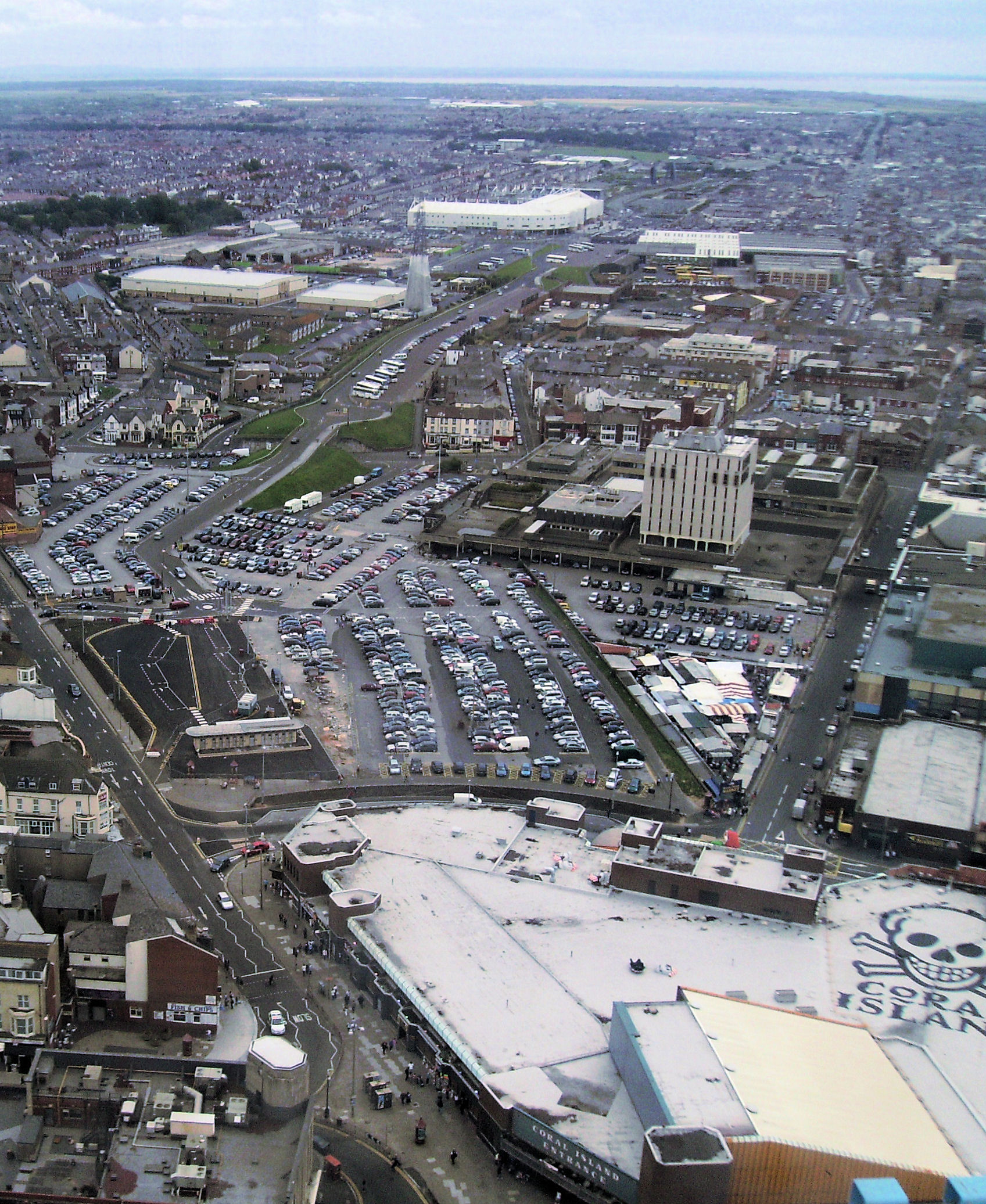
The site of the former station in 2009. The station building and platforms occupied almost all of the area in the bottom half of the picture; the route of the dismantled tracks can be seen heading towards the top right of the picture.

The land reclaimed from the station buildings became the location of some seafront amusement arcades (Coral Island), a new police station and a multi-storey car park with some residual spare land used as additional flat car parking space. In the late 1980s, the derelict track bed of the central railway line was adapted into a road, Yeadon Way, connecting the town centre with the M55 motorway. This road terminates at Blackpool Central car park, based at the site of the former platform ends and approach tracks. This area is where the Blackpool Illuminations are ceremonially switched on. The very outer wall of the car park is the last visible remnant of the 1900 building; traces of the infilled platforms can be seen in the ground of the Central car park.

A large part of the sidings, and other land formerly belonging to British Rail, were converted into a car park at about the same time as the road was completed. The toilets at the end near the promenade along with the aforementioned wall were all that remained of the station. The toilet block was demolished and replaced in 2009; an adjacent building, formerly used as a railwaymen's hostel, remains and has been converted into flats and shops.

In 2019, plans to develop a leisure-led development on the Central car park site were announced.

In 2021, Nikal Ltd and Media Invest Entertainment consulted on plans to redevelop the site into a £300m new leisure destination.

A planning application for the scheme has been submitted to Blackpool Council, which includes proposals to deliver a multi-storey car park, Heritage Quarter, public square, three indoor entertainment centres, hotel, restaurants, and additional leisure and hospitality space.
