= Preston and Wyre Joint Railway =

Historic railway in Lancashire, England

The Preston and Wyre Railway (P&WR) was built to connect Preston, on the London and North Western Railway West Coast Main Line, with the port of Fleetwood, at the mouth of the River Wyre. It opened in 1840. An associated company built the dock leading to the company, changing its name to the Preston and Wyre Railway, Harbour and Dock Company. Passenger business was more buoyant than expected, and the company built branch lines to the nascent resort of Blackpool and Lytham that opened in 1846. At that time the line was leased by the Lancashire and Yorkshire Railway and later the London and North Western Railway took a share in the lease which was later converted to outright ownership. The Preston and Wyre Railway continued to be jointly owned as the Preston and Wyre Joint Railway.

The Blackpool and Lytham Railway built a line without making any junction with the Preston and Wyre railway in 1863. In 1871 it was taken into the Preston and Wyre group. Passenger traffic in connection with steamer sailings at Fleetwood continued throughout the 19th century and fishing was important but the huge expansion of Blackpool as a holiday and trippers' destination dominated the P&WR network. There were massive peak flows of traffic on summer Saturdays to and from the industrial towns of Lancashire, Yorkshire and elsewhere. The railway carried local pleasure journeys by holidaymakers during their stay, and Blackpool to Fleetwood was a prominent route, served by a frequent railmotor service in the early 20th century.

After 1960 the railways' near-monopoly of passenger transport to Blackpool declined steeply, and Blackpool Central station was closed and the site sold for development. A revival started in 2018 when electrification of the Blackpool North line brought through trains to and from London and Manchester Airport.

== Origins ==
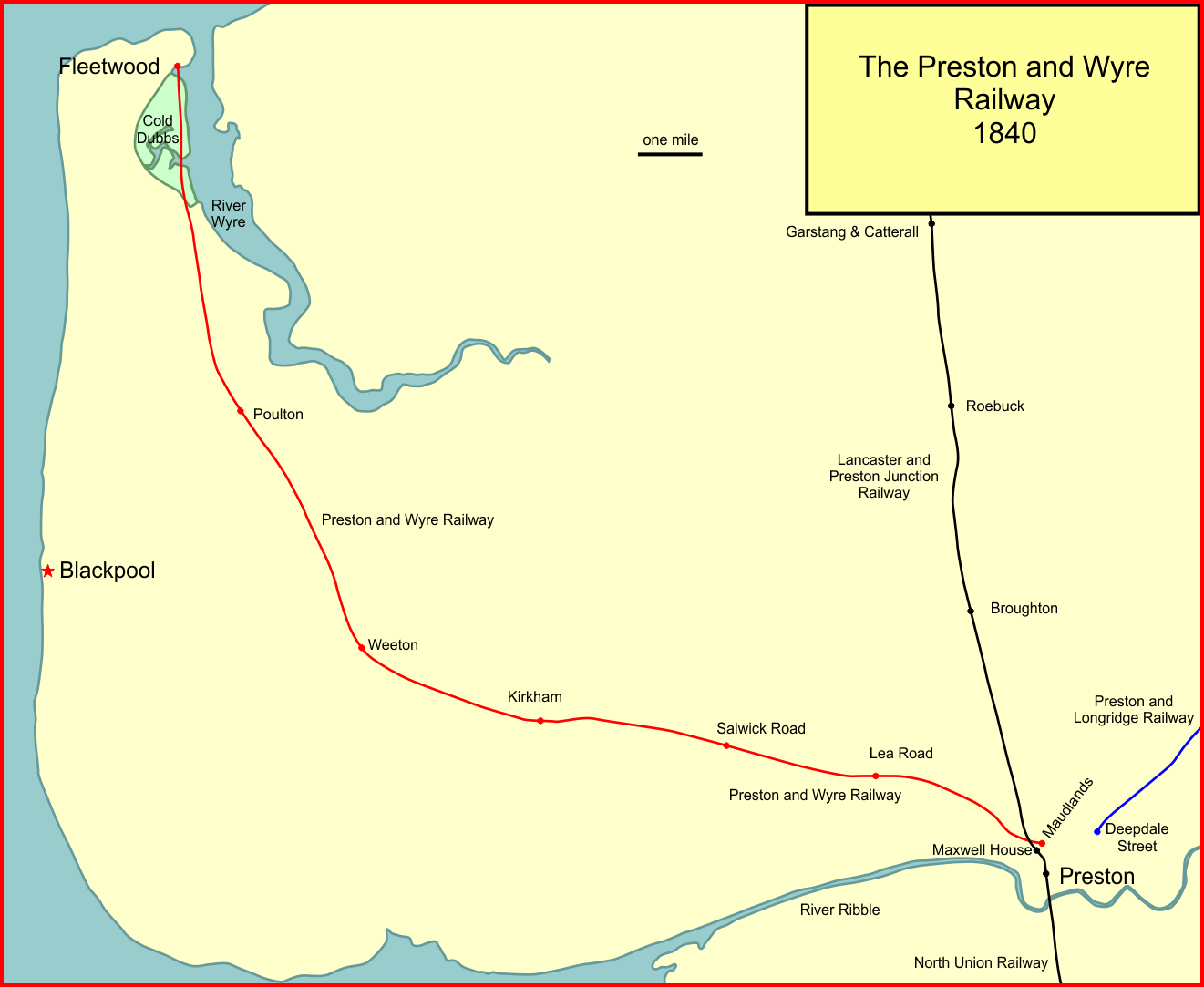
The Preston and Wyre Railway in 1840

The North Union Railway opened a line from Parkside on the Liverpool and Manchester Railway to Preston on 31 October 1838. Before that, a local line had been authorised to connect agricultural districts in the Fylde to a sea harbour in the north-west and the Lancaster Canal at the eastern end. The Fylde, north of the Ribble estuary and straddling the River Wyre, had agricultural land with rich potential, but the roads were poor and there was no harbour for shipping.

Peter Hesketh succeeded to the Rossall Hall estate in 1824 and in 1831 acquired royal authorisation to add Fleetwood to his name. He saw that the estate could be developed if a railway connection could be made to Preston and a harbour created in the sheltered estuary of the River Wyre. The harbour became Fleetwood, although at the time there was no settlement.

Preston and Wyre Railway and Harbour Act 1835
- Act of Parliament
- Parliament of the United Kingdom
- Long title: An Act for making a Railway from Preston to Wyre, and for improving the Harbour of Wyre, in the County Palatine of Lancaster.
- Citation: 5 & 6 Will. 4 c. lviii

Dates
- Royal assent: 3 July 1835

Text of statute as originally enacted

Preston and Wyre Railway and Harbour Act 1837
- Act of Parliament
- Parliament of the United Kingdom
- Long title: An Act to alter the Line of the Preston and Wyre Railway, and to amend the Act relating thereto.
- Citation: 7 Will. 4 & 1 Vict. c. xxviii

Dates
- Royal assent: 5 May 1837

Text of statute as originally enacted

On 3 July 1835 an act of Parliament, the Preston and Wyre Railway and Harbour Act 1835 (5 & 6 Will. 4 c. lviii) was passed authorising the Preston and Wyre Railway and Harbour Company with authorised capital of £130,000. Another act of Parliament, the Preston and Wyre Railway and Harbour Act 1837 (7 Will. 4 & 1 Vict. c. xxviii) of 5 May 1837 authorised a connection to the Lancaster and Preston Junction Railway which was authorised on the same day. Also authorised was access to the North Union Railway's station at Preston. A dock was considered to be essential and the company was authorised to construct docks at Fleetwood with capital of £100,000. The Preston and Wyre Dock Company constructed the dock and the two companies were combined on 1 July 1839, forming the Preston and Wyre Railway, Harbour and Dock Company. Peter Hesketh Fleetwood founded the town of Fleetwood in 1836.

== Route and opening ==
The line ran from a terminus at Dock Street on the southern part of the promontory that forms Fleetwood. (Note: There was no dock yet, but the street name existed because Hesketh's plans were already formulated.) It continued south in a straight line for two miles across tidal marshes known as Cold Dubbs where it was to be carried on embankment. The intention was to reclaim the marshes which would be contained by the embankment but engineering difficulties were encountered during construction and several sections of timber trestle viaduct were substituted.

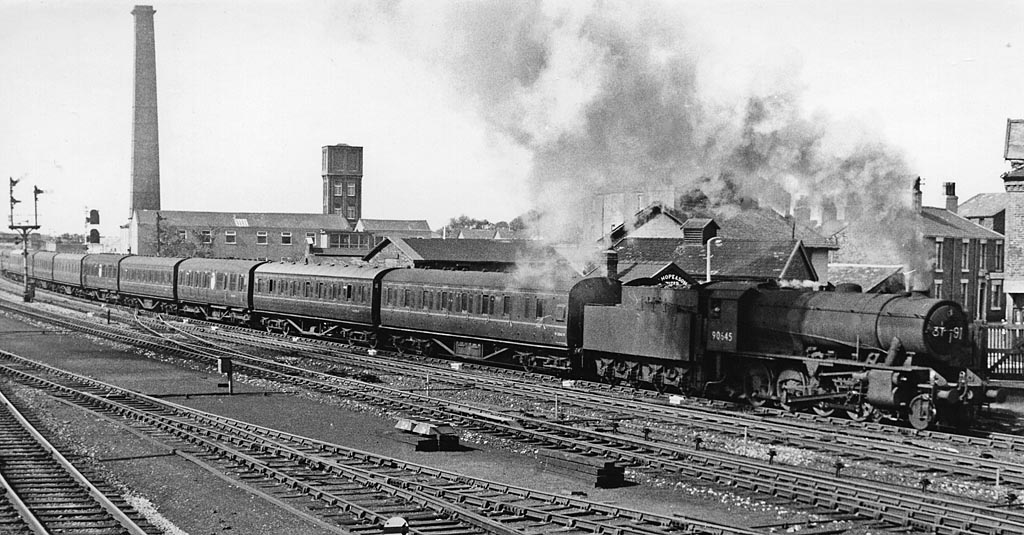
Kirkham station in 1962

The line continued to Poulton and Kirkham and arrangements were made on market days to stop trains at Salwick and Lea Road between Kirkham and Preston. There seems to have been no stations at these locations. The Preston station was Maudlands at Leighton Street, a terminus adjacent to the Lancaster Canal. Maudlands was accessed by crossing the Lancaster and Preston Junction Railway (L&PJR) on the level. The L&PJR line was constructed at a level five feet higher than the P&WR line which had to be lifted to make the level crossing. A connection into the southbound L&PJR was made later enabling Fleetwood trains to use the NUR station. The P&WR ran an omnibus between Maudlands and the NUR station for connecting passenger trains.

Preston and Wyre Railway and Harbour and Preston and Wyre Dock Consolidation Act 1839
- Act of Parliament
- Parliament of the United Kingdom
- Long title: An Act to amend the several Acts relating to the Preston and Wyre Railway and Harbour Company and the Preston and Wyre Dock Company, and to consolidate the said Companies.
- Citation: 2 & 3 Vict. c. liv

Dates
- Royal assent: 1 July 1839

Text of statute as originally enacted

The dock and railway companies were amalgamated by an act of Parliament, the Preston and Wyre Railway and Harbour and Preston and Wyre Dock Consolidation Act 1839 (2 & 3 Vict. c. liv) of 1 July 1839 but work on the dock was deferred, although a wharf, pier and lighthouses were constructed. The single line railway opened on 15 July 1840 for a special train and on 16 July to the public.

Traffic exceeded expectations: 20,000 passengers were carried in the first month, and in the six summer months of 1841 the total was 108,000. The line was worked by North Union Railway locomotives and rolling stock. The Lancaster and Preston Junction Railway opened on 25 June 1840

The Fleetwood line carried traffic from London to Scotland as there was no through railway line. Trains to Fleetwood to and a steamer to Ardrossan and train for the onward journey took about 27 hours. The route ceased to be significant in 1848 with the opening of the Caledonian Railway, providing a through railway route.

== Branches ==
Preston and Wyre Railway, Harbour and Dock Act 1845
- Act of Parliament
- Parliament of the United Kingdom
- Long title: An Act to amend the several Acts relating to the Preston and Wyre Railway, Harbour, and Dock Company; and to enable the said Company to make Three several Branch Railways.
- Citation: 8 & 9 Vict. c. cxxv

Dates
- Royal assent: 21 July 1845

In 1844 seaside excursions were run to Fleetwood from Manchester and it became apparent that the emerging resort of Blackpool was an attraction. Hoteliers arranged road connections to their town from Poulton. The Preston and Wyre Railway decided to build a branch to Blackpool from Poulton and an authorising act of Parliament, the Preston and Wyre Railway, Harbour and Dock Act 1845 (8 & 9 Vict. c. cxxv) was passed on 21 July 1845. The Blackpool branch (to Blackpool North) was built swiftly. During construction the contractor extended the temporary track used for building the line to the sea front to facilitate tipping spoil into the sea. The line opened on 29 April 1846.

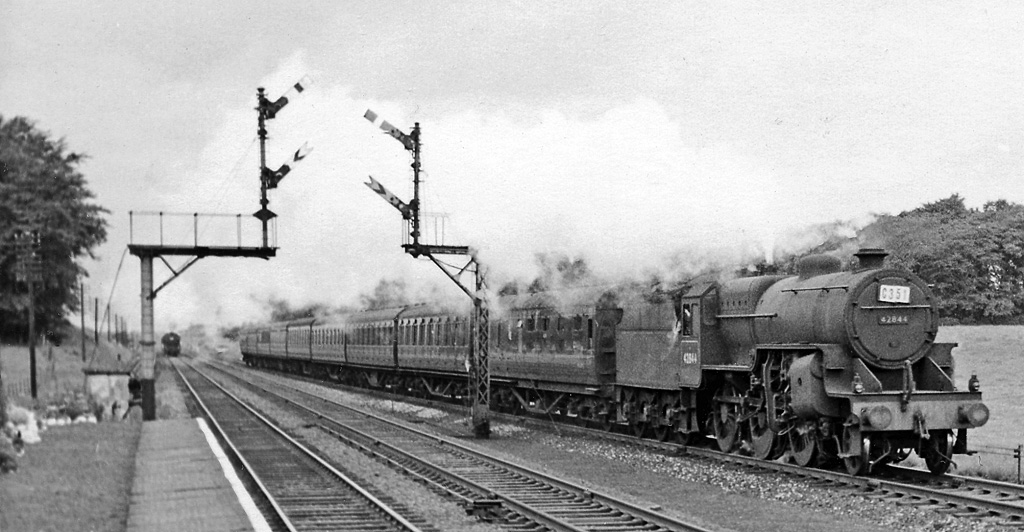
Salwick railway station

The company decided that a branch to Lytham where there was a small harbour was worthwhile. It was authorised in the act of Parliament of 21 July 1845 to run from a junction three-quarters of a mile west of Kirkham. Construction proceeded swiftly and the branch opened on 17 February 1846. Stations were built at Wrea Green (Note: The railway named the station Wray Green until 1875.) and Moss Side and the line forked to a terminus and a spur to serve the dock. Lytham Junction station was provided at the junction on the main line but it closed in 1853. Lytham portions of trains were detached and attached there until 1874.

== Amalgamation ==
Lancashire and Yorkshire and London and North Western Railways (Preston and Wyre Railway, Harbour and Dock Vesting) Act 1849
- Act of Parliament
- Parliament of the United Kingdom
- Long title: An Act for vesting in the Lancashire and Yorkshire Railway Company and the London and North-western Railway Company the Preston and Wyre Railway, Harbour, and Dock, and all the Works, Property, and Effects belonging thereto.
- Citation: 12 & 13 Vict. c. lxxiv

Dates
- Royal assent: 28 July 1849

Text of statute as originally enacted

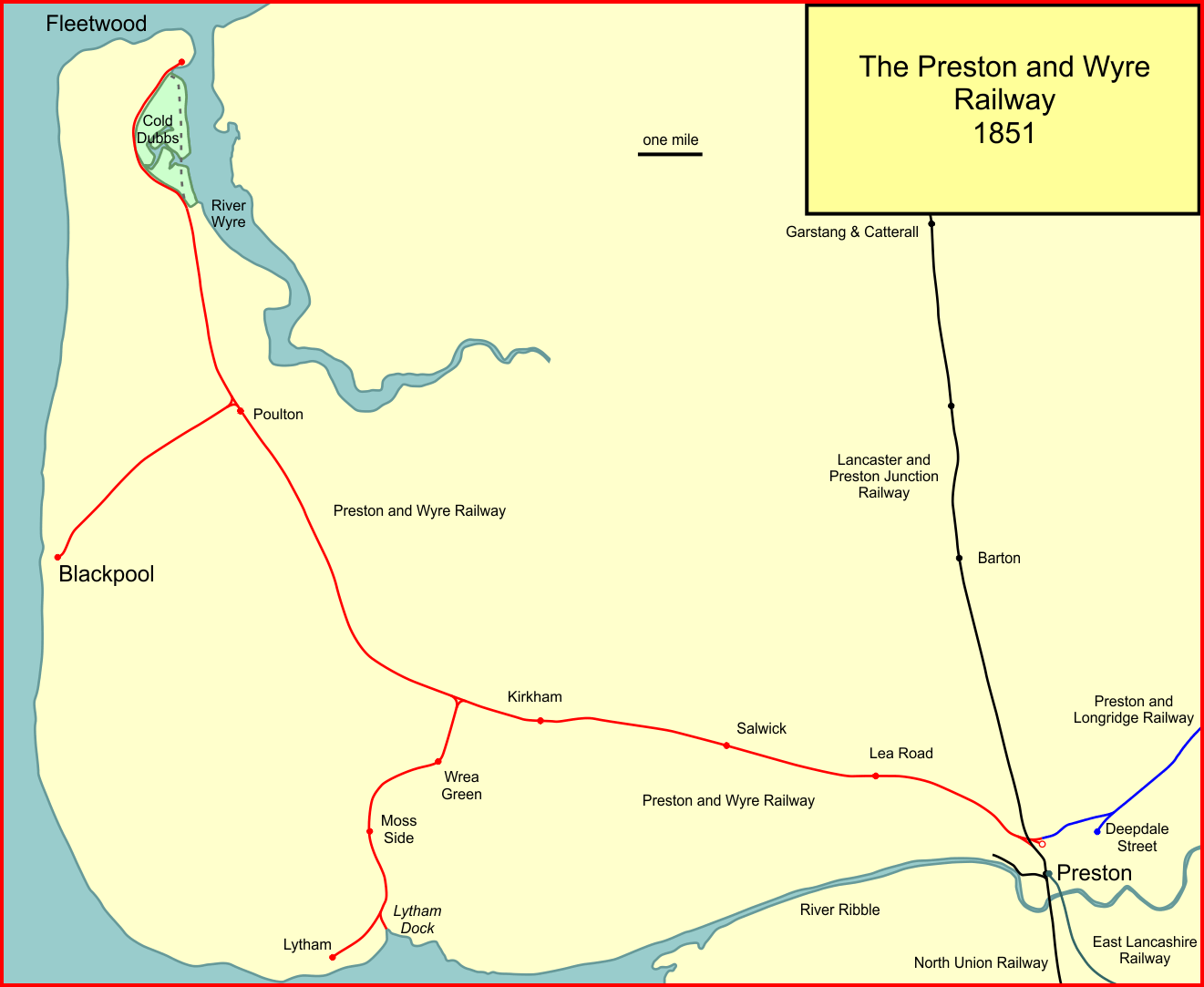
The Preston and Wyre Railway in 1851

The Manchester and Leeds Railway (M&LR) ran excursions over the line and amalgamation was agreed. The Preston and Wyre Railway was leased by the M&LR from 3 August 1846. The M&LR was renamed the Lancashire and Yorkshire Railway (L&YR) the following year. The London and North Western Railway (LNWR), that operated of the main line at Preston, was then included in the leasing relationship, and by the Lancashire and Yorkshire and London and North Western Railways (Preston and Wyre Railway, Harbour and Dock Vesting) Act 1849 (12 & 13 Vict. c. lxxiv), the Preston and Wyre Railway was vested in the two railways, a two-thirds share in the L&YR and one-third in the LNWR. The P&WR continued as a leased company until it was dissolved on 1 July 1888 under the London and North Western Railway Act 1888 (51 & 52 Vict. c. clxxvi) on 7 August of that year. A joint committee was appointed by the LNWR and the L&YR to manage the P&WR network. The line was now known as the Preston and Wyre Joint Line.

== Preston and Longridge Railway ==
The Preston and Longridge Railway opened in 1840, connecting quarries north east of Preston to a terminal at Deepdale Street, in Preston. The company was taken over by the Fleetwood, Preston and West Riding Junction Railway in 1847 (Note: Not "Joint" Railway.) which planned to connect the Preston and Wyre line to the Longridge line by building a tunnel through high ground. Its ambitious title was justified by a plan to build eastward from the Longridge line to Clitheroe and Skipton that was never built.

The new section of line in Preston joining the Preston and Wyre Railway near Maudlands with a level crossing of the Lancaster line opened on 14 January 1850. The FP&WRJR was short of money and suspended operating the Longridge line for three weeks in 1852. The Preston and Longridge company resumed control in 1856, and later that year the FP&WRJR took over again. It opened a station at Maudland Bridge on 1 November 1856.

For some time goods and mineral wagons were transferred from the Longridge line to the Preston main line station by crossing from Maudland Bridge to the Preston and Wyre line west of the main line and reversing and using the P&WR connection on to the main line. The Longridge line built its own connection southwards, opening for passengers and goods on 1 June 1885.

== Developments ==
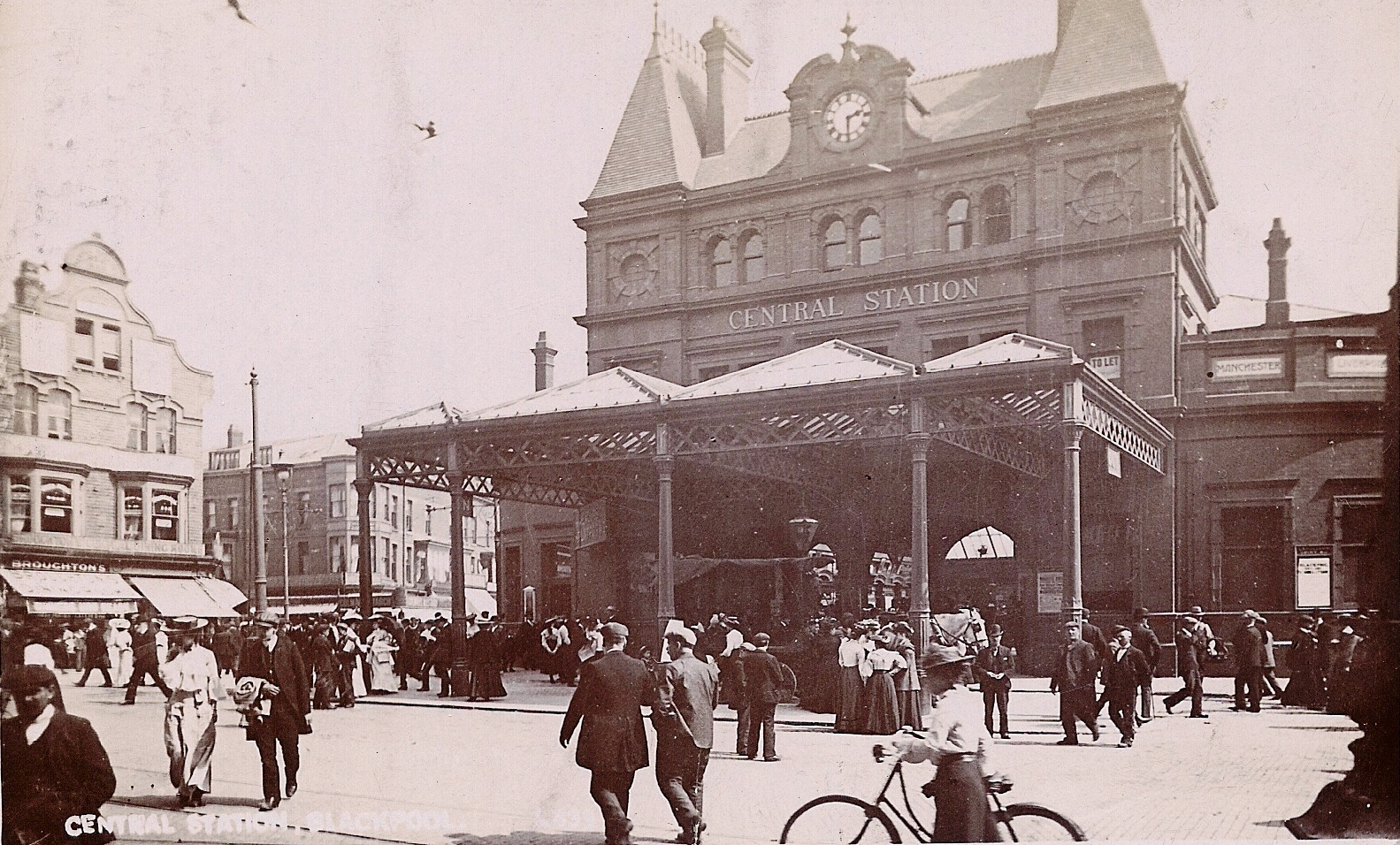
Blackpool Central station in 1906

The main line was doubled as far as Burn Naze by 10 August 1846. The embankment between Burn Naze and Fleetwood was to be retained as the up line and a single line, some distance from the original, following a two-mile deviation around the shore was built as the down line opening on 13 January 1851. Problems with the embankment and timber trestle sections caused the original line's abandonment at the same time. The deviation line was a single line that ran to Dock Street in Fleetwood, but entered the station from the south-west. A goods depot was built beyond the passenger station. The deviation was doubled in 1875.

Preston and Wyre Railway, Harbour and Dock Act 1865
- Act of Parliament
- Parliament of the United Kingdom
- Long title: An Act to authorize the widening of the Blackpool Branch of the Preston and Wyre Railway; and for other Purposes.
- Citation: 28 & 29 Vict. c. xxii

Dates
- Royal assent: 26 May 1865

The Blackpool branch was doubled by an act of Parliament, the Preston and Wyre Railway, Harbour and Dock Act 1865 (28 & 29 Vict. c. xxii) of 26 May 1865, paid for by the companies in proportion.

== Blackpool and Lytham Railway, and more improvements ==
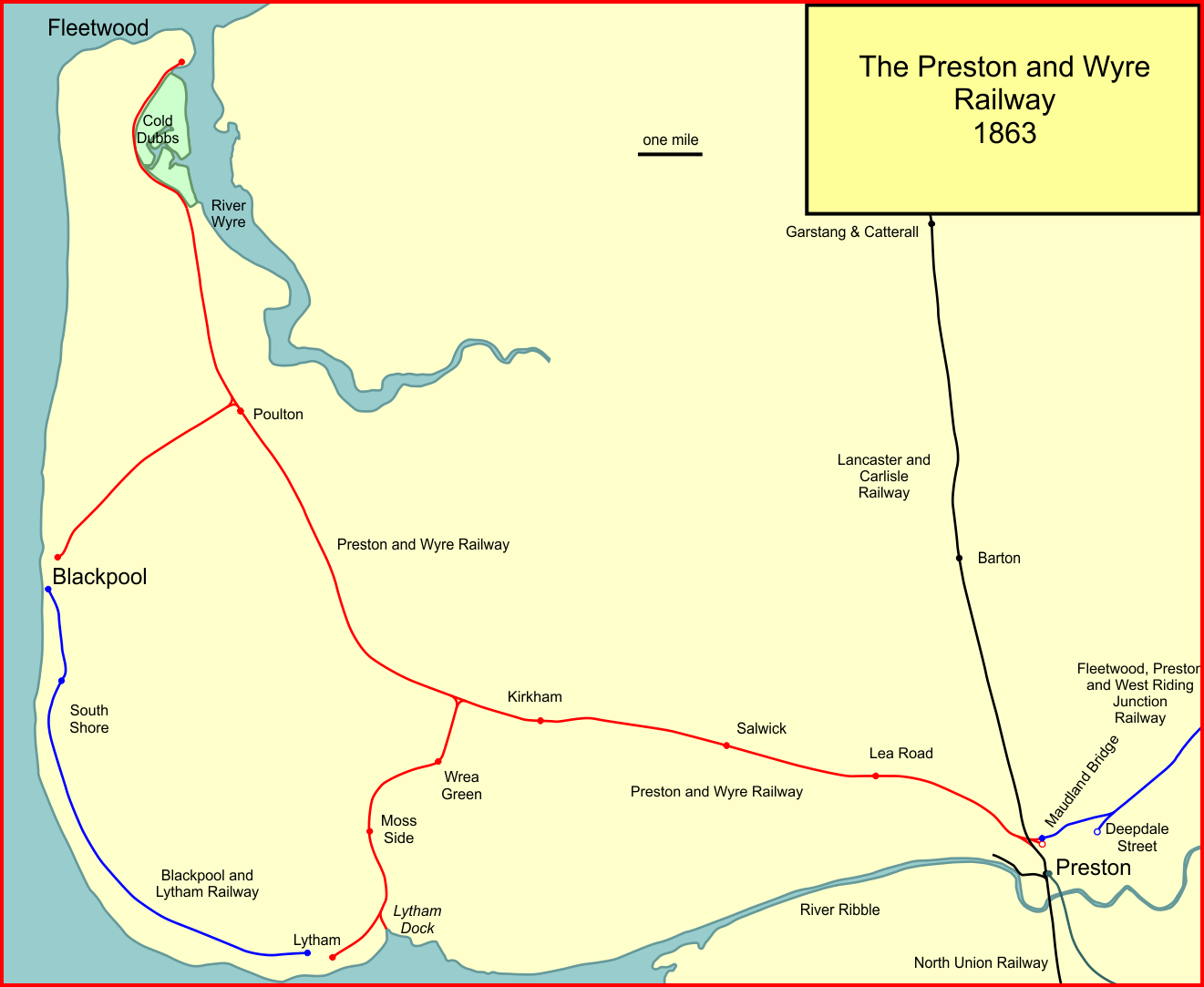
The Preston and Wyre Railway in 1863

Blackpool and Lytham Railway Act 1861
- Act of Parliament
- Parliament of the United Kingdom
- Long title: An Act for making a Railway from Blackpool in the County of Lancaster to Lytham in the same County.
- Citation: 24 & 25 Vict. c. ix

Dates
- Royal assent: 17 May 1861

On 17 May 1861, an act of Parliament, the Blackpool and Lytham Railway Act 1861 (24 & 25 Vict. c. ix) was passed authorising the Blackpool and Lytham Railway, the future Blackpool South line. The line was ready by autumn 1862. Leisure traffic was expected to be the main income, and the winter months would be quiet and so the opening was delayed until 6 April 1863. The line did not connect to the Lytham branch of the Preston and Wyre Railway, nor at Blackpool, so the line was isolated. The company operated its own trains and had two locomotives. At least one was delivered by being hauled through the streets of Lytham by horses, because of the lack of a railway connection. An intermediate station was built at South Shore. The resort of St Annes did not yet exist.

Lancashire and Yorkshire and London and North-western Railways (Blackpool and Lytham Railway, &c.) Act 1871
- Act of Parliament
- Parliament of the United Kingdom
- Long title: An Act for amalgamating the Blackpool and Lytham Railway with the Preston and Wyre Railway, Harbour, and Dock Undertaking of the Lancashire and Yorkshire and London and North-western Railway Companies; and for conferring upon those Companies further powers in connexion with the said Undertaking; and for other purposes.
- Citation: 34 & 35 Vict. c. lxiv

Dates
- Royal assent: 29 June 1871

Text of statute as originally enacted

In 1871 the independent status of the line was reviewed because of financial difficulties, and by an act of Parliament, the Lancashire and Yorkshire and London and North-western Railways (Blackpool and Lytham Railway, &c.) Act 1871 (34 & 35 Vict. c. lxiv) of 29 June 1871, amalgamation with the Preston and Wyre Joint Railway was authorised, along with provision for a connecting line at Lytham.

The Lytham branch made a sharp divergence about three-quarters of a mile west of Kirkham. An act of Parliament, the Lancashire and Yorkshire Railway (New Works and Additional Powers) Act 1873 (36 & 37 Vict. c. clxxix) of 21 July 1873 authorised a cut-off line, a little under a mile and a half in length and a connecting line was authorised at Lytham, connecting the Blackpool line to the original Lytham branch. Both sections were double track from opening on 1 July 1874. Lytham station on the P&WR was reduced to goods station status. The single-line link at Kirkham, now by-passed, was retained for the west-facing connection at what became called Kirkham Old Junction, enabling direct running from Lytham towards Poulton. The east-facing curve at Kirkham was closed in 1874. The Blackpool and Lytham line was doubled in 1876.

== Maudlands closure ==
The Preston terminus of the Preston and Wyre Railway at Maudlands was close to a canal basin, but a connecting line was built to the North Union Railway's Preston station. Interconnection with other railways was important and so the Maudlands connection was retained for goods purposes but its passenger use ended in 1844. A flat crossing with the West Coast Main Line was built in 1850 when the Preston and Longridge Railway was opened. Its station was at Maudland Bridge and its line continued westwards to join the P&WR, enabling Longridge traffic to reach Fleetwood, and making an additional flat crossing of the WCML. In 1885 the flat crossings were removed, the Longridge line making an ordinary southwards junction, which the P&WR already had made.

== Fleetwood dock traffic ==
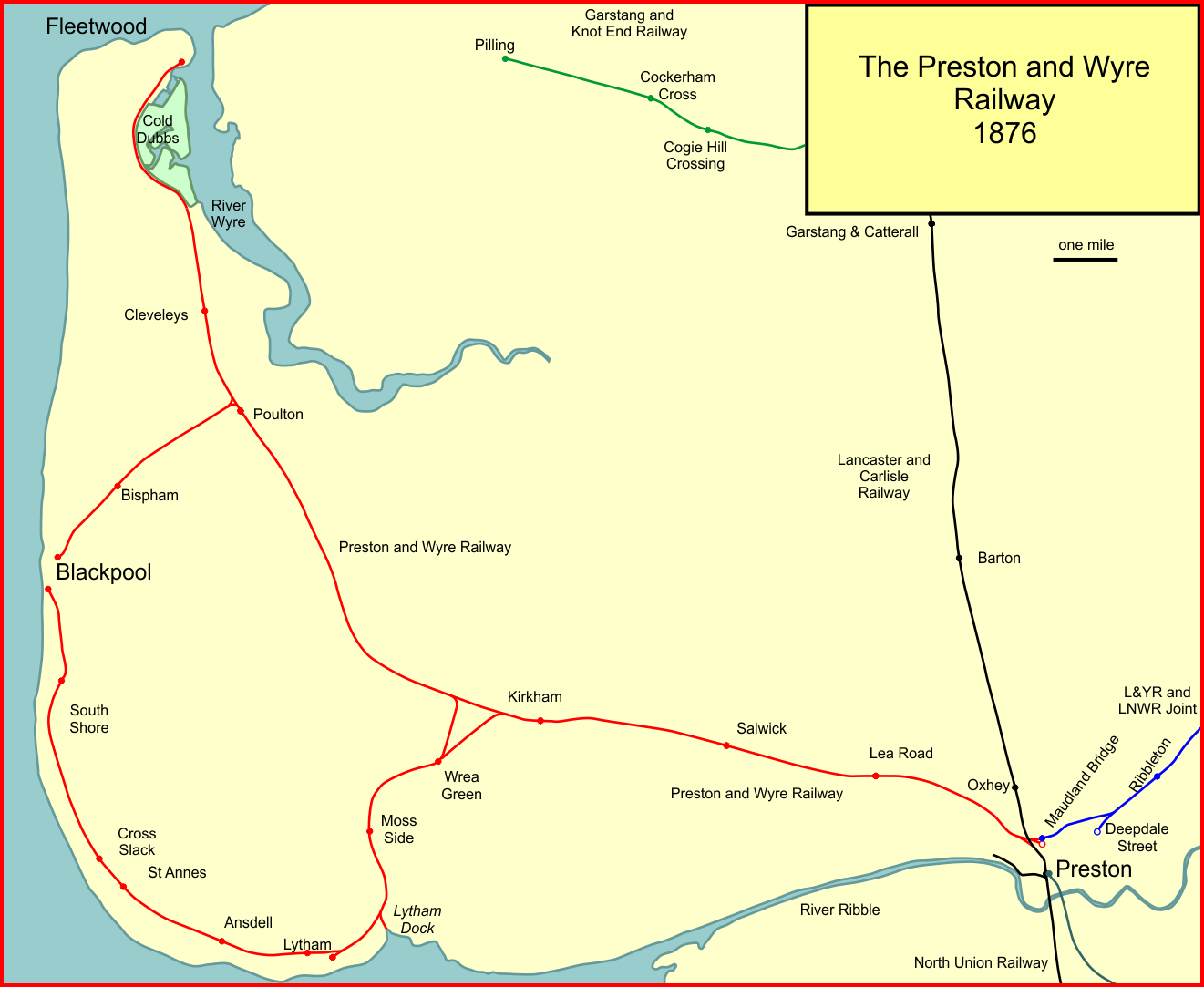
The Preston and Wyre Railway in 1876

Fleetwood Dock was authorised at the outset, but work only started in 1869 and was soon stopped. The Lancashire and Yorkshire Railway took over construction and it opened in 1878. The short branch to Wyre Dock was L&YR property.

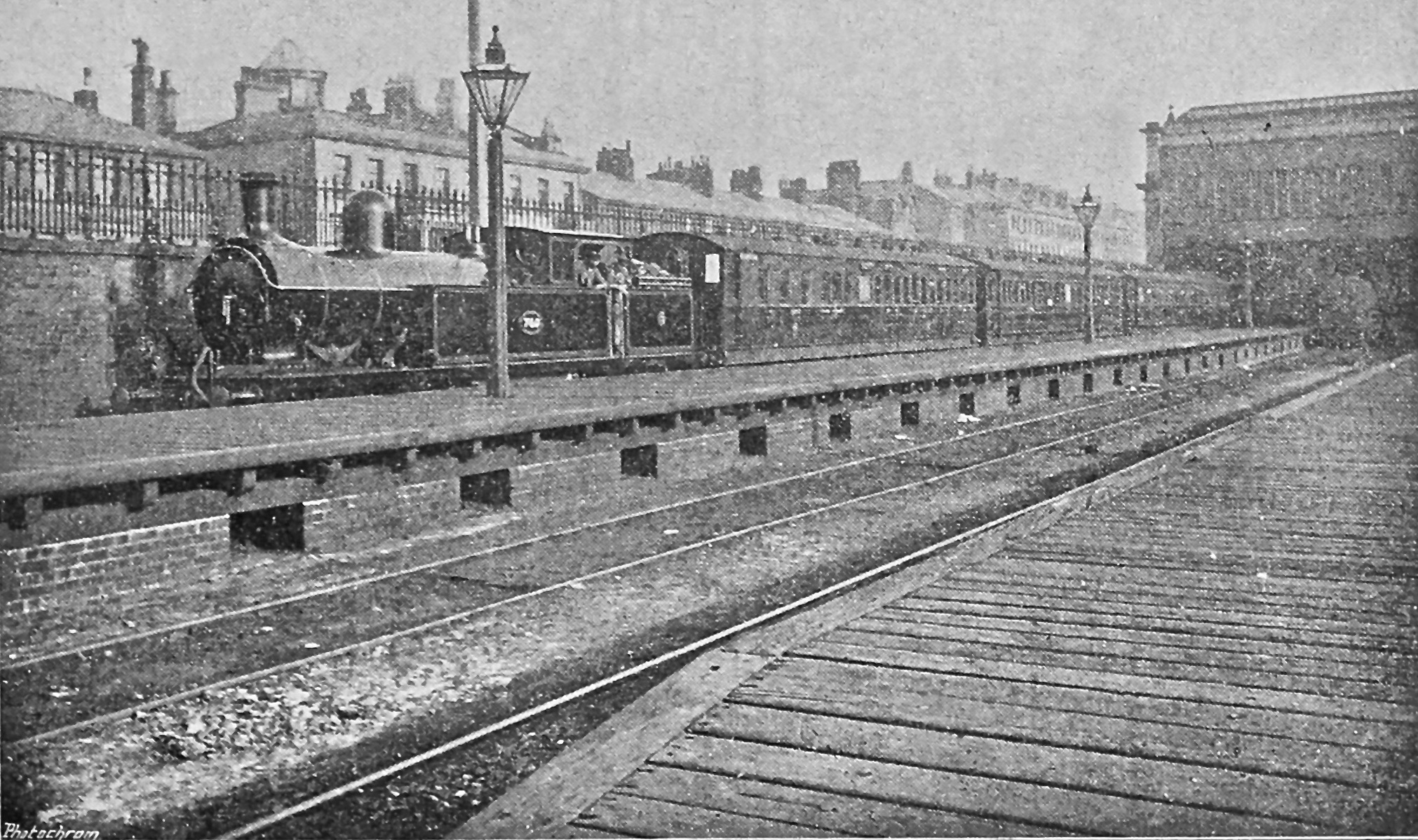
A boat train at Fleetwood in 1901

The L&YR and the LNWR had powers to operate steamer services to Belfast, Londonderry and the Isle of Man and operated through boat trains. On 15 July 1883 a new station opened on the quay at Fleetwood for transfer from boat trains to the steamers, and traffic developed greatly. The old station was closed as the new station better served the promenade for passengers not transferring to the steamers. Some fishing vessels used Fleetwood from 1860, but in 1892 a trawler fishing fleet was established by a Grimsby firm and the town became the largest fishing port on the west coast and the third largest in Britain, with heavy fish traffic sent by rail.

== Passenger trains ==
In 1895 the first Club Carriage was run between Blackpool Central and Manchester, membership of the club was restricted to first-class season ticket holders who also paid a membership fee. Elaborately furnished carriages were built and for many years returned from Manchester to Blackpool each evening by the 5.10 pm and 5.55 pm residential expresses. At one time they conveyed slip portions that were detached at Kirkham. A lesser-known L&YR residential train for East Lancashire business men ran non-stop from Lytham to Rose Grove, slipping the three rear coaches at Blackburn.

On 1 May 1901 the first L&YR corridor and dining car express was introduced between Fleetwood and Leeds via Manchester, connecting with the Belfast steamer. Belfast steamer sailings from Fleetwood continued until the improvement of the Heysham service in 1928. The summer service to Douglas, Isle of Man lasted until 1961, when heavy repairs were required to the quay and the expense could not be justified. Fleetwood terminus and the line from Wyre Dock were closed on 18 April 1966. The former Wyre Dock station was renamed Fleetwood, but the passenger service between here and Poulton ceased on 1 June 1970.

== Infrastructure improvements ==
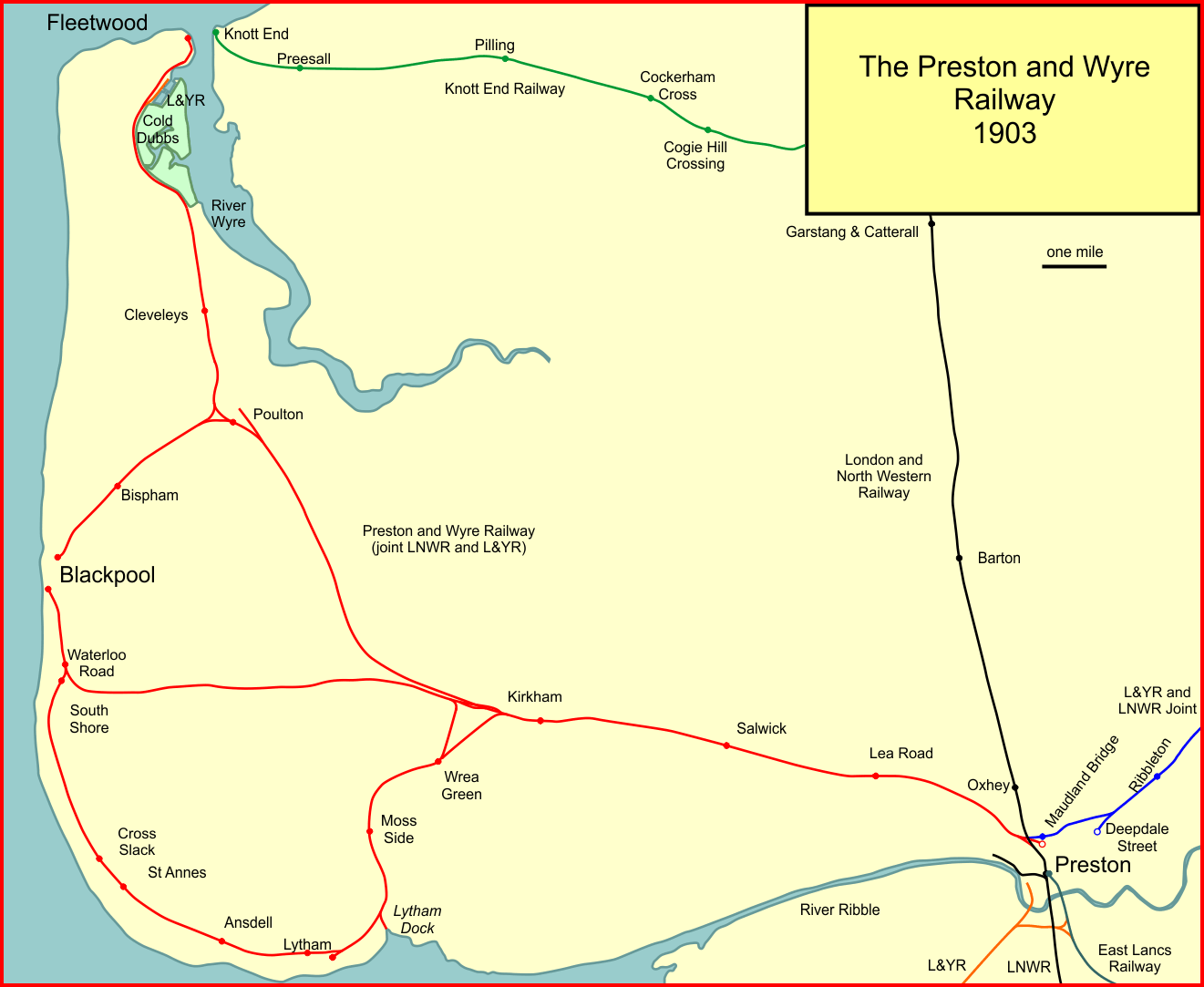
The Preston and Wyre Railway in 1903

The rapid and huge development of Blackpool as a holiday and trippers' destination continued in the latter decades of the nineteenth century, and the line between Preston and Kirkham was quadrupled, opening in the year 1889.

The Preston and Wyre Railway terminus in Blackpool (Talbot Road) was completely rebuilt and enlarged from 1896. The main platforms had a total length of 3,600 feet and the excursion platforms 6,300 feet; they were fully opened in the Spring of 1898.

The original alignment of the Fleetwood main line passed Poulton at some distance, so that the station was not conveniently located. When the Blackpool branch was opened in 1846, it left the Fleetwood line by a sharp curve, and there was a west curve, enabling Blackpool to Fleetwood direct running. (Note: Shown in contemporary Ordnance Survey plans, but not in Cobb.) The alignment was obviously unsatisfactory, and on 28 March 1896, a new loop line by-passing Poulton by a loop was opened, enabling a station better located for the town. (Note: According to Holt; McLoughlin says 6 April 1896.) The Blackpool branch left by a more gently curved line from the new Poulton station; the approach to the old Poulton station from the Preston direction was retained for goods purposes, as the town had grown towards that station over the years. A west curve on the new line was opened on 1 July 1899, and a platform called Poulton Curve Halt was opened on it on 1 February 1909, used by a railmotor service between Blackpool and Fleetwood. There were 19 trains each way daily.

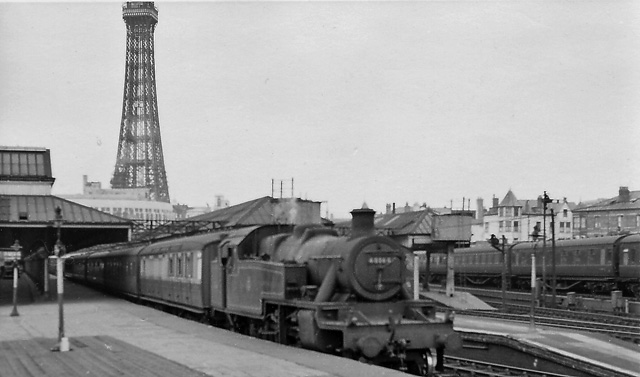
Blackpool Central station in 1959

The approach from Kirkham to Blackpool Central was roundabout, running via Lytham, and a new direct line was authorised by the Lancashire and Yorkshire and London and North Western Railways Act 1896 (59 & 60 Vict. c. cxxxiv) of 20 July 1896. It opened on 21 April 1903 for goods traffic, and to all trains on 30 May 1903. It saved five miles on the journey: it ran from a grade-separated junction at Kirkham North Junction to a junction near Blackpool South Shore, and it was known as the "New line" or the "Marton line". In winter ordinary passenger trains used the Lytham route, but in summer the traffic on the New Line was heavy. For some years the slip portion of the 5.10 pm from Manchester ran from Kirkham to Blackpool Central by this route, arriving ahead of the main train. New platforms were opened on the line at Waterloo Road, close to South Shore.

The Lancashire and Yorkshire Railway (Various Powers) Act 1899 (62 & 63 Vict. c. lxxxv) of 13 July 1899 authorised a flyover approaching Kirkham for the New Line, providing a grade-separated junction.

At the end of the 19th century, Blackpool Central station was being reconstructed, with 9,000 feet of platforms being provided; the enlarged station was opening for Easter 1901. In 1903 widening from there to the junction at South Shore was ready.

On 1 October 1913 halts were opened at Burlington Road and Gillett's Crossing when a railmotor service was introduced between Blackpool Central and Lytham. The halts were closed on 1 October 1915 but reopened on 1 March 1920, finally closing on 11 September 1939. In March 1932 Waterloo Road station was renamed Blackpool South and Talbot Road became Blackpool North. By this time the North station had 15 platforms, although eight were set apart for excursion traffic outside the overall roof.

== Cleveleys over the tramway ==
The Blackpool tramway system was founded in 1885, and the line to Fleetwood was opened on 14 July 1888, running in a segregated alignment for much of the way.

As the coastal strip between Blackpool and Fleetwood became developed, the L&YR and LNWR sought powers to build a branch line to Cleveleys, but instead came to an agreement under which the tramway was connected with the railway at Fleetwood. Goods wagons were worked over the tramway to Cleveleys. The arrangement continued until 1949.

== Diesel train trial ==
In 1928 a four-car diesel passenger train was installed on the Preston to Blackpool Central via Lytham service, starting on 25 July. The train was a conversion of an electric train that had been used at Bury. In September 1928 it was withdrawn for installation of a stronger bogie under the power unit. The train was put back into service for the illuminations at the end of 1928 but a crankshaft failed on 9 December and it was out of use until 27 March 1929. It was then in use for three weeks until 18 April when it was finally withdrawn and later scrapped. It had only operated for 30% of available days. Quite apart from the reliability issues, it was calculated that the operating cost savings were not sufficient to justify the capital cost of wider introduction.

== Traffic decline ==
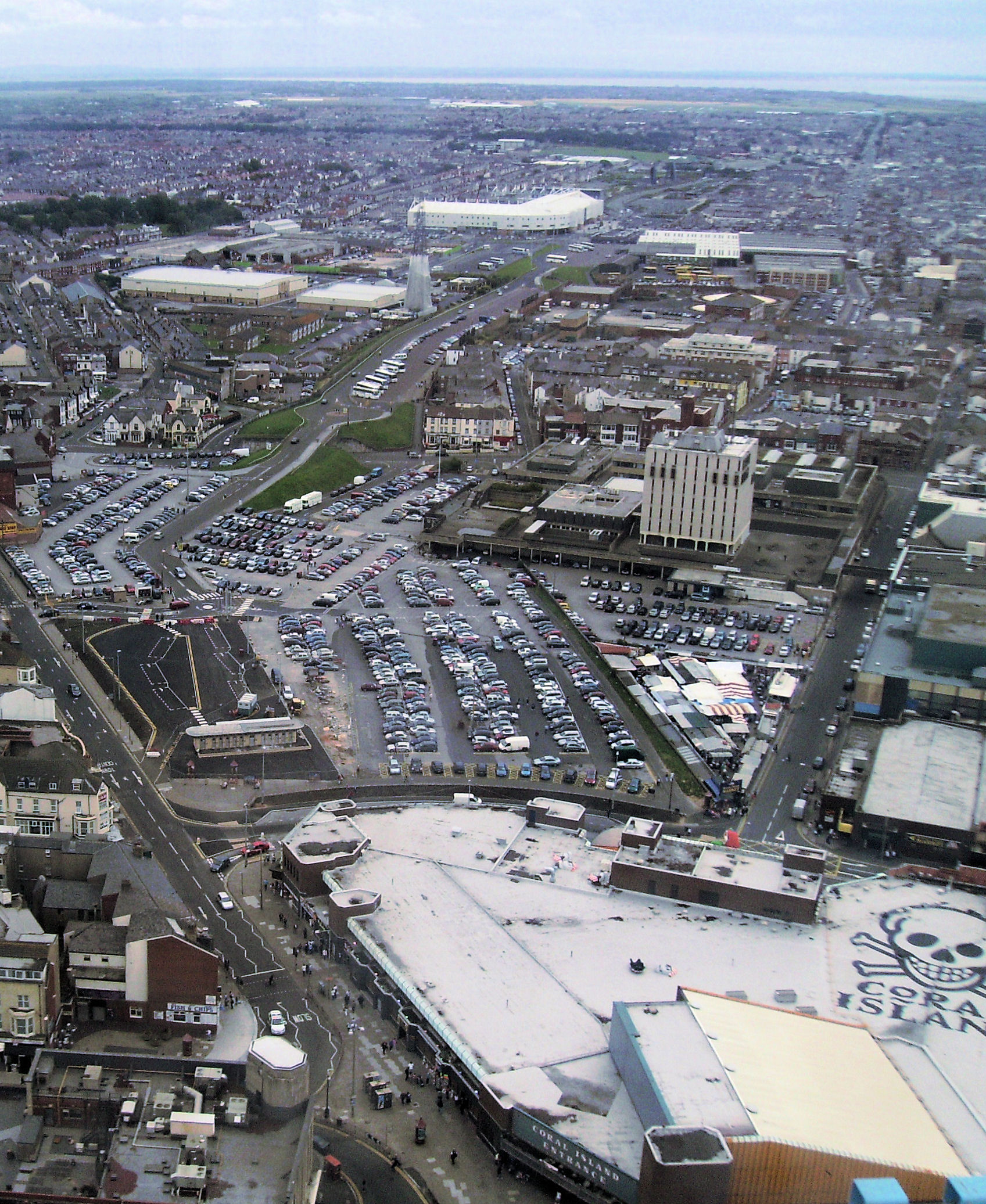
The site of Blackpool Central railway station looking south; Blackpool South station can be seen in the background

Blackpool was an extraordinary phenomenon of British seaside holidays, and for decades the railways had struggled to handle the volume of passengers, and the number of train movements, although this was highly seasonal. Nevertheless, road motor coaches began to handle the traffic in increasing numbers after 1945, as distances from the Lancashire and West Yorkshire industrial towns were not great. The decline in railway business in an era of scepticism about financial loss-making on the railways meant that it was impossible to sustain the former levels of train service, and of infrastructure.

Blackpool Central station was closed at the end of the 1964 Illuminations period, on 2 November, and the site was sold; trains on the coast line terminated at Blackpool South, and a few years later they were only shuttle services to and from Kirkham. The Fleetwood to Blackpool passenger service had finished in 1964. On 18 April 1966, the Fleetwood line was cut back to Wyre Dock.

The New Line from Kirkham closed on 6 September 1965, although it was used for excursion trains until 13 February 1967. In 1970 the Euston-Blackpool services, which had hitherto travelled via Lytham, were diverted to the North station. In January 1974 this station was rebuilt on the site of the former excursion platforms, on a smaller scale to suit modern requirements.

The south to west connection at Kirkham, which used part of the original Lytham branch, was closed in 1967, and the retained connection to Poulton old goods station was closed in 1968; the west curve on the new line at Poulton was closed in 1972.

The passenger service between Fleetwood and Poulton ceased on 1 June 1970. The line remained open to chemical works at Burn Naze, but beyond that, Fleetwood and the docks were no longer rail-served. The entire branch from Poulton closed in 1992.

In the 1970s and early 1980s the Blackpool South branch, as it had become, was singled, and the quadruple track between Preston and Kirkham was reduced to double track.

== The present day ==
During a long period of decline, the Blackpool North line became a medium-level branch from Preston, and the Blackpool South line a local shuttle subsidiary of that, from Kirkham. The Fleetwood line is no more. For some time local opinion formers have demanded better services, and electrification of the line from Preston to Blackpool North was implemented. This was commissioned in time for new passenger services to operate from 16 April 2018. As of 2020 there were three through trains to and from London in the timetable and a half-hourly service to Manchester. The service from Blackpool South is typically hourly.

== Reopening the Fleetwood Branch ==
As of Midsummer 2022, the BBC are reporting that plans to re-open the railway from Poulton to Fleetwood have been approved by the government.

== Accidents ==
=== Poulton 1893 ===
There was a serious accident on 1 July 1893, when a light excursion train returning from Blackpool to Stockport became derailed at speed on Poulton curve. The speed limit on the curve was 6 mph, and the train considerably exceeded that speed.

=== Lytham, 1924 ===
On 3 November 1924 the 4:40 pm express passenger train from Liverpool Exchange to Blackpool derailed, when a tyre on the engine failed. Three traincrew and fourteen passengers were killed. There had been a large undetected metallurgical defect in the tyre.

=== Weeton, 1961 ===
On 16 July 1961 a collision took place near Singleton Bank signalbox, between Kirkham and Poulton. An express passenger train from Colne to Fleetwood struck an engineers' ballast train at about 45 mph. The driver and six passengers died in the collision. The ballast train was working in section but irregular operation of single-line working arrangements and misunderstandings of telephone messages led to the express train being signalled through the section, so it was running under clear signals.

== Locations ==
=== Preston to Fleetwood ===
- Preston Maudlands; opened 16 July 1840; closed 11 February 1844;
- level crossing of Lancaster and Preston Junction Railway;
  - Maudland Junction (or Preston & Wyre Junction); divergence from Lancaster and Preston Junction Railway;
- junction; convergence of spur from Maudland Junction and from Preston and Longridge Railway;
- Lea Road; opened 16 July 1840; closed 2 May 1938;
- Salwick; opened December 1841; closed 2 May 1938; reopened 8 April 1940 for ICI factory workers and to public 2 November 1942; still open; sometimes shown as Salwick Road;
- Kirkham; opened 16 July 1840; relocated 1890; renamed Kirkham and Wesham 1906; still open.
- Lytham Junction; opened June 1853; closed after November 1853;
- Weeton; Saturday market day stop (but no buildings) 16 July 1840 to April 1843;
- Singleton; opened 16 July 1870; closed 2 May 1932;
- Poulton No 1 Junction; divergence of 1896 Poulton Loop;
- Poulton; divergence of Lytham branch; opened 16 July 1840; closed 29 March 1896;
- Point of convergence of 1896 deviation;
- Ramper road; Saturday market day stop (but no buildings) 16 July 1840 to April 1843; Cleveleys, probably at same location; opened 1 April 1865; renamed Thornton for Cleveleys 1 April 1905; relocated 1925; renamed Thornton-Cleveleys 1953; closed 1 June 1970;
- Burn Naze; opened 1 February 1909; closed 1 June 1970;
- Wyre Dock; opened 1 December 1885 for down trains only; up trains began to call 1 May 1901; renamed Fleetwood 18 April 1966; closed 1 June 1970;
- Fleetwood; opened 16 July 1840; re-located 13 February 1851; renamed Fleetwood Dock Street August 1852; reverted 1876/7; relocated 15 July 1883.

=== Blackpool (North) branch ===
- Lytham Junction; above;
- Bispham; opened June 1868; renamed Layton 4 July 1938; still open.
- Blackpool; opened 29 April 1846; renamed Blackpool Talbot Road 1872; renamed Blackpool North 17 March 1932; still open.

=== Poulton 1896 deviation ===
- Poulton no 1 Junction; above;
- Poulton; (second station); opened 29 March 1896; renamed Poulton-le-Fylde May 1957; still open;
- triangular junction towards Blackpool; Poulton Curve Halt on south to west curve; opened 1 February 1909; closed 1 December 1952;
- point of convergence with original main line; above.

=== Fleetwood deviation ===
- Burn Naze; above;
- Wyre power station;
- Spur to Wyre Dock, L&YR, 1877 to 1950;
- Fleetwood; opened 15 July 1883; closed 18 April 1966.

=== Kirkham to Lytham cut-off ===
- Kirkham; above;
- Wrea Green; above.

=== Lytham branch ===
- Lytham Junction; above;
- Triangular junction off main line;
- Wray Green; convergence of 1874 cut-off; opened 16 February 1846; renamed Wrea Green 1875; closed 26 June 1961;
- Moss Side; opened 16 February 1846; closed 26 June 1961; reopened 21 November 1983; still open.
- Warton Junction; spur to Lytham Dock 1865 to 1874;
- Lytham Goods Junction; 1874 connection towards Blackpool;
- Lytham; opened 16 February 1846; formal opening; public opening was considered to be next day; closed 1 July 1874.

=== Blackpool and Lytham Railway ===
- Lytham Goods Junction; above;
- Lytham; opened 6 April 1863; still open;
- Ansdell; opened October 1872; relocated 10 October 1903; renamed Ansdell & Fairhaven 25 January 1906; still open;
- St Annes; opened December 1873; renamed St Annes-on-the-Sea 1900; still open;
- Cross Slack; opened June 1870; closed November 1873;
- Gillett's Crossing; opened 1 October 1913; closed 1 October 1915; reopened by August 1919; closed 11 September 1939;
- Stony Hill; opened 1 April 1865; closed September 1872;
- Squires Gate; opened 14 September 1931; still open;
- Blackpool Pleasure Beach; opened 13 April 1987; still open;
- Burlington Road; opened 1 October 1913; closed 1 October 1915; reopened by August 1919; closed 11 September 1939;
- South Shore; opened 6 April 1863; renamed South Shore Lytham Road 30 May 1903; closed 14 July 1916;
- South Shore Waterloo Road; opened 30 May 1903 on New Line; renamed Blackpool Waterloo Road 1914; platforms added 14 July 1916; renamed Blackpool South 17 March 1932; still open;
- Junction; convergence of New Line;
- Spen Dyke;
- Blackpool; opened 6 April 1863; renamed Blackpool Hounds Hill 1872; renamed Blackpool Central 1878; closed 2 November 1964.

=== New line ===
- Kirkham North Junction; above;
- South Shore Waterloo Road; above.

== See also ==
- Poulton & Wyre Railway Society
