= History of Derbyshire =

History of the county in England

Coat of arms of Derbyshire County Council

The history of Derbyshire can be traced back to human settlement since the last Ice Age, over 10,000 years ago. The county of Derbyshire in England dates back to the 11th century.

== The origins of Derbyshire ==
Derbyshire is first mentioned in the Anglo-Saxon Chronicle in 1048 in Manuscript D, known as the "Northern Recension". Its creation appears to be a result of the dismemberment of the Mercian Kingdom's province of the Peak District and the chronicle says, under 1048: “her wæs eac eorðstyrung on Kalendas Maias on manegum stowum, on Wygracestre on Wic on Deorby elles gehwær, eac wæs swiðe mycel mancwealm orfcwealm, eac þæt wilde fyr on Deorbyscire micel yfel dyde gehwær elles.” ("This year also there was an earthquake, on the calends of May, in many places; at Worcester, at Wick, and at Derby, and elsewhere wide throughout England; with very great loss by disease of men and of cattle over all England; and the wild fire in Derbyshire and elsewhere did much harm").

Some old sources wrongly refer to a charter from 926 for land at Hope and Ashford as being “in Derbyshire” but the original of the charter does not say Derbyshire, it just says Hope and Ashford. On the other hand, the later and final appearance of the Mercian Kingdom's province of the Peak District occurs in a charter of King Edgar in 963, where land at Ballidon near Wirksworth is being granted. This charter refers to the land as being “in pago Pecset” not "on Deorbyscire".

Administrative change of the Mercian provinces is often attributed to King Edgar and if this were so then his charters would reflect it, but the Ballidon charter of 963 does not. Therefore, it is more likely that the shiring of Derbyshire and the dismemberment of the Pecsaete took place after 975 in the reign of Æthelred the Unready with the remainder of the Peak District being hived off to Nottinghamshire (two hundreds); Cheshire (one hundred) and Staffordshire (one, possibly two, hundreds), the remaining seven forming Derbyshire.

The name Derbyshire is derived from the Old English word shire, meaning a division of a kingdom with its own governor, with the town of Derby being its administrative centre.

== Natural history ==
The White Peak area of the county is named after the limestone landscape of the Derbyshire Dome anticline. The carboniferous limestone was formed about 300 million years ago and the plateau is generally between 200m and 300m above sea level. This limestone outcrop is surrounded on the west, north and east by a horseshoe-shaped formation of younger sandstones (gritstones) and shales, known as the Dark Peak.

== Prehistory ==
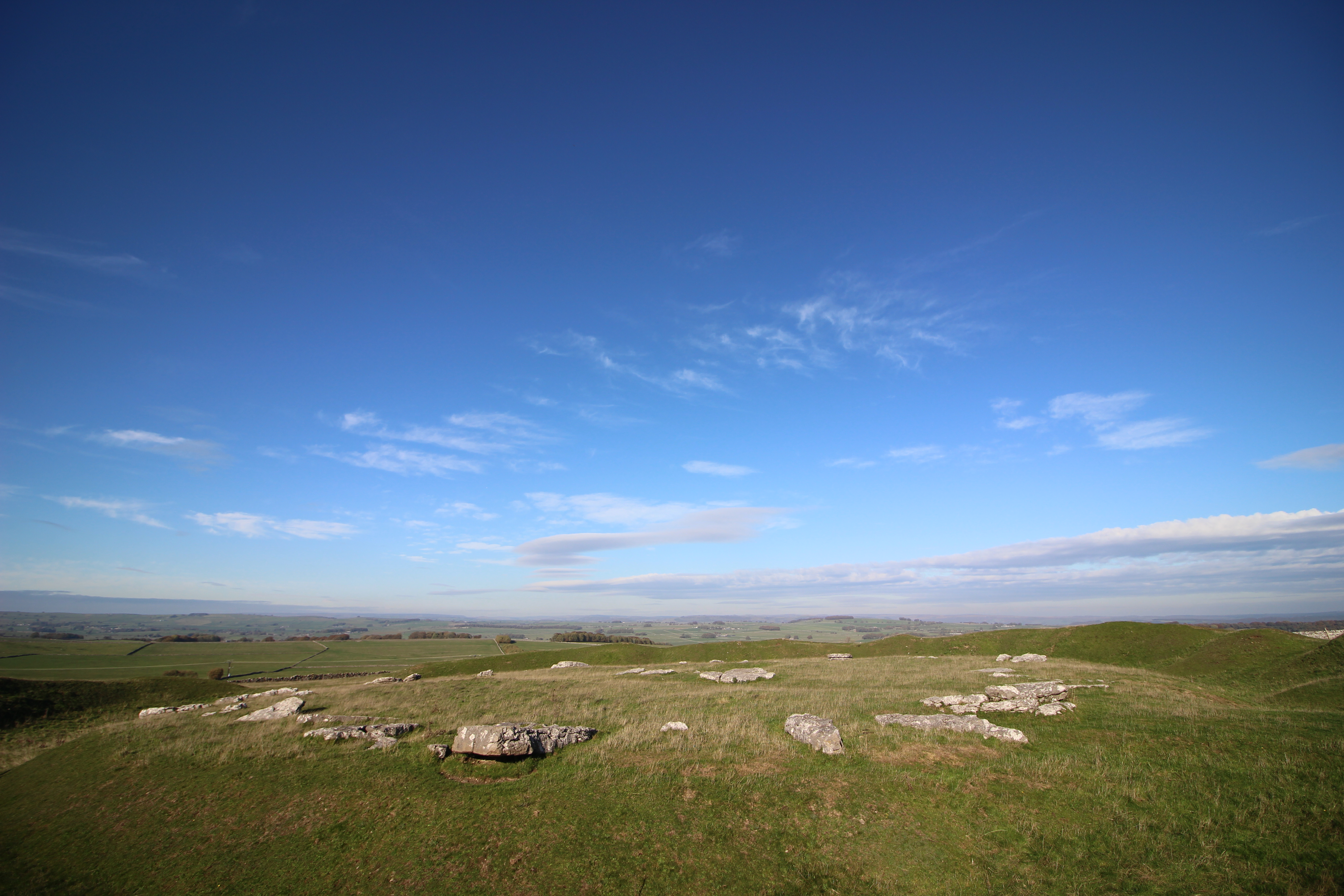
Arbor Low henge

Paleolithic remains of human settlement have been discovered at Creswell Crags (between Chesterfield and Worksop), in Dowel Cave and Fox Cave near Buxton and in Ash Tree Cave and Langwith Cave near Bolsover. The finds in the caves at Creswell Crags gorge include ancient rock art, stone axes and bones from hyena and woolly rhinoceros.

Arbor Low Neolithic henge is the largest stone circle in Derbyshire and there are numerous other Neolithic and Bronze Age henges in the county including Doll Tor, Nine Ladies, Nine Stones Close and The Bull Ring. The remains of a Stone Age settlement (a Mesolithic timber roundhouse and of two Neolithic longhouses) was discovered in 1984 at Lismore Fields in Buxton.

There were Iron Age hillforts at Castle Naze (overlooking Chapel-en-le-Frith), Fin Cop (near Ashford-in-the-Water) and Mam Tor (overlooking Castleton).

These sites are nearly all protected Scheduled Monuments.

== Roman ==
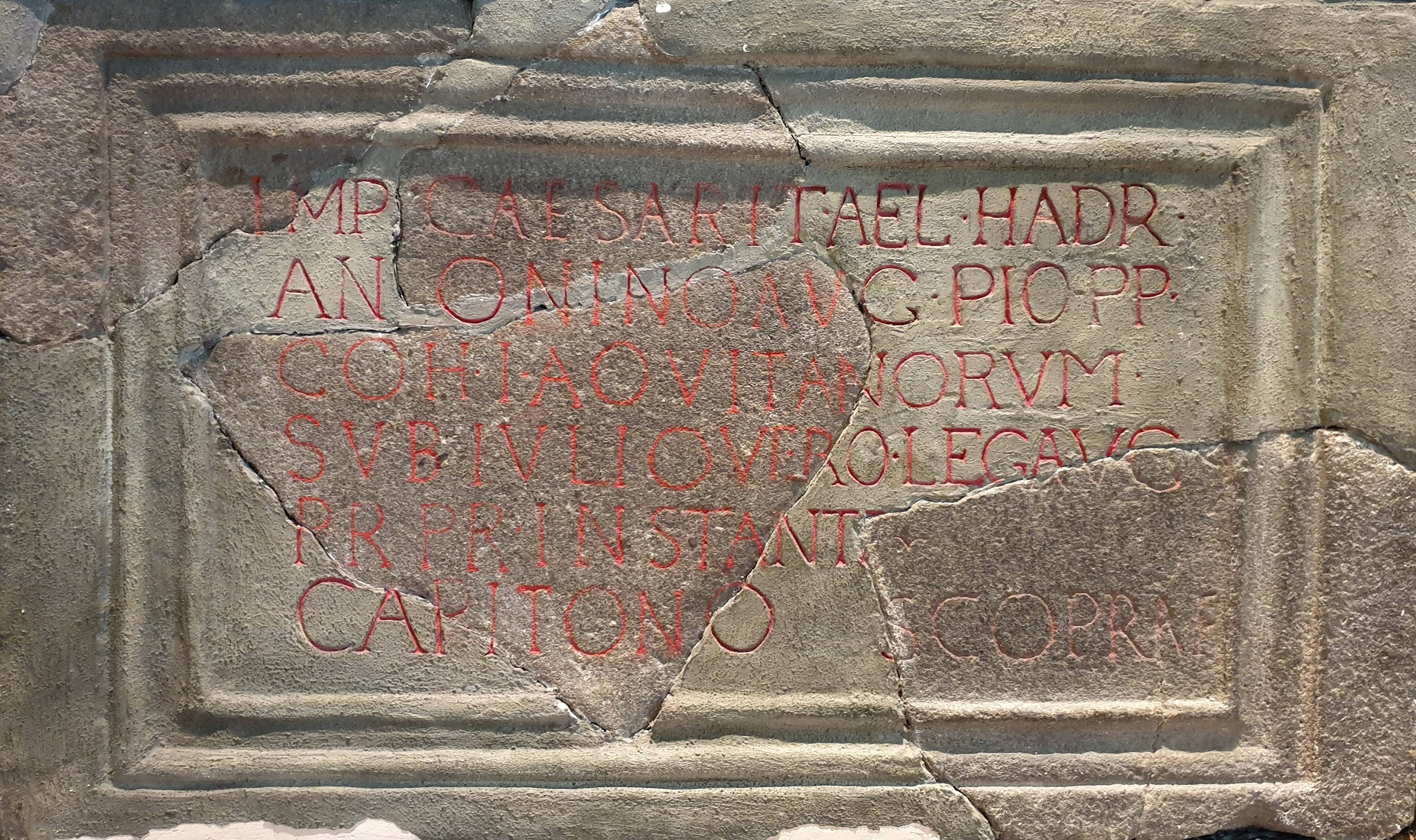
Centurial Stone from Navio Roman Fort

Before the Roman conquest of Britain in the 1st century AD, Derbyshire was within the territory of the Coretani tribe. It then became part of the Roman province of Flavia Cæsariensis.

The Romans established military forts, roads and lead mining in Derbyshire, during their occupation of the province of Britannia during the 1st to 5th centuries. Forts were situated at Derventio (Little Chester near Derby), Chesterfield, Melandra (Glossop) and Navio (Brough-on-Noe). Each fort had a civilian settlement (vicus) around it. Aquae Arnemetiae (waters of the goddess of the grove) was a Roman bath town, founded around the natural warm springs of Buxton. Lutudarum was the Roman lead-mining centre in the area of Wirksworth and Carsington.

Ryknield Street connected Derby (and on to Gloucestershire) with Chesterfield (and on to Yorkshire). Batham Gate ("road to the bath town") ran from Templebrough fort (near Rotherham) to Navio fort and on to Buxton. Doctor's Gate linked Chesterfield with Glossop via Navio, The Street Roman Road ran from Glossop through Buxton and on toward Derby.

== Saxon ==
In Anglo-Saxon times, Derbyshire was in the kingdom of Mercia, and the Saxon kings had a residence by the River Trent at Repton (where King Wiglaf of Mercia and King Æthelbald of Mercia are both buried). During the reigns of King Æthelred the Unready and King Alfred the Great, there were numerous battles between the Saxons and the Danes in Derbyshire. The Vikings occupied the town of Derby for many years.

The Viking cemetery at Heath Wood near Repton (south of Derby) contains a series of 59 barrows (burial mounds), which is the only known Scandinavian cremation site in the British Isles.

== Norman ==
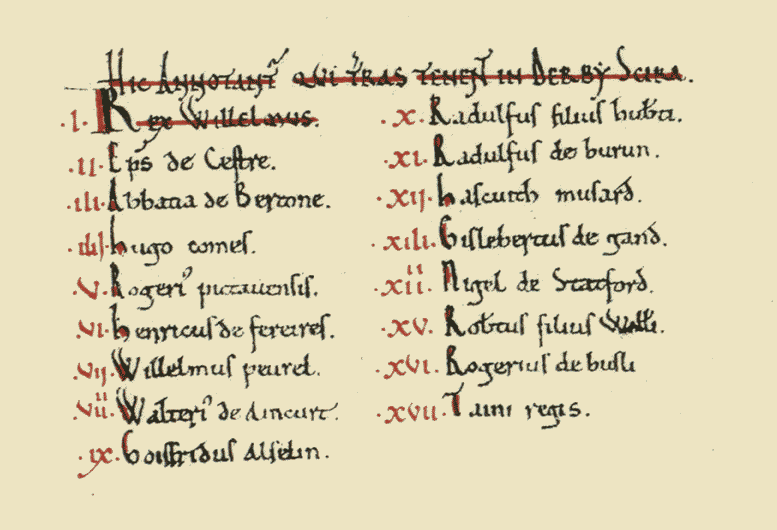
Derbyshire Tenants-in-Chief listed in the Domesday Book

Following the Norman Conquest of England, the Domesday Book of 1086 AD lists the tenants-in-chief of lands in Derbyscire:

- King William the Conqueror
- Bishop of Chester
- Abbey of Burton
- Earl Hugh of Chester
- Roger de Poitou
- Henry de Ferrers
- William Peverel, who built Peveril Castle at Castleton.
- Walter D'Aincourt
- Geoffrey Alselin
- Ralph son of Hubert (FitzHubert)
- Ralph de Buron
- Hascoit Musard de Bretagne
- Gilbert de Gant (Ghent)
- Nigel de Stafford
- Robert Curthose
- Roger de Busli
- King's Thanes

== Medieval hundreds ==
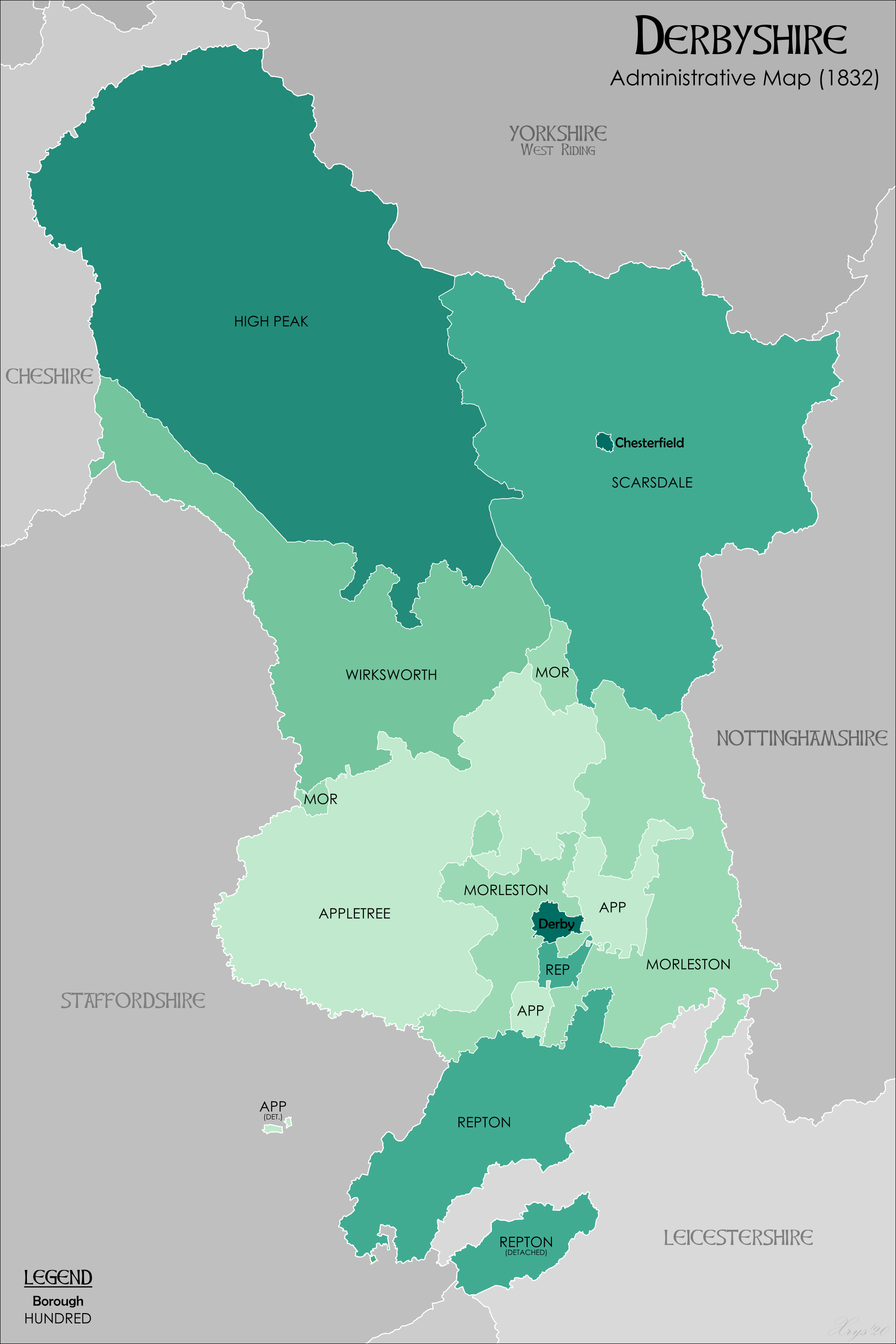
Derbyshire hundreds in 1832

Derbyshire was traditionally divided into Hundreds, namely Appletree, High Peak, Morleyston and Litchurch, Repton and Gresley, Scarsdale, Wirksworth. These were based on the six earlier Wapentakes recorded in the Domesday Book, with a split of Walecross Wapentake into Repton and Gresley and a split of Hamenstan Wapentake into High Peak and Wirksworth taking place, among other gradual changes in the Hundred or Wapentake names. Derbyshire had a detached part in north-western Leicestershire, surrounding Measham and Donisthorpe. This escaped regularisation in 1844, and was incorporated into Leicestershire in 1888 when the county councils were set up. The thin strip of Leicestershire between the exclave and Derbyshire, containing Overseal and Netherseal, is now considered part of Derbyshire. Apart from this, some parishes in historic Derbyshire, including Dore, Norton and Totley, are now in the City of Sheffield in South Yorkshire, having formerly been in the Scarsdale Wapentake.

From the time of the Norman Conquest the Royal Forest of Peak was established as a royal hunting reserve and it covered most of the north west of Derbyshire. It was administered by William Peverel and in 1305 it extended over about 100 square miles.

== Elizabethan ==
During the reign of Elizabeth I, several Elizabethan great houses were built including Chatsworth House (rebuilt in the late 17th century), Hardwick Hall, Padley Hall and Barlborough Hall.

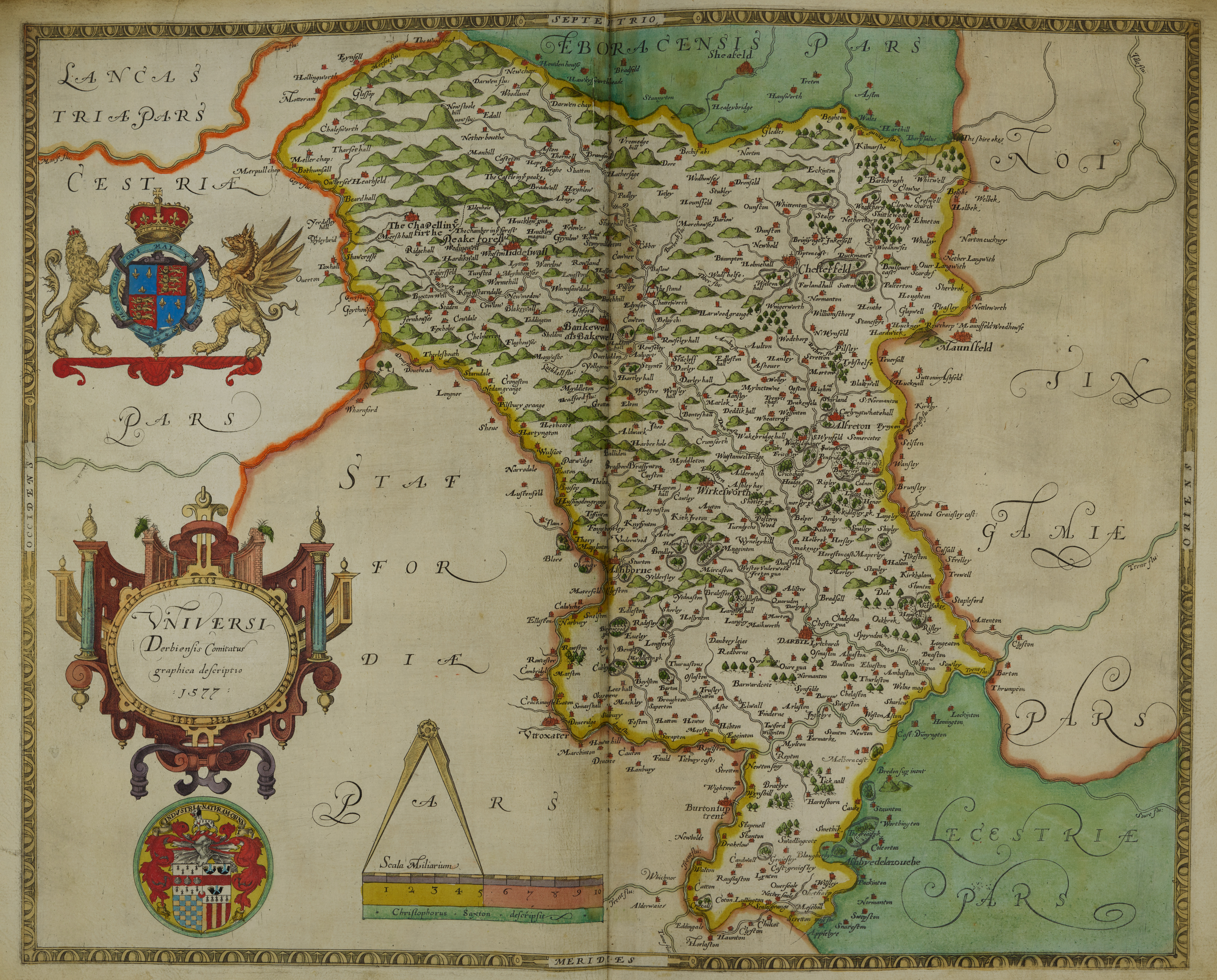
Hand-drawn map of Derbyshire by Christopher Saxton from 1577

Mary Queen of Scots was held in custody (on royal command) by George Talbot, 6th Earl of Shrewsbury at Chatsworth House several times between 1569 and 1584. She was permitted to visit the spa town of Buxton to ‘take the cure’ for her rheumatism most years from 1573 to 1584, under guard and for up to a month at a time.

== Stuart ==
Derbyshire was aligned to the Parliamentarians ("Roundheads") during the English Civil War of 1642–1646. Sir John Gell of Hopton Hall raised a regiment in Derbyshire and fortified Derby against threats from the Royalists ("Cavaliers"). In 1644 the Royalists were defeated at the battle of Egginton Heath. The Duke of Devonshire, William Cavendish of Chatsworth House, was a Royalist and went into exile, only returning with The Restoration of the monarchy in 1660. He repaired Bolsover Castle, which had been ruined to in order prevent it becoming a Royalist stronghold.

During the Great Plague of 1665–1666, the village of Eyam famously isolated itself to prevent spreading the bubonic plague to the surrounding towns and villages.

== Industrial Revolution ==
In the early 18th century, Richard Arkwright established cotton-spinning mills, using pioneering machinery, by the River Derwent at Cromford and Matlock Bath. The Cromford Mill, Masson Mills, Derby Silk Mill and Jedediah Strutt’s mills at Belper developed the industrial textile factory system. Derwent Valley Mills is now a UNESCO World Heritage Site. The Cromford and High Peak Railway was completed in 1831, to carry industrial goods between the Cromford Canal and the Peak Forest Canal at Whaley Bridge.

Limestone quarrying and lime burning has taken place around Buxton for centuries. Demand for lime (also known as quicklime) grew dramatically during the Industrial Revolution. The arrival of the Cromford and High Peak Railway through Buxton generated further expansion of quarrying. During the 19th century lime from Buxton was supplied to make soda ash in Northwich for the Lancashire cotton industry and for glass manufacture in St Helens.

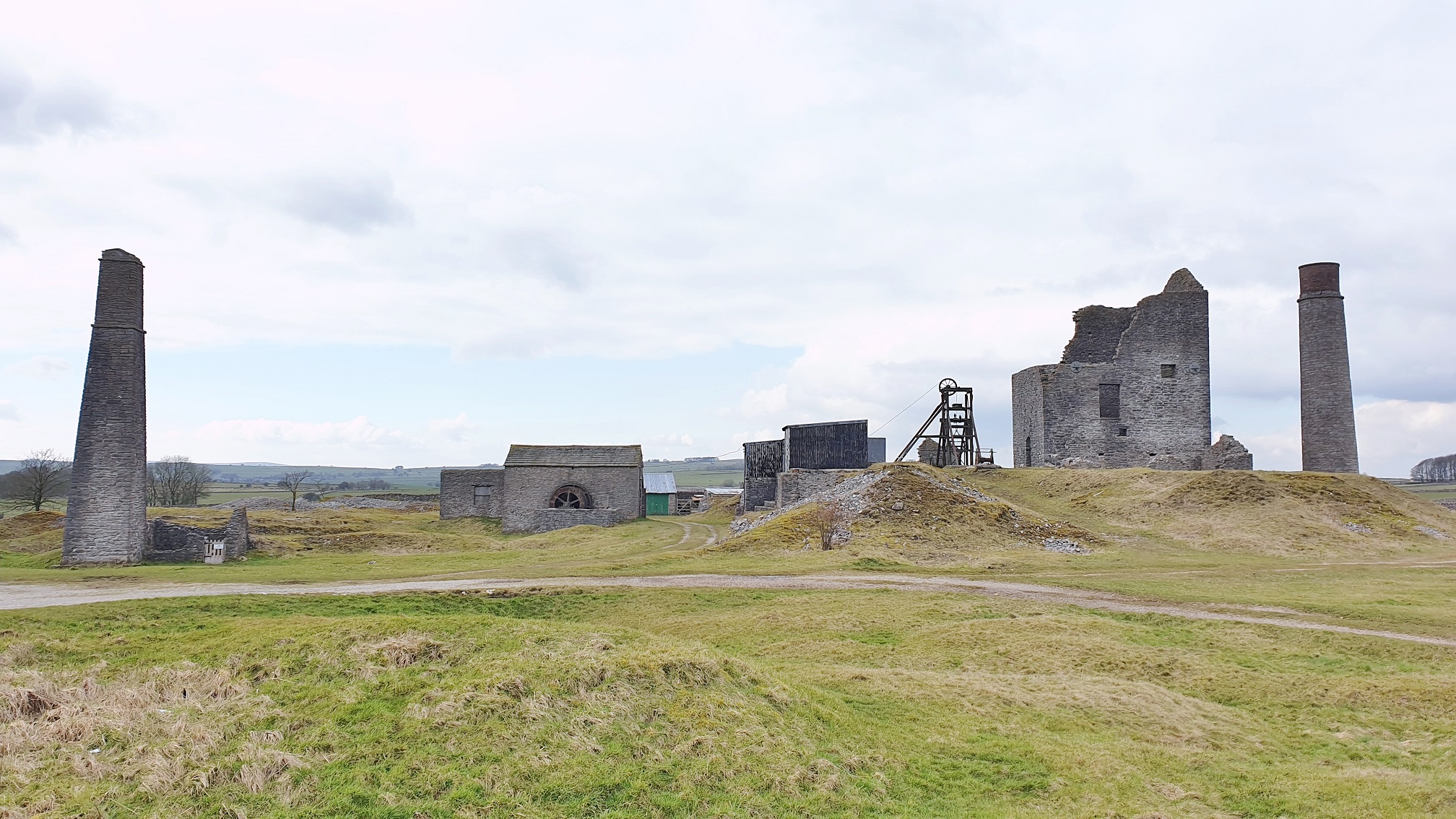
Magpie Mine

Lead has been mined in Derbyshire since Roman times. In the late 16th century watered-powered smelting mills, with furnaces fired by wood or charcoal, were introduced to smelt lead ore on an industrial scale. Magpie Mine near Bakewell, Lathkill Dale mines and the Beans and Bacon mine near Bonsall adopted innovative machinery to increase production throughout the 17th to 19th centuries.

Derby developed as an engineering centre in the 19th century and became a major railway manufacturing centre as the base for the North Midland Railway.

== Georgian and Victorian ==
Buxton and Matlock Bath were developed as spa towns during the 18th century. The Dukes of Devonshire commissioned the building of the Crescent and Buxton Baths for Buxton to rival the spa towns of Bath and Harrogate. In 1698 warm springs were discovered at Matlock Bath and by Victorian times it had become a fashionable spa destination. The advent of the railways in the 19th century brought much greater numbers of visitors from London and Manchester into the Peak District towns.

== 20th century ==
1. High Peak; 2. Derbyshire Dales; 3. South Derbyshire; 4. Erewash; 5. Amber Valley; 6. North East Derbyshire; 7. Chesterfield; 8. Bolsover; 9. Derby

Derbyshire County Council was established in 1889 and was reconstituted in 1972. The county is divided into 8 boroughs:

- Amber Valley Borough Council
- Erewash Borough Council
- Bolsover District Council
- Chesterfield Borough Council
- North East Derbyshire District Council
- High Peak Borough Council
- Derbyshire Dales District Council
- South Derbyshire District Council

Derby City Council became a separate unitary authority in 1997 but it remains part of the ceremonial county of Derbyshire.

== See also ==
- Derbyshire Domesday Book tenants-in-chief
- Derbyshire lead mining history
- Derbyshire (UK Parliament constituency)
- Grade I listed buildings in Derbyshire
- High Sheriff of Derbyshire
- Hundreds of Derbyshire
- List of castles in Derbyshire
- List of emblems of Derbyshire
- List of estates of the nobility in Derbyshire
- Scheduled monuments in Derbyshire
- Sherwood Foresters (Nottinghamshire and Derbyshire Regiment)
- Victoria County History
