= Barmote court =

Court in the lead mining districts of Derbyshire, England

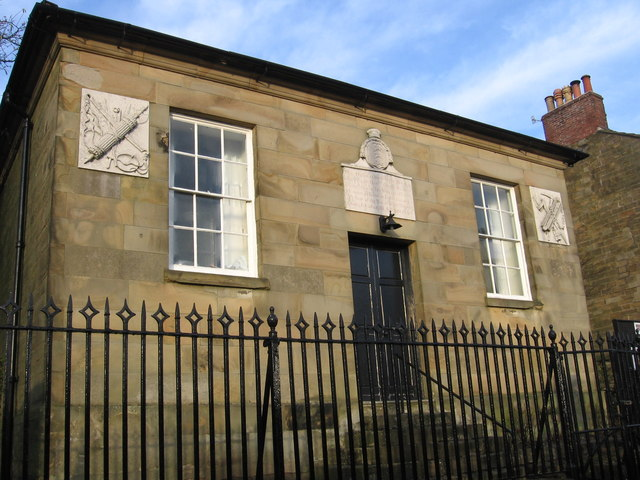
Moot Hall, Wirksworth

A barmote court (also written berghmote, barghmote, bargemote and barmoot) is a court held in the lead mining districts of Derbyshire, England, for the purpose of determining the customs peculiar to the industry and also for the settlements of any disputes which may arise in connection with it.

== History ==
The barmote courts were set up in 1288, their jurisdiction extending to both the crown lands of the Duchy of Lancaster and those under individual ownership, comprising seven clearly defined districts. Great barmote courts with wider powers were in place by the fifteenth century, meeting at Easter and Michaelmas. The courts had twenty-four jurors, and were run by the barmaster and a steward. An appeal from the jurisdiction of the courts lies by way of certiorari, removing proceedings to the King's Bench Division of the High Court of Justice.

Noting that "the Mineral Laws and Customs of the King's Field ... [were] uncertain and undefined, and ... in many respects inapplicable to the present Mining Operations", the High Peak Mining Customs and Mineral Courts Act 1851 and the Derbyshire Mining Customs and Mineral Courts Act 1852 were enacted, declaring that "the Mineral Laws and Customs ... shall be such as are mentioned and comprised in this Act, and no other alleged Custom or Practice shall be valid". The areas over which the courts could exercise their jurisdiction were:

1851 Act	1852 Act
in the Hundred of High Peak, the whole of the King's Field, comprising the liberties or districts of Castleton, Bradwell, Hucklow, Winster, Moniash, Taddington, and Upper Haddon; elsewhere within the Hundred, those lands over which the Duchy of Lancaster is entitled to mineral duties	the King's Field found in that part of the Soke and Wapentake of Wirksworth not within the Hundred of High Peak; the manors or liberties of Ashford, Hartington, Peak Forest, Tideswell, Crich (excepting certain proprietors of limestone), Stoney Middleton and Eyam (excepting certain "ancient freeholds" therein), Youlgreave, and Litton, provided that any such lands therein were subject to mineral customs on 30 June 1852

While giving certainty to the courts' territorial limits, this had the effect of ousting their criminal jurisdiction, as well as matters relating to dower and tithes.

While the Acts provide for subpoenas and inspection of property, there are no provisions governing interrogatories or disclosure of documents.

== Present day ==
There are two barmote courts, one at Monyash covering the High Peak, and one at Wirksworth covering the Low Peak. In 1814, the Monyash court moved to Wirksworth, and since 1994, the two have met together, once a year, in April. In line with tradition, bread, cheese, clay pipes, and tobacco are provided at the meetings, and a representative of the monarch (who is the Lord of the Field) attends.

The courts' archival records are largely held at the Derbyshire Record Office.

While most current meetings have been ceremonial, the courts' jurisdiction still exists, and in 2013 the Low Peak Barmote Court was called upon to rule on lead mining rights in a cavern in Castleton, Derbyshire.

== See also ==
- Moot Hall, Wirksworth
- Stannary court
- Warden's court

== Notes ==
=== Treatises ===
- Hardy, William (1748). The Miner's Guide: Or, Compleat Miner. Sheffield: Francis Lister.
- Tapping, Thomas (1851). A Treatise on the High Peak Mining Customs and Mineral Courts Act, 1851. London: Shaw & Sons.
- Tapping, Thomas (1854). A Treatise on the Derbyshire Mining Customs and Mineral Court Act, 1852. London: Shaw & Sons.
- MacSwinney, Robert Forster (1884). "Derbyshire Rights, Courts, and Customs—Remaining Local Rights and Customs". The Law of Mines, Quarries and Minerals. London: W. Maxwell & Son. pp. 500–522.

=== Jurisprudence ===
- Wright v Pitt, LR 3 Ch 809 (1870).
- Wake v Hall, 8 AC 195 (1883).
