= Derbyshire lead mining history =

History of lead mining in Derbyshire

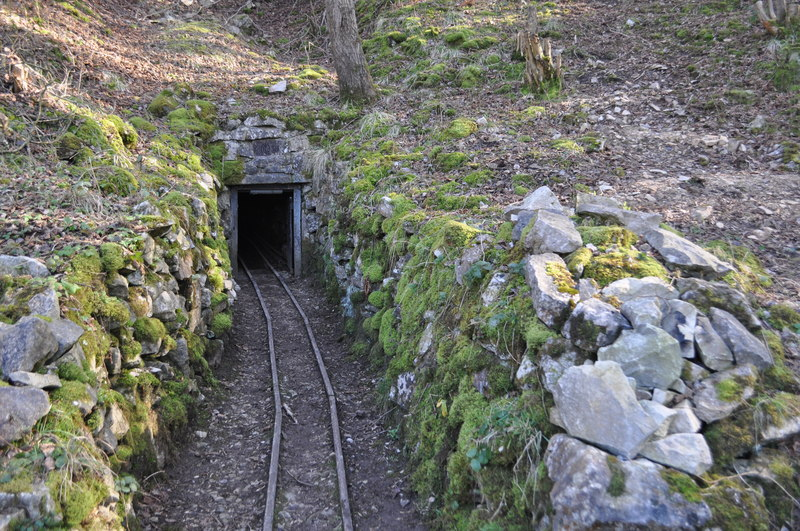
Goodluck Mine in Via Gellia

This article details some of the history of lead mining in Derbyshire, England.

== Background ==
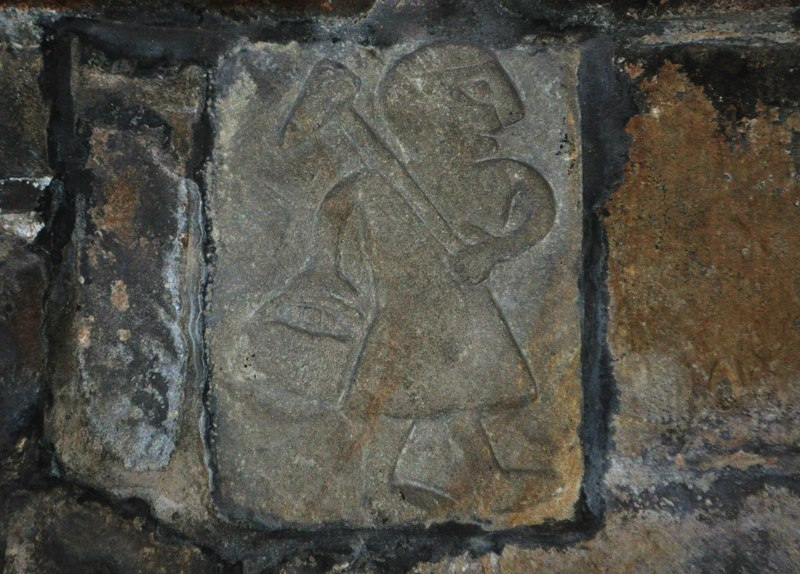
T'owd Man, Wirksworth

Lutudarum (believed to have been at either Wirksworth or nearby Carsington) was the administrative centre of the Roman lead mining industry in Britain. Numerous lead ingots have been found in Derbyshire, in Sussex and around Hull with LVT, LVTVM or LVTVDARVM marked on them.

It has been claimed that Odin Mine, near Castleton, one of the oldest lead mines in England, may have been worked in the tenth century or even as early as Roman Britain, but it was certainly productive in the 1200s. Derbyshire lead mines are mentioned in the Pipe Rolls. Recent analysis of a Swiss ice-core extracted in 2013 indicates that levels of lead in atmospheric pollution between 1170 and 1216 were as high as those during the Industrial Revolution and correlate accurately with lead production from Peak District mines, the main European source at the time. On one of the walls in Wirksworth Church is a crude stone carving, found nearby at Bonsall and placed in the church in the 1870s. Probably executed in Anglo-Saxon times, it shows a man carrying a kibble or basket in one hand and a pick in the other. He is a lead miner. The north choir aisle of Wirksworth church is dominated by a far more ostentatious monument, a large ornate alabaster chest tomb, a memorial to Ralph Gell of Hopton, who died in 1563. The simple figure of the miner bears witness to the fact that for centuries the people of Wirksworth and their neighbours relied on lead mining. Ralph Gell's imposing tomb is evidence that a few people became rich and powerful from the trade.

While Derbyshire lead made Gell and others rich, for poor families it was both a living and an adventure, with the possibility of a better life from a lucky find. The industry was organised in a way that gave a measure of independence to many of them. Mining was hard and dangerous work: death, illness and injury came from poisonous lead dust, underground floods, falling rock, methane gas in shale workings and lack of oxygen in badly ventilated galleries. From the later years of the 17th century gunpowder introduced a further hazard. Nonetheless, the thousands of shafts, hillocks and ruined buildings in the limestone landscape of the old lead mining areas, and the miles of galleries underground, make it plain that the veins of lead were intensively exploited. In the words of a petition to King Charles I "many thousand people are dailie imployed in the lead mynes, to the greatt proffitt of your Majestie ... and to the whole Comonwealth ... in getting great quantities of lead for the use of the Kingdome in generall, and in transporting the rest to forraigne Nations...".

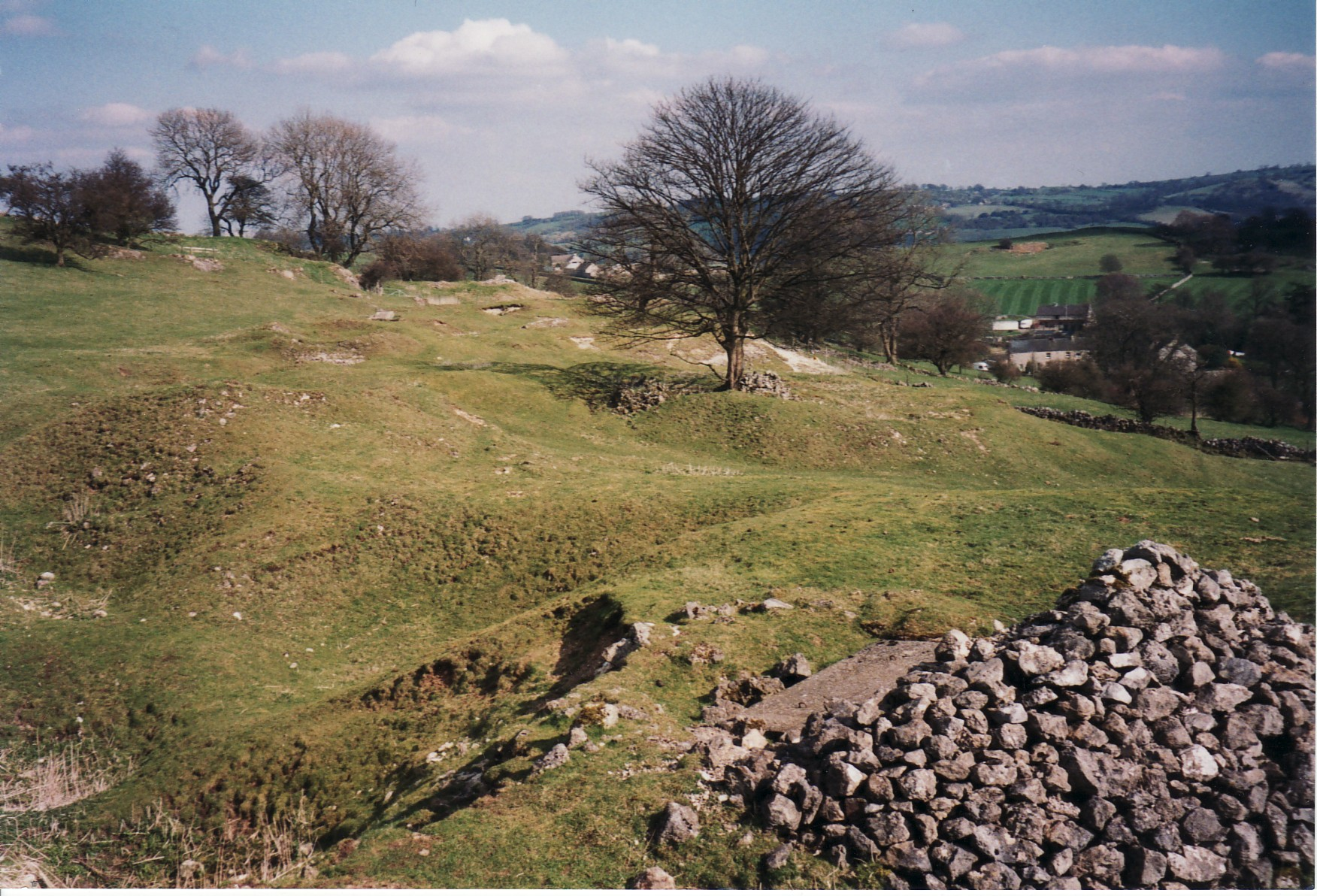
Smithycove Mine, Hopton

By the 17th century lead was second in importance in the national economy only to wool. It was essential for the roofs of public buildings and the new houses being built in every part of the country by the nobility and gentry. All houses, including farmhouses and cottages by then, had glazed windows, with lead glazing bars. It was the only material for water storage and piping. Every army used it as ammunition. There was a thriving export trade as well as the home market and the Wirksworth area was the main source of the ore.

Wirksworth was the administrative centre of one of the hundreds of Derbyshire. The Wirksworth Hundred was still known by the archaic term wapentake. Lead ore was Crown property in most places and the mining area of Derbyshire under royal control was known as the King's Field, with two separately administered divisions, the High and Low Peaks, each further divided into liberties, based on parishes. Wirksworth Wapentake was the Low Peak area of the King's Field. At different times there were liberties based on Wirksworth, Middleton-by-Wirksworth, Cromford, Brassington, Matlock, Elton, Middleton-by-Youlgreave, Bonsall, Hopton and Carsington, and from 1638 until 1654 there was a separate liberty for the Dovegang, 200 acres (0.81 km^{2}) on Cromford Moor which had become extremely productive after being drained by the first of the Derbyshire drainage schemes, or soughs.

There had always been lead mining in and around Wirksworth. This is limestone country and the fissures characteristic of limestone contained rich deposits of minerals, and especially of galena: lead ore. The Romans mined there and left inscribed "pigs", or ingots, of smelted lead as evidence. In the 9th century Repton Abbey owned mines at Wirksworth and when the abbey was destroyed by Danish troops in 874 they were taken by their Mercian puppet king Ceolwulf. They remained in royal hands after the Norman Conquest of England and paid royalties to the Crown for centuries afterwards. Lead mining and smelting was an established industry in 1086, when the mines at Wirksworth and Bakewell were recorded in the Domesday Book.

== Mining methods ==
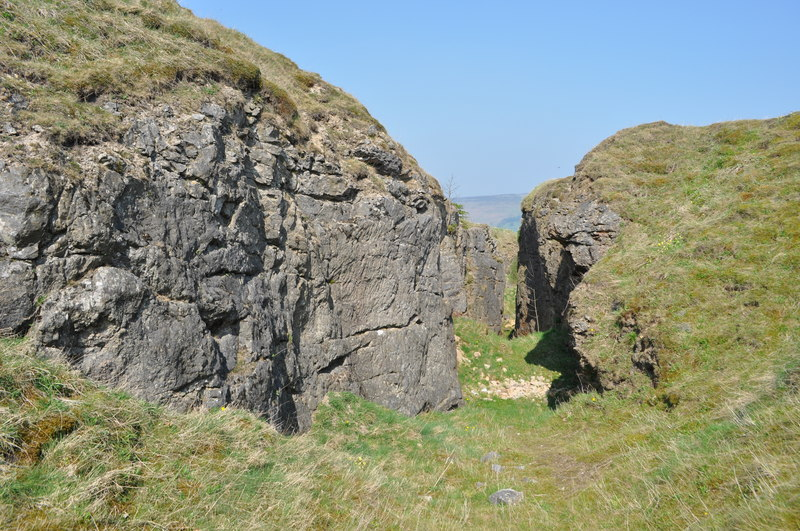
Dirtlow Rake near Pindale

Lead had traditionally been found by following veins from surface outcroppings, particularly in "rakes" or vertical fissures. By the 17th century, however, most surface lead had been mined and prospecting was achieved by less direct methods. Miners searched for surface signs that were similar to known lead-rich areas, they checked ploughed and other disturbed land for traces of ore, and they checked for signs in plants and trees and poorly performing crops, since lead is poisonous to most living things. They used probes to check for signs of ore in soil a few feet under the surface and dug exploratory holes or trenches in promising places. This was usually done to choose the best places to sink shafts ahead of existing working and the rules defined when and where these activities could be carried out.

The miners sank their shafts in turns of up to 90 feet (27 metres), each turn being a few yards away from the bottom of the preceding one, along a gallery which may have been the working level reached by the earlier shaft. They climbed up and down their shafts using either footholes in the shaft walls or stemples, wooden steps built into the sides, an exhausting and dangerous way to start and finish a day's work. These climbing shafts were usually within the miners' coe, the limestone-walled cabin in which they stored tools, a change of clothes and food. Where the mine was on a hillside the vein could often be reached via an adit or tunnel driven into the slope.

Ore was brought to the surface up a winding shaft outside the coe. The miners' equipment included picks, hammers and wedges to split the rock, wiskets or baskets to contain it, corves or sledges to drag it to the shaft bottom, and windlasses or stows, to lift it to the surface. In later years underground transport was improved by replacing corves by wagons, often running on wooden or metal rails. A good example of an 18th-century wooden railway can be found in the Merry Tom mine, near Via Gellia. The miners avoided the need to excavate hard rock whenever they could and where it was unavoidable sometimes resorted to fire-setting. A fire was built against the rock face after mining had finished for the day and allowed to burn through the night. Fragmentation of the heated rock was increased by throwing water on to it. The rule about fire-setting only after the end of the day's work was important because in the confined mines the smoke was deadly. Fire-setting was a skilled technique and was used sparingly for that reason as well as because of the disruption caused by the smoke and the danger from splintering rock.

== 16th-century technical change ==
After a mid-16th-century slump the industry recovered, new mines were opened on Middleton Moor, and production increased, a recovery mainly due to technical developments. While traditional extraction methods had persisted there were vital changes in the ways in which ore was prepared for smelting and in the smelting process itself.

=== Bole smelting ===
The traditional smelter was a bole, a large fire built on a hill and relying on wind power. It functioned best with large pieces of rich ore known as bing and could not deal with anything small enough to pass through a half-inch mesh riddle. The bole smelter therefore resulted in large amounts of ore accumulating on waste heaps. It required two days of strong wind and could only function when the conditions were favourable.

=== Smelting mills ===
In the late 16th century wind power was abandoned and the smelting blast was provided by a bellows driven first by foot, to an ore hearth, and later by water-power in a smelting mill. The mills were fuelled by "white coal", which was in fact kiln-dried branch wood. Wood was preferred to charcoal for the main furnace, which smelted ore from the mines, as charcoal generated more heat than this furnace required. Drying the wood eliminated smoke, which would have made it difficult for the smelters to keep the necessary close observation of the process. Charcoal was used in a second furnace, which resmelted the slag from the first, and required greater heat. Draught for the furnaces came from two large bellows driven by the water wheels. Lead ore of all grades was first broken or ground again into finer particles and rewashed to produce very pure ore for the furnace. These smelters could deal with much finer particles of ore and new techniques were introduced to provide them.

=== Dressing ===
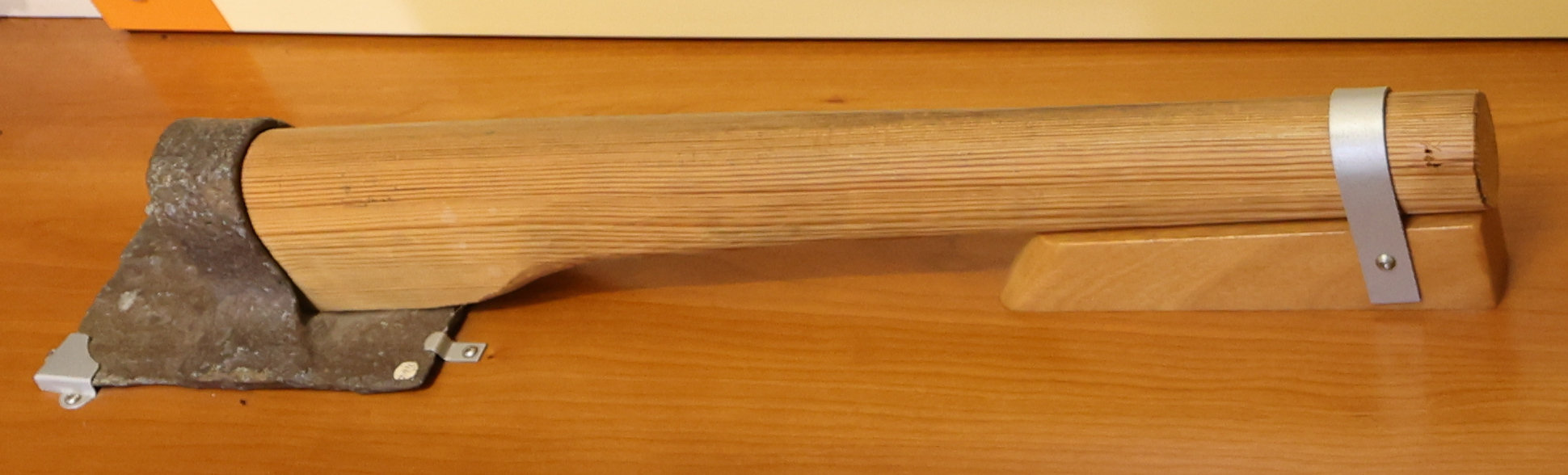
A bucker hammer

Before a miner could sell his ore he had to dress it. Dressing was the process of extracting the ore from the rock in which it was embedded and washing it, a further refining process. In the days of bole smelting the ore was roughly washed clean of waste minerals and dirt before being riddled for bing ore. The ore for the new smelters was smashed, or crushed, into pieces about the size of peas. This was done by hand, using a hammer called a bucker or, in larger mines, on a crushing circle, where a horse dragged a roller round a paved circle on which the ore was placed. Crushed ore was washed either by running water over it in a sloping trough called a buddle or by placing it in a sieve fine enough to prevent any ore particles passing through. The sieve was then plunged several times into a trough. In each case the object was to allow the heavier, lead-rich, particles to sink, enabling those containing lighter, unwanted minerals to be skimmed off the top and removed. These processes were then repeated at the smelter. By the 17th century new mines were being opened, shafts driven deeper, and old waste heaps were yielding new supplies for the smelters.

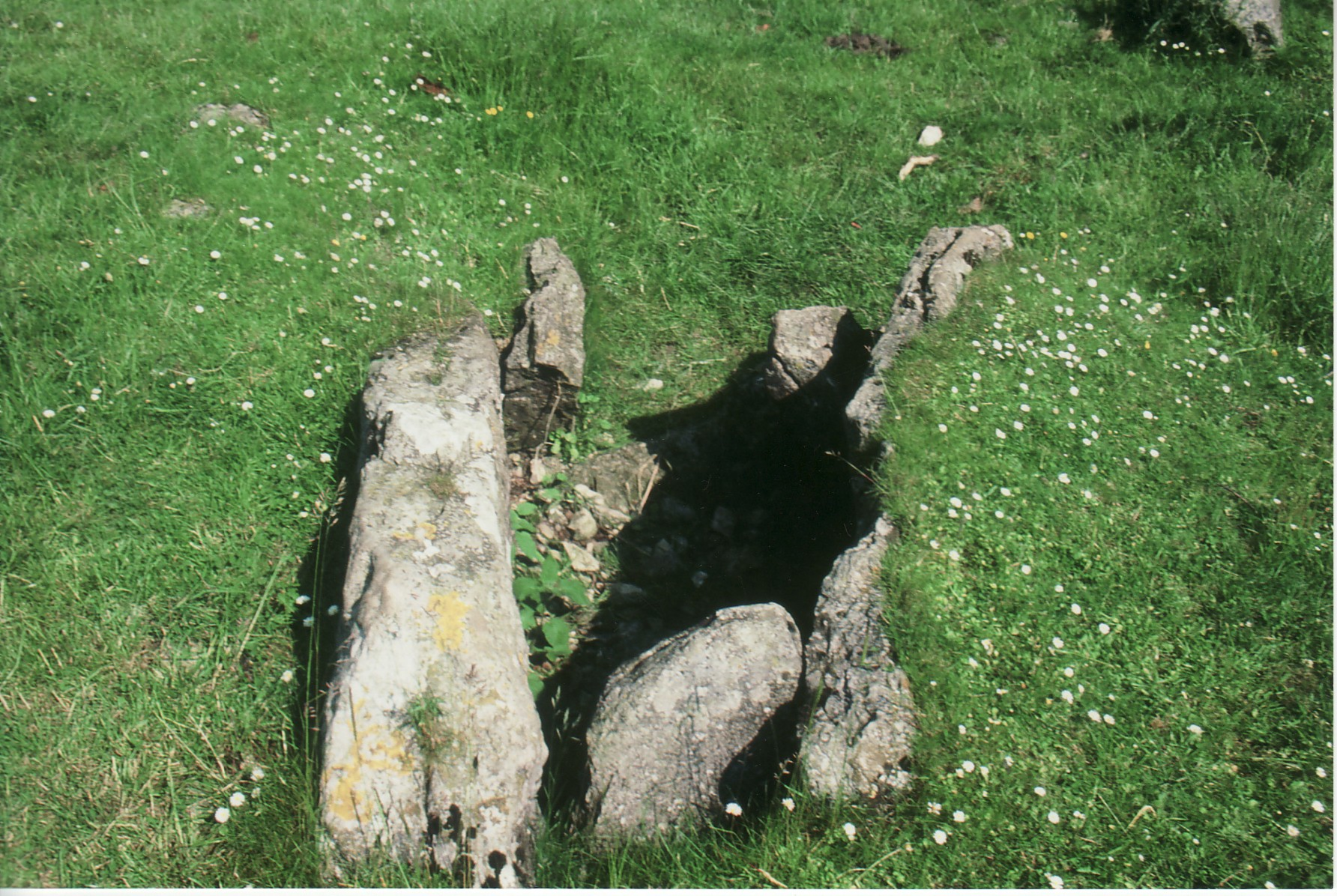
Remains of stone washing buddle at Perseverance Mine on Carsington Pasture

== Mining customs ==
Everything about the old lead industry, from the mining of ore to its sale, stemmed from the ancient claim of the monarch to all mineral rights. The whole structure was designed to enable the Duchy of Lancaster, a royal possession, to collect the king's royalties and, since these were farmed out, the miners paid them to the king's farmer. By the 17th century the local holder of the mineral rights was also the barmaster, who ran the industry, helped by deputies responsible for the liberties, and by the miners' juries of the Barmote Court. The lead industry is long gone, but its traditions are still maintained and the barmaster and the jury still meet in the Moot Hall in Wirksworth.

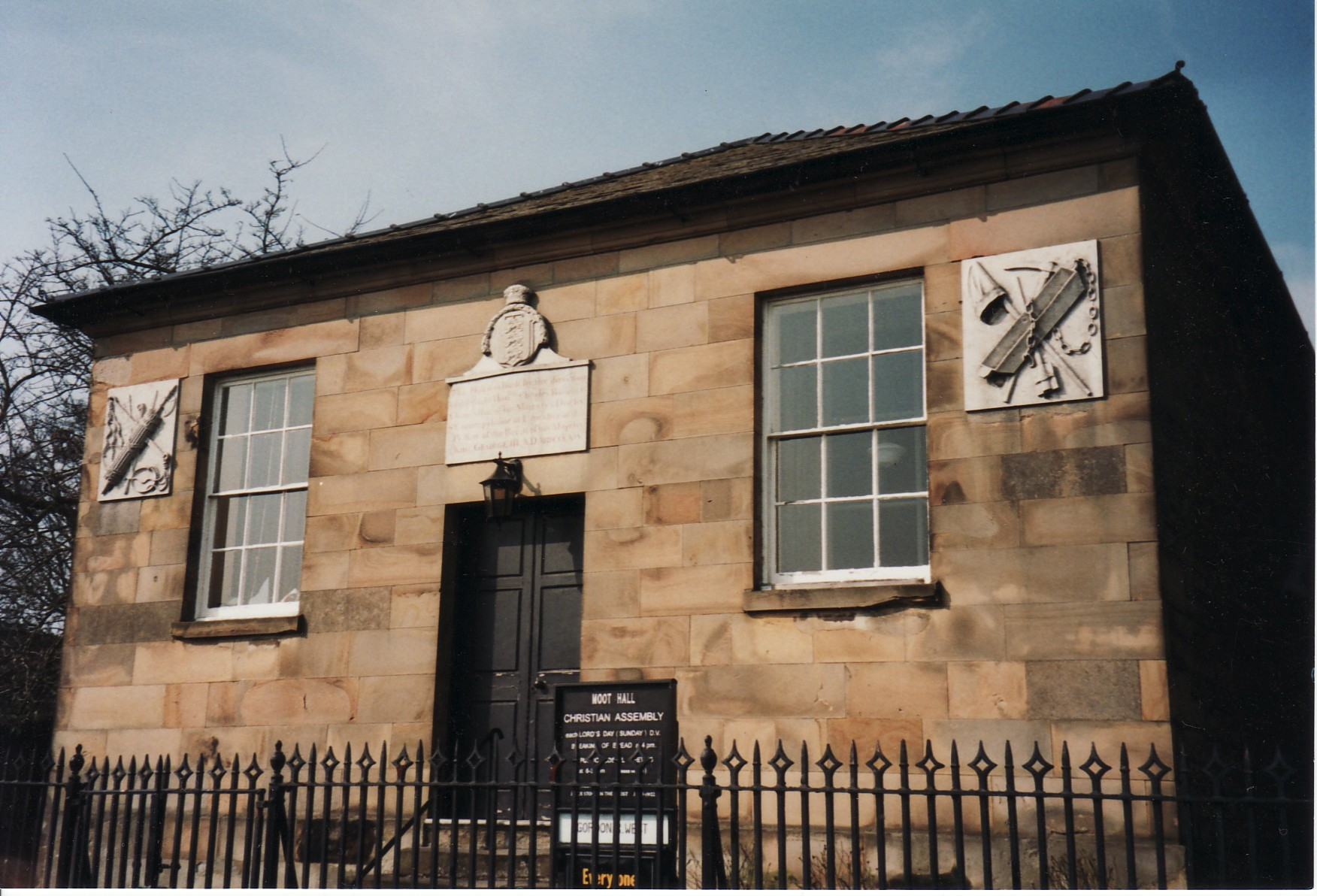
Moot Hall, Wirksworth

It was the royal possession of the mineral rights and the royal wish to encourage lead mining, that dictated the two characteristic features of so-called "free mining". Any man who could demonstrate to the barmaster that he had discovered a significant amount of ore was allowed to open a mine and retain the title to it as long as he continued to work it, and, secondly, mining took precedence over land ownership. No land owner or farmer could interfere with lead mining, though there were many attempts to limit its damage. In 1620 the Duchy of Lancaster's tenants at Brassington complained that lead mining was poisoning their cattle. In 1663 the Brassington manor court forbade miners from taking water from the village well to wash ore, on pain of a fine of 1 shilling, and in 1670 imposed fines of 3/4d on miners who left shafts uncovered or raised heaps of soil and waste minerals against fences, allowing cattle to climb over them. But the customs raised the possibility of ordinary families making a living independently of farmers or other employers and in the regular conflict between miners and landowners in the Wirksworth area the miners usually managed to hang on to them, though they did lose some of their fights.

=== King's farmers and chief barmasters ===
The lease for the Duchy of Lancaster's lead mine duties, which included the office of chief barmaster, provided its holder with income and regulatory authority over the local mining industry. The Duchy leased these rights for £110, alongside annual payments of £72 for the duties and £1 6s 8d for the barmastership, with lessees frequently subleasing or reselling the rights at a profit.

=== Chief barmasters and the 24 ===
At dinner in Wirksworth after meetings of the 17th-century Barmote Court, the landlord of the inn had three tables for those attending the Court. There was the "24 table", where the members of the 24-man jury sat, and where he charged 8d per head, "the barmasters' table", at 10d a head, and a table where "gentlemen's dinners" cost 1 shilling each. The gentlemen drank sack or claret with their dinner; the men were served with beer. The bill was paid by the king's farmer and chief barmaster. There were usually about a dozen gentlemen, some of whom were members of the jury, while others were there to present a case to the Court. Also among the gentlemen were the steward of the court, who was a lawyer and who conducted the sessions. When the chief barmaster for the Wapentake, always a man of wealth and rank, was a local gentleman such as Sir John Gell of Hopton or his son John, the 2nd baronet, he often attended the Court himself. If the current chief barmaster was an absentee member of the gentry or nobility he relied on his deputy barmasters.

In addition to helping the barmasters to carry out their duties the 24 jurors brought practical experience to bear when the Barmote Court was adjudicating in disputes and trials. The main requirement of the jurymen was that they should be knowledgeable in mining matters and they included both working miners and, when it was thought necessary, local gentry.

=== Deputy barmasters ===
The deputy barmasters whom the chief barmaster appointed were experienced local men. Some of them were yeoman farmer/miners and others local gentlemen. The deputy barmasters actually ran the system. It was they who initiated much of the business of the Court. It was they, in administering the rules, who determined whether a miner should have a particular mine or whether another should lose one. Their duties required them to be able to read, write and keep account of granting and removing title to mines and of ore production and the duties levied on it. As ore was brought from a mine, it was measured by the dish and the barmaster collected each 13th dish, a royalty or duty known as lot. This was the barmaster's reckoning. A further duty of sixpence a load (9 dishes) was paid by the merchants who bought the ore from the miners. This second duty was called cope.

=== Giving a mine ===
The barmaster or his deputy granted title in a mine, the usual name for which was grove or groove, on receipt of proof that it was viable. The proof was a standard container, a dish, filled with about 65 pounds (29 kilograms) of ore from the mine in question. Every dish was calibrated by the barmaster twice a year against a brass standard dish. The miner thus granted title to the mine was said to have freed it, either for old if a development in an existing mine, or for new in the case of a new discovery. He was given permission to work 2 meers of ground, known as founder meers, with no restriction on width or depth. A third meer was the king's, and other miners were each allowed to open a further meer, taker meers, along the vein. The miner marked each meer with his possessions or stows (a miniature version of the stows or windlass used to wind the ore from the shaft). A meer was 29 yards (27 m), in the Wirksworth Wapentake.

Since the course of a vein of lead was unpredictable, there were many disputes caused by one group of miners following a vein into another mine. There were occasions when possession was disputed by physical means.

=== Title-holding and record keeping ===
The deputy barmasters were responsible for settling disputes over ownership or of arresting or suspending operation of mines pending decisions of the Barmote Court. They could withdraw title whenever a mine was left unworked. They checked the mines regularly and used their knives to nick the stows at any neglected mine. After three nicks at weekly intervals title could be transferred to another miner. The mining rules required working shareholders in a mine to pull their weight. Any who did not were dispossessed, after a warning at the Barmote Court. Typical was this injunction from the court on 2 April 1630: "Wee saie that Thomas Taylor Henry Lowe and John Wooley shall come within tenn daies of warning given them by the Barrmaster and shall keepe Thomas Redforde companie at their groves in Home Rake or else to loose theire parte."

The deputy barmasters kept records of all changes of title and of the amounts of ore measured and the amounts of lot ore and cope collected at their regular reckonings at the mines. The lot and cope accounts involved quite complicated arithmetic. The information given included the period covered, the name of the miner or mine (occasionally both were given), the amount of ore mined, the number of dishes of lot ore received, the amount of ore sold to each buyer and the sum of money chargeable to each buyer for cope. Traditional methods were used at the reckonings; barmasters carried knives "to worke uppon a sticke the nomber of dishes of oare as they were measured which is usuall to be done at a reckoning". Many of their records have survived.

=== Accidents ===
In conjunction with the jury of 24 sitting at the Barmote Courts, the deputy barmasters adjudicated in disputes and enforced compliance with the customs of the mines. Their duties extended to acting as the coroner in the case of fatal accidents, where a specially summoned jury of twelve or thirteen local miners decided the cause of death. In an 18th-century example the Brassington barmaster, Edward Ashton, followed the rules after a death in Throstle Nest mine.

Wirksworth Wapentake March 26th 1761. We, whose names are under written, being this day summoned by Mr. Edward Ashton, Bar-Master for the Liberty of Brassington, to a groove called by the name of Throstle Nest on Brassington Pasture; to enquire into the cause of the death of T.W. now lying before us; accordingly we have been down the shaft to the Foot thereof, and down one sump or turn to the foot thereof, and on a gate North-wardly about sixteen yards to the Forefield, where the deceased had been at work; and by the information of William Briddon who was working near him; it appears that a large stone fell upon him out of the roof, and it is our opinions the said stone was the cause of his death.

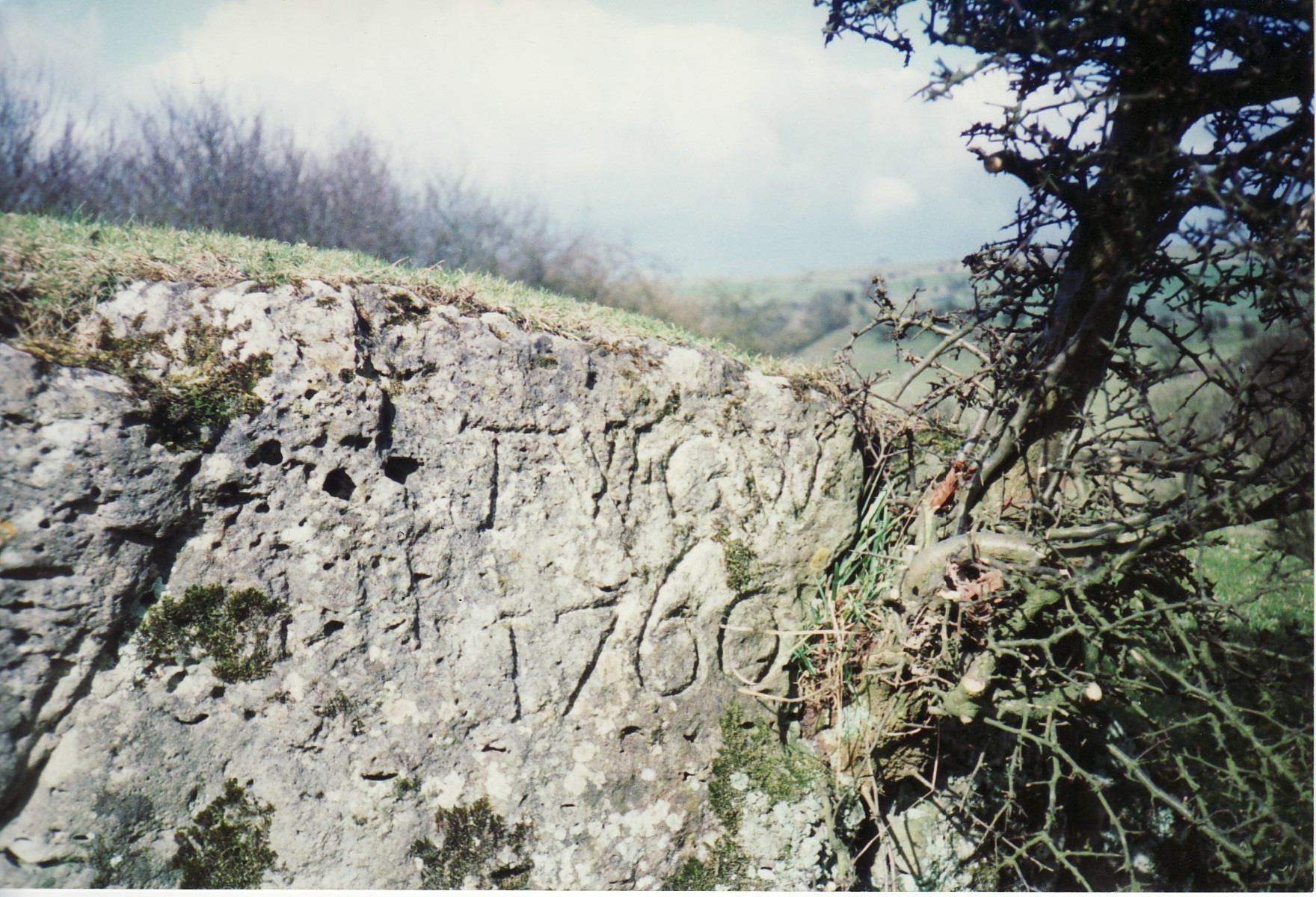
Datestone of TW, the miner killed in Throstlenest Mine in 1761, carved on limestone outcrop a few feet from the mineshaft

=== Structure of industry ===
The free mining arrangement under the rules of the Duchy of Lancaster was the normal state of affairs in the Duchy manor of Wirksworth. The Duchy's lessee of the mineral rights at the end of the 16th century, Gilbert, Earl of Shrewsbury, had established his right to the dues of lot and cope against attempts by local landowners to assert right to mines on their land. Shrewsbury's success embedded the old rules and facilitated free mining.

There was one independent area within the Wapentake, Griffe Grange, near Brassington, held by the Gell family of Hopton since Ralph Gell had leased it from Dale Abbey and bought it from the Crown Commissioners at the dissolution of the religious houses by Henry VIII. The Gells, however, ran their mines under similar rules to those in the Duchy, the only difference being that the miners paid their dues to them. Attempts by other landowners to establish the same rights as the Gells were largely unsuccessful. An example occurred at Elton, where the landowner, Francis Foljambe, prevented the application of Duchy rules, employing wage labourers in the Elton mines and seeking sanction for his action in the courts. The Duchy Court, however, issued an injunction against him in 1627, instructing him "to conveane or execute noe other suite or suites hereafter att the Comon Lawe ... concerning the lott and copp and lead mynes in Elton". This ruling was applied in all the Duchy liberties, though there was a renewal of opposition from landowners after the Restoration of 1660.

For historical reasons the structure of the industry was different in the High Peak where, mainly because of very long leases, there had been a blurring of the Duchy's authority, and the two largest landowners, the Manners and Cavendish families, maintained claims to mining rights and dues. The miners fought hard, physically and in the courts, to obtain the free mining rights enjoyed in the Wirksworth Wapentake. The Manners family met them head-on, refused all attempts to establish free mining, and employed miners as day labourers in their mines. Their Cavendish neighbours at Chatsworth, after a period of conflict, adopted the same pattern as the Gells at Griffe Grange, collecting the dues from mines run by Duchy of Lancaster rules.

The operation of the old rules and customs in the Wirksworth Wapentake did not prevent the development of a complicated structure there. The barmasters' ore accounts, identifying mines and/or proprietors, reveal a mixture of free mining, ownership of large mines by rich entrepreneurs and the rewashing of old spoil heaps. Where there was a rich source of ore and especially where access required dewatering, the mines were owned by venture capitalists employing miners either as contracted groups, who considered themselves as free miners negotiating a price for their work or, more rarely, as wage labourers. The barmasters' accounts for 1653 show that the ore from the Brassington, Middleton and Wirksworth liberties, all low producers at the time, consisted of small amounts mined by a large number of names. Clearly, in these liberties, at this time, it was the small-time miners, most of whom would have had other sources of income, usually farming, who were paying their dues and selling to the lead merchants and smelters. In a fourth liberty, Cromford, the picture was different. With the Dovegang dewatered by Vermuyden's Sough (see below), the output there dwarfed the combined output of the other three liberties, and 51% of it came from mines owned by the rich lead merchant Lionel Tynley. 88% came from four sources, while the rest was mined by 45 independent miners. Finally, 6,108 loads (about 1,527 tons), or 23% of the total ore sold in the four liberties, was won from old hillocks by so-called "cavers".

== Pollution ==
Lead is poisonous to both plants and animals. For people the smelting processes are the most dangerous – the restored smelter at Spitewinter, near Chesterfield, stands a few yards from Belland Lane, belland being lead poisoning. The current owners of the smelter on the site of the former Mill Close mine at Darley Bridge have bought much of the adjoining land and turned arable and pasture into woodland, to avoid the danger to crops and animals.

The danger to plants and animals, particularly from washing or "buddling", has been known for centuries and the nuisance to the people of Brassington described above was typical of the conflict between farmers and miners. In the 1680s Sir John Gell II gave his opinion during such a dispute. "For buddling ... I have heard that miners have been indicted for it, and the freeholders and occupiers of land are much prejudiced by it. It sets the cattle upon the belland, which is destructive to the cattle and horses and often kills them."

In 1794 several groups of Wensley miners who had buddled mine waste in the river Derwent above and below Darley Bridge were brought to court, accused of polluting the river. Witnesses described the river as being muddied as far down-river as a mile below Cromford Bridge, and a Matlock publican claimed to have been prevented from his usual practice of using river water for his brewing by the state of the Derwent. He had had to sink a well to stay in business. Mining law was cited by both sides. The miners quoted the custom which allowed them to wash their ore, while plaintiffs replied with the law which stipulated that sludge from washing should be emptied into "some convenient place within their quarter cord (which is a space of seven yards and a quarter, or the fourth part of a meer, on each side of their vein)" to prevent pollution of the adjacent land. The miners, who had carted their ore to the river, as being easier than carting water to their mine – their mine was dry and there is a steep hill from Wensley to the Derwent – lost their case.

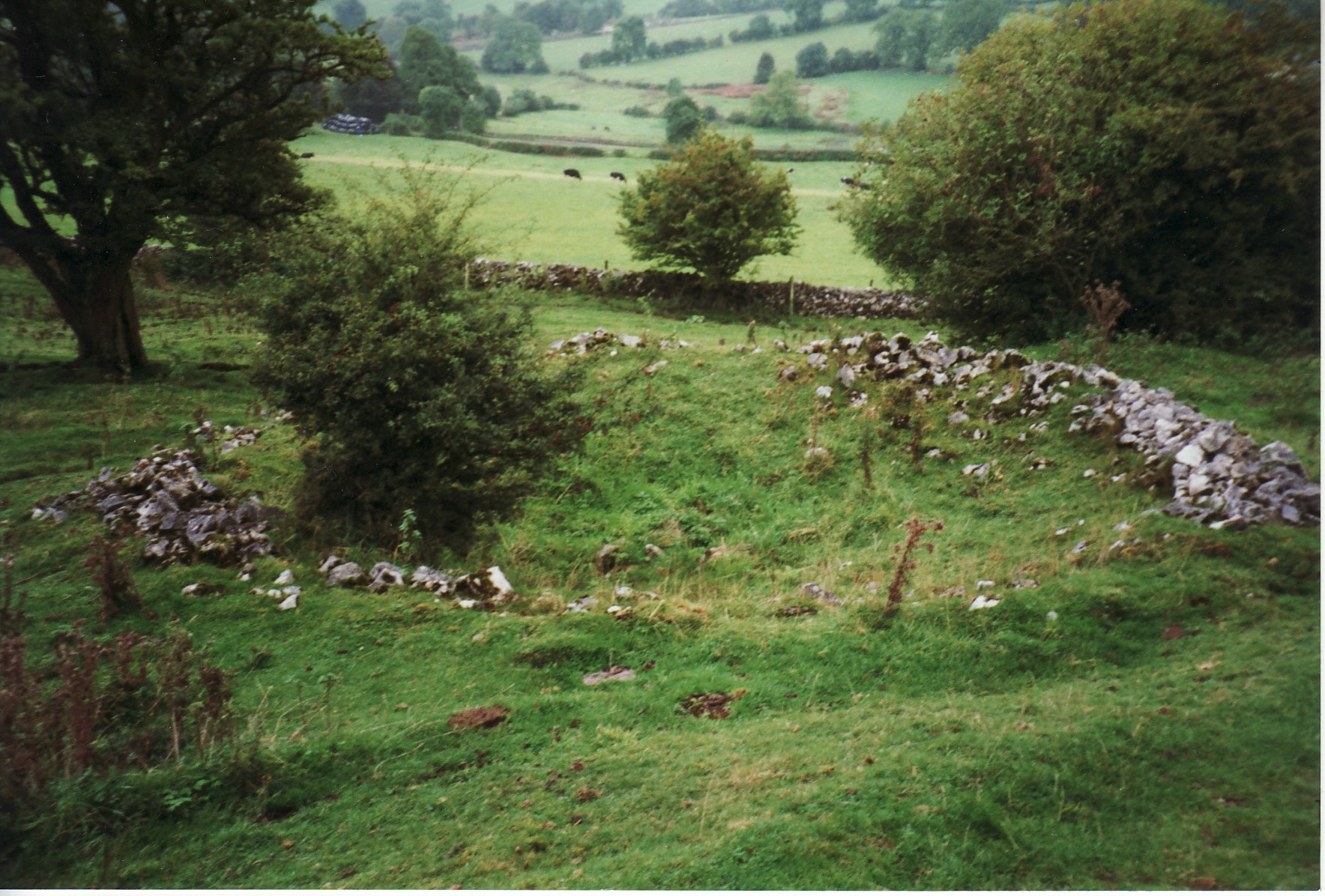
Settling pond for washing sludge at Corsehill Mine, Brassington

In addition to the mining law to prevent water pollution quoted in the Wensley case, often ignored by the miners, attempts to prevent pollution of farmland included tree planting to deter cattle from grazing near mining operations – there are many examples of trees planted on the lines of veins in the old mining areas as well as the recent afforestation at Darley Bridge. Smelting mills had chimneys to dissipate the fumes from the ore hearths. These were only partly successful as the mills were often sited in or near to settlements, which suffered from lead deposits from the chimneys. The mills also polluted the streams which powered their bellows. Cupolas, described below, conveyed their emissions via tunnels to chimneys, which were often a considerable distance from the smelter. The limited success achieved by these efforts is exemplified by the naming of Belland Lane.

== Mine drainage ==
Until the 17th century mining had usually been abandoned when the work reached the water table. Efforts at draining lead mines by horse-powered pumps, or "engines", had little success. In the later years of the industry mines were successfully drained by hydraulic, steam, internal combustion and electric power, but the first successes were achieved by soughs, drainage tunnels driven into flooded veins to allow the water to run off. Dr Rieuwerts has provided a comprehensive gazetteer of the Derbyshire lead mining soughs. By lowering the water table and opening up large new deposits of lead ore, they transformed the industry.

The first sough, designed by Sir Cornelius Vermuyden, knighted for his work in draining the East Anglian fens, was driven over a twenty-year period from a point on Cromford Hill, between Cromford and Wirksworth, into an area called the Dovegang. When it was completed in 1652 there was an immediate jump in ore production in the area. Vermuyden's was followed by a succession of soughs which by the end of the century had drained enough of the mines in the Wirksworth Wapentake to cause a dramatic rise in production in the whole area. The most important were the Cromford Sough, which was over thirty years in driving, between 1662 and 1696, and was continued in the 18th century, and Hannage Sough, begun in 1693 and also continued into the next century. The Cromford Sough provided the power for Richard Arkwright's mills at Cromford, the first of which was built in 1771. Also among the important 17th century soughs were the Raventor, begun in 1655, Bates (1657–84), Lees (1664), and Baileycroft (1667–73). The Baileycroft Sough drained mines in Wirksworth. Those in the area just to the north of Wirksworth called the Gulf were drained by the Raventor and Lees Soughs. The Bates and Cromford Soughs drained mines on Cromford Moor – Bates Sough had reached the Dovegang by 1684. Hannage Sough drained the area to the east of Yokecliffe Rake, on the south of Wirksworth.

Drainage of the mines in the whole of the Wirksworth area was eventually accomplished by the Meerbrook Sough, begun at the level of the river Derwent in 1772, at a time when lead-mining ventures had become only intermittently profitable. The entrance to this sough is 10 feet (3.0 metres) wide and 8 feet (2.4 metres) high and has a keystone inscribed "FH 1772". FH was Francis Hurt of Alderwasley, smelter, lead mine shareholder, iron-master and the main shareholder in the sough. It still discharges 12 million imperial gallons (55,000 m^{3}) to 20 million imperial gallons (91,000 m^{3}) a day, and by the 1830s had so reduced the flow from the Cromford Sough that in 1846 Richard Arkwright's successor had to end production at the Cromford mills. In other areas the Mill Close mines between Winster and Wensley, and the mines of Youlgreave were soughed.

== Cupola smelting ==
The mills which had superseded the ancient bolehills in the late 16th century, a development described above, were themselves superseded in the 18th century by the gradual introduction of a new type of furnace known as the cupola.

The old mills had a number of disadvantages. Their characteristic overheating and dissemination of polluting fumes made it necessary to close the smelter down at the end of each day's work. The hearth burned out quickly and regular weekly repairs or rebuilding were necessary – between 24 June and 29 September 1657, for instance, thirteen new hearths were required at the Upper Mill in Wirksworth. Water-powered smelting mills were restricted to riverside sites and "white coal" fuel required a good supply of timber. By the 18th century timber supplies were running out and, where coke or coal was used because of timber shortages, impurities, particularly sulphur, were introduced into the lead. It was, finally, less efficient than the cupola.

The cupola was a reverberatory furnace. The fuel was burned in a combustion chamber at the side of the furnace, separate from the "charge" of ore, thus avoiding any contamination. This removed the disadvantage in using coal, which was far more plentiful than timber. The ore was loaded from a hopper into a concave furnace with a low, arched roof and a tall chimney or a flue at the opposite end from the combustion chamber. The flames and heated gases from the fuel were drawn across the charge by the draught from the chimney and beaten down by reverberation from the low roof. Slag on the surface of the molten lead was raked off and the lead itself poured into an iron pot at the side, before being ladled into moulds.

Several factors contributed to the cupola's greater efficiency than the smelting mill. Unlike the smelting mill, the cupola could be operated continuously. Since the air flow over the ore was less powerful than that from the bellows of the blast furnace fewer lead particles were blown away. Further lead was saved by the fact that since the fuel and the charge were separate none of the lead was lost into the ash. Since no water power was needed the cupola had a fourth theoretical advantage of being freed from the riverside location of the blast furnace, and able to be placed in the most convenient site for supply of ore and coal. However, the higher temperatures needed to melt the slag recovered from the primary melt required a water-powered furnace and, since slag mills tended to be placed next to the cupolas, most cupolas remained in riverside sites.

Many cupolas had long horizontal flues, which were introduced to trap pollutants before they could be discharged into the air. Since the pollutants included metal vapour, the sweepings of the flue could also be recovered for resmelting.

== Closure ==
The Derbyshire lead industry declined after the late 18th century because of worked-out veins, increased production costs and the discovery of much cheaper foreign sources. The industry was protected from this foreign ore by import duty in the late 18th and early 19th centuries. A reduction in the duty in 1820 and its abolition in 1845 brought a steep rise in the volume of lead imported into England and accelerated the local industry's decline.

There were still bursts of high production, and indeed the output of certain mines during the 18th and 19th centuries exceeded anything achieved in the 17th century; over 2658 loads (about 641 tons or 651 metric tonnes) were mined at Brassington, traditionally an area of low output, in 1862. At a meeting of the Barmote Court in Wirksworth in 1862 one mine owner announced "that by perseverance for upwards of twenty years, they had at last found the long sought for treasure, which he hoped would be prosperous, and they should be able to continue employing, as they are at the present time, upwards of 100 men at one mine in Brassington". However, by 1901 the number of men employed in all the Derbyshire lead mines had fallen to 285 most of whom worked at the Mill Close Mine at Darley Bridge. Mill Close, the biggest lead mine in the country, took the Derbyshire lead industry into the 20th century, and just before its enforced closure in 1939, caused by flooding, employed about 600 men. The smelter at Mill Close, established in 1934, was bought in 1941 by H J Enthoven and Sons, a London-based lead producer, and still operates.

== See also ==
- Beans and Bacon mine
- Lathkill Dale (lead mining)
- Lutudarum
- Magpie Mine
- Odin Mine
- Peak District Mining Museum
- Killhope Wheel, Lead Mining Museum, Co. Durham.
- Mining in Roman Britain
- Metal mining in Wales
