= Moot Hall, Wirksworth =

Judicial building in Derbyshire, England

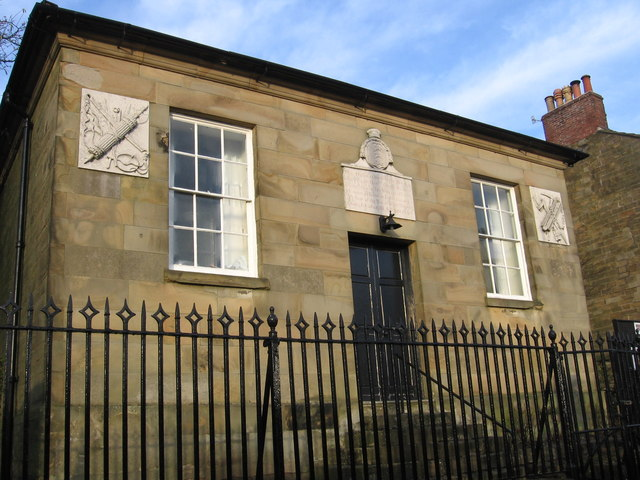
- Moot Hall, Wirksworth

- Shown in Derbyshire
- 53.0841°N 1.5720°W
- Location: Chapel Lane, Wirksworth, Derbyshire

History
- Built: 1814

Site notes
- Architectural style: Neoclassical style

Listed Building – Grade II
- Official name: Moot Hall
- Designated: 23 January 1973
- Reference no.: 1109611

The Moot Hall is a judicial building in Chapel Lane in Wirksworth, Derbyshire, England. The building, which is used as the meeting place of the barmote court, a body formed to regulate the local lead mining industry, is a Grade II listed building.

== History ==
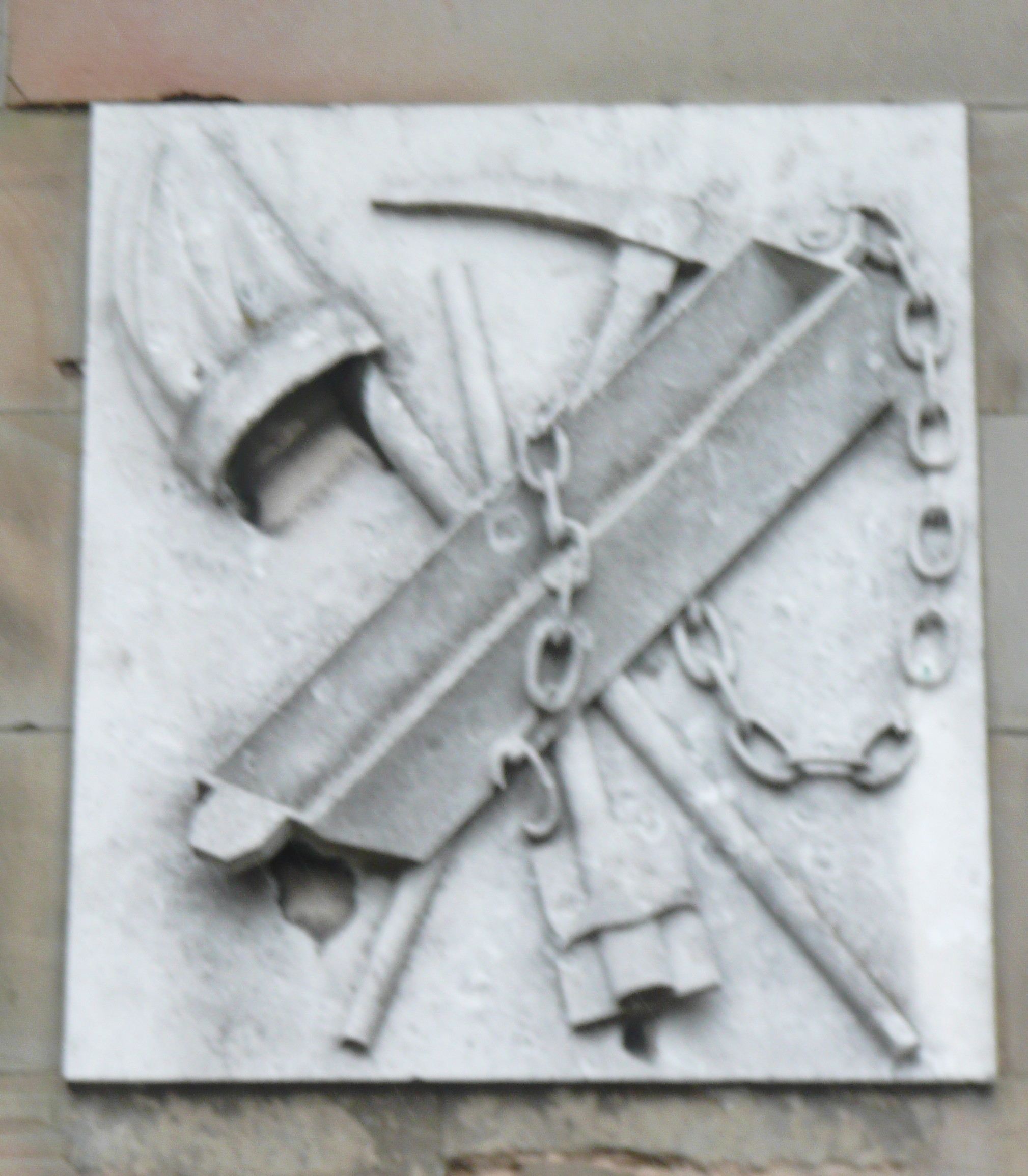
Plaque on the Moot Hall, depicting lead mining tools

A barmote court was established in the town in order to regulate the local lead mining industry in 1288 during the reign of Edward I. The first permanent building erected to accommodate the barmote court was a moot hall in the Market Place which was commissioned by the Chancellor of the Duchy of Lancaster, Thomas Villiers, 1st Earl of Clarendon, in 1773. After the first moot hall became dilapidated, a later Chancellor of the Duchy of Lancaster, Charles Bathurst, decided to commission a new moot hall in Chapel Lane.

The new building was designed in the neoclassical style, built in ashlar stone and was completed in 1814. The design involved an asymmetrical main frontage of three bays facing onto Chapel Lane. The central bay, which was approached by a short flight of steps, contained a double-leaf wooden doorway. Above the doorway was a stone panel, which was surmounted by a coat of arms and engraved with the words: "This hall was built by the direction of the Right Honourable Charles Bathurst, Chancellor of His Majesty's Duchy County Palatine of Lancaster in the 54th year of the resign of His Majesty George III AD MDCCCXIV". The outer bays were fenestrated by sash windows, beyond which there were Hopton Wood Stone panels, depicting various lead mining tools including a scales, a pickaxe and a trough. These panels had been recovered from the earlier moot hall. Internally, the principal room was the barmote courtroom.

The barmote court consisted on a chief barmaster, the deputy barmasters and 24 jurors: they met twice a year in the moot hall to determine the allocation of mines and sought to resolve any disputes. King Henry VIII presented a bronze dish, capable of holding 38.5 kilograms (85 lb) of lead ore, to the barmote court in 1512. It was kept in the moot hall and was used by barmote court officials to ensure that the miners' dishes conformed to the required dimensions. The barmote court also acted as a coroner's court, investigating mining accidents, and also acted as a criminal court: the penalty for stealing from a mine was to have a hand nailed to the stowce (winch), giving a miscreant the choice of tearing himself loose or starving to death. The building remains in the ownership of the Duchy of Lancaster, which is a private estate of the British sovereign.

== See also ==
- Listed buildings in Wirksworth
