= Listed buildings in Litton, Derbyshire =

Litton is a civil parish in the Derbyshire Dales district of Derbyshire, England. The parish contains 27 listed buildings that are recorded in the National Heritage List for England. Of these, one is listed at Grade II*, the middle of the three grades, and the others are at Grade II, the lowest grade. The parish contains the villages of Litton and Cressbrook and the surrounding area. The listed buildings in Litton are grouped around the village green, and include houses, cottages, farmhouses and a barn, a public house, a school, and a village cross. The listed buildings in Cressbrook are mainly associated with the former cotton mill, Cressbrook Mill, which is listed, together with Cressbrook Hall and its lodges, which were built for the owner, workers' cottages, a former apprentices' house, a war memorial, and a telephone kiosk. Between the villages, in an otherwise isolated position, are two terraces of workers' cottages.

== Key ==
Grade	Criteria
II*	Particularly important buildings of more than special interest
II	Buildings of national importance and special interest

== Buildings ==
Name and location	Photograph	Date	Notes	Grade
Clergy House, gate piers and wall 53.27338°N 1.75541°W		1723	The house is in limestone with gritstone dressings, quoins, and a stone slate roof with coped gables and moulded kneelers. There are two storeys and six bays. The doorway has a moulded architrave and a projecting pediment on brackets, and above it is a decorated initialled and dated plaque. The windows are mullioned with two lights. Enclosing the front garden is a wall about 6 feet (1.8 m) high with quoins and flat copings, containing square gritstone gate piers with plain entablatures.	II
Scarsdale House Farmhouse and barn 53.27319°N 1.75407°W		1723	The farmhouse and barn to the right under a continuous roof are in limestone, the house rendered, with gritstone dressings and a Welsh slate roof with coped gables, plain and moulded kneelers, and a ball finial. The house has two storeys and three bays. The central doorway has a moulded surround, a dated and initialled lintel, and a bracketed hood, and the windows are casements. In front of the house is a dry stone garden wall with rounded copings. The barn contains various openings, including a cart entrance and partly blocked doorways with segmental heads, and in the upper floor are three openings with segmental heads.	II
Clergy Cottage; 53.27345°N 1.75535°W		Early 18th century	The cottage is in limestone with gritstone dressings and a stone slate roof. There are two storeys and three bays. In the centre is a doorway, to the left is a lean-to porch at right angles, and the windows are mullioned.	II
Holly Cottage; 53.27355°N 1.75532°W	—	Early 18th century	A limestone house with gritstone dressings, and a stone slate roof with coped gables and moulded kneelers. There are two storeys and two bays. The doorway has stone surround and a bracketed lintel, and the windows are casements.	II
Hammerton Hall Farmhouse; 53.27296°N 1.75592°W		1768	The farmhouse is in limestone with gritstone dressings, quoins, a moulded eaves band, and a stone slate roof with coped gables and moulded kneelers. There are two storeys, three bays, and a later extension to the east. The central doorway has a moulded surround and a bracketed segmental pediment, and above it is a round-headed window with impost blocks and a keystone. The other windows are mullioned with three lights, and there are two dated cast iron rainwater heads.	II
Red Lion Cottage and Alstonfield Cottage; 53.27354°N 1.75618°W		Late 18th century	A pair of cottages in rendered limestone with gritstone dressings and a Welsh slate roof. There are two storeys and four bays. Each cottage has a doorway with a plain surround and a bracketed hood, and the windows are 20th-century small-pane casements.	II
Red Lion Inn; 53.27360°N 1.75632°W		Late 18th century	The public house is in limestone with gritstone dressings and a Welsh slate roof. There are two storeys and three bays. The doorway has a moulded surround and a bracketed hood, and the windows are sashes.	II
Tallon Green; 53.27365°N 1.75647°W	—	Late 18th century	A pair of cottages combined into one house, it is in limestone with gritstone dressings, quoins, and a Welsh slate roof with one moulded kneeler. There are two storeys and two bays. In the centre, the doors have been combined into one and are flanked by sidelights. The other windows are mullioned with three lights.	II
Cressbrook Mill; 53.25110°N 1.74206°W		1814–15	A cotton mill that closed in 1965, and was converted into flats from 2000. It is in limestone, partly rendered, with gritstone dressings, quoins, and a hipped Welsh slate roof surmounted by an octagonal wooden cupola with an ogee lead roof. There are three storeys and basements, and a symmetrical north front of twelve bays, with two additional bays to the left, the middle four bays projecting under a pediment containing a clock face. A projecting bay to the west contains a spiral staircase, and to the northwest is a wheelpit.	II*
Dale View Terrace; 53.25157°N 1.74234°W		1817	Originally an apprentices' house for Cressbrook Mill, later a terrace of houses, it is in limestone, partly rendered, with a Welsh slate roof, and is in three parts. The left part is a square embattled tower with four tiers of lancet windows. In the centre is a doorway with a pointed arch, over which are two lancet windows with Y-tracery, and an embattled parapet. Recessed above this are more lancet windows and a stepped gable. ON the right is a square tower. The north front has six bays, and contains sash windows.	II
71-76 Ravensdale Cottages; 53.25977°N 1.74354°W		1823	A terrace of six cottages, in two steps on a slope. They are in limestone with gritstone dressings and stone slate roofs. There are two storeys and six bays. Each bay contains a doorway with a flush surround, to its left is a two-light mullioned window, and in the upper floor is a single-light window. All the openings have hood moulds, and the windows contain Gothic glazing bars.	II
81–86 Ravensdale Cottages; 53.25990°N 1.74355°W		1823	A terrace of six cottages, in two steps on a slope. They are in limestone with gritstone dressings and stone slate roofs. There are two storeys and six bays. Each bay contains a doorway with a flush surround, to its right is a two-light mullioned window, and in the upper floor is a single-light window. All the openings have hood moulds, and the windows contain Gothic glazing bars.	II
59–62 Top Cottages; 53.25497°N 1.74808°W	—	c. 1843	A terrace of four workers' cottages in limestone with gritstone dressings, quoins, and a Welsh slate roof. There is a single storey and attics, and four bays. In the ground floor of each cottage is a doorway with a bracketed hood, and a three-light mullioned window. Above is a two-light gabled dormer with bargeboards and a finial.	II
63–65 Top Cottages; 53.25499°N 1.74768°W	—	c. 1843	A terrace of three workers' cottages in limestone with gritstone dressings, quoins, and Welsh slate roofs with bargeboards and finials. There are two storeys and three gabled bays, the middle bay projecting and taller. Some windows have a single light, some are mullioned, and others are 20th-century replacements; some windows have hood moulds.	II
66–69 Top Cottages; 53.25500°N 1.74734°W	—	c. 1843	A terrace of four workers' cottages in limestone with gritstone dressings, quoins, and a Welsh slate roof. There is a single storey and attics, and four bays. In the ground floor of each cottage is a doorway with a bracketed hood, and a three-light mullioned window. Above is a two-light gabled dormer with bargeboards and a finial.	II
Cressbrook Hall and terracing 53.25344°N 1.74677°W		1843	A small country house, it was designed by Weightman and Hadfield in Tudor style, and was extended in 1851. It is in limestone and gritstone, and has Welsh slate roofs with moulded coped gables and moulded finials. There are two storeys and an irregular L-shaped plan, and most of the windows are mullioned. The north front has ten bays, and contains a doorway with a moulded surround and a four-centred arch, above which is a mullioned and transomed oriel window. The south front contains an arcade of three four-centred arches with a gableted parapet, a stair window, and two-storey canted embattled bay windows. Attached to the south and east of the house is balustraded terracing and a sundial.	II
Lower Lodge, gates and wall 53.25335°N 1.74378°W		1843 (probable)	The lodge to Cressbrook Hall, designed by Weightman and Hadfield in Tudor style, is in limestone with gritstone dressings, vermiculated quoins, and a Welsh slate roof with coped gables, moulded kneelers, and finials. There is a single storey and an attic. To the northwest is a gabled bay containing a large mullioned window, with a stepped hood mould, and a slit vent above. To its left is a gabled porch, over which is a gabled dormer. The garden is enclosed by a low wall with chamfered copings and octagonal piers, and on the wall is a rustic wooden fence.	II
Top Lodge and wall 53.25416°N 1.74577°W		1843	The lodge to Cressbrook Hall, designed by Weightman and Hadfield in Tudor style, is in limestone with gritstone dressings, vermiculated quoins, and a Welsh slate roof with coped gables, moulded kneelers, and finials. There is a single storey and an attic. To the northwest is a gabled bay containing a canted bay window, over which is a two-light mullioned window. To the northeast is an outshut and a similar window, and on this side is a curving garden wall surmounted by a rustic-style timber fence.	II
40–43 Middle Row; 53.25482°N 1.74587°W		c. 1845	A terrace of four workers' cottages in limestone with gritstone dressings, vermiculated quoins, and Welsh slate roofs with bargeboards and finials. There are two storeys and six bays with two gables. The windows either have a single light, or are mullioned with two or three lights.	II
44 and 45 Middle Row; 53.25473°N 1.74616°W	—	c. 1845	A pair of workers' cottages in limestone with gritstone dressings, vermiculated quoins, and Welsh slate roofs with bargeboards and finials. There are two storeys and attics, and two gabled bays. The windows either have a single light, or are mullioned with two or three lights.	II
46–49 Middle Row; 53.25470°N 1.74649°W	—	c. 1845	A terrace of four workers' cottages in limestone with gritstone dressings, vermiculated quoins, and Welsh slate roofs with bargeboards and finials. There are two storeys and six bays with two gables. The windows either have a single light, or are mullioned with two or three lights.	II
Cressbrook Cottage and Daleways; 53.25513°N 1.74535°W	—	c. 1845	A cottage and warehouse, later a pair of cottages, in limestone with gritstone dressings, vermiculated quoins, and Welsh slate roofs with bargeboards and finials. There are two storeys and attics, and a front of three bays, the right bay projecting and gabled. The right bay contains a doorway with a four-centred arch, mullioned windows above, and a single-light window in the attic. The left bay contains a doorway with a gabled porch on brackets, above is a modern window, and in the middle bay are mullioned windows. Most of the windows have hood moulds.	II
Grove House, walls and railings 53.27356°N 1.75560°W		Mid 19th century	A house in limestone with gritstone dressings, quoins, a chamfered string course, and a stone slate roof with coped gables and moulded kneelers. There are two storeys and three bays. The central doorway has a chamfered surround, a four-centred arch, and a bracketed hood with an embattled motif. The windows are mullioned with three lights, and above the doorway is a decorative diamond-shaped motif with a quatrefoil. Attached to the front is a low coped garden wall with iron railings.	II
Village cross 53.27325°N 1.75650°W		19th century	The cross on the village green is in gritstone. It consists of an older base of four square steps, on which is an obelisk dating from the 19th century.	II
Litton School; 53.27346°N 1.75587°W		1869	The school is in limestone with gritstone dressings, on a chamfered plinth, and has a stone slate roof with coped gables and moulded kneelers. There is a single storey at the front, and two storeys at the rear and, facing the road, are two gabled bays. The right bay has a doorway with a moulded surround and a four-centred arch, and a hood mould extending over a single-light window on each side. Above is a five-light window with a four-centred arched head, a clock face, and a gabled bellcote. In the left bay is a five-light mullioned window, over which is a niche containing a statue.	II
War memorial 53.25479°N 1.74693°W	—	c. 1920	The war memorial is in an enclosure built into a hillside. It is in limestone with gritstone dressings, and consists of a tapering pier on a pedestal base. On the pedestal is a carved wreath containing dates, and an inscription, and on the base and sides are the names of those lost in the First World War. The enclosure has retaining walls with obelisks at the entry, and railings elsewhere.	II
Telephone kiosk 53.25471°N 1.74689°W	—	1935	The K6 type telephone kiosk in Cressbrook was designed by Giles Gilbert Scott. Constructed in cast iron with a square plan and a dome, it has three unperforated crowns in the top panels.	II
