= Warden's court =

Special court established to handle mining industry disputes

A warden's court is a special court established to deal with disputes relating to mining and mineral tenements. It is presided over by a mining warden. Historically all Australian states had warden's courts, which were established in the late 19th century during the Australian gold rushes. However, in several states the position of mining warden has been abolished or had its powers reduced.

== New South Wales ==
The warden's courts of New South Wales were courts established to deal with issues and disputes concerning mining claims under the Mining Act 1992 (NSW). Matters are now heard before the Land and Environment Court of New South Wales.

=== History ===
Mining has had a long history in the state, dating to the late 1800s. In 1874, the colonial government provided for the establishment of wardens courts to regulate and adjudicate upon various matters and disputes that commonly occur concerning mining. The Governor of New South Wales could also appoint mining wardens. Generally, these were local justices of the peace or sergeants of police. Those courts have continued to the present day, via the Land and Environment Court.

=== Composition ===
The Governor could have appointed a chief warden, usually called the chief mining warden. The governor could also have appointed other wardens, usually called mining wardens. A warden or chief warden must be magistrates of the Local Court of New South Wales. When sitting, wardens sit alone without a jury.

=== Jurisdiction ===
The Wardens Court could have determined disputes between miners, such as boundaries of claims, disputes between landowners and miners, or claims for compensation.

The Minister for Mineral Resources may direct an inquiry into any matter arising under the various mining laws. At the conclusion of the inquiry, the warden was required to prepare a written report for the Minister with any recommendations made.

In some case, the court acted as an appellate court to review determinations made by mining arbitrators. Generally the decision of the court is final and there are no further appeals allowed. The court could also review decisions of the mining registrars, such as where a mineral claim has been cancelled.

== Queensland ==
Warden's courts existed in Queensland from 1874 to 2001. They were originally established under the Gold Fields Act 1874 and restricted to goldfields; other minerals had similar courts presided over by "mineral lands commissioners". The Mining Act 1898 merged the two offices under the title mining warden. The warden's courts had "jurisdiction to hear and determine all actions, suits and proceedings relating to prospecting, exploration or mining or to any permit, claim, licence or lease granted under any Act relating to mining". Decisions could be appealed to the Supreme Court of Queensland. The warden's courts also had similar duties to coroners in relation to deaths occurring on minesites.

The Mineral Resources Act 1989 established a centralised Mining Wardens Court as a court of record, with regional offices under the supervision of mining registrars. However, the Land and Resources Tribunal Act 1999 abolished the Mining Wardens Court with effect from 2001 and transferred its jurisdiction to the Land and Resources Tribunal.

== Western Australia ==
In Western Australia, the Warden's Court is constituted under the Mining Act 1978 and has jurisdiction throughout the state. Any person holding office as a stipendiary magistrate may be appointed as a mining warden and preside over a court sitting.

== See also ==
- Barmote court
- Stannary court
