= List of emblems of Derbyshire =

This is a list of emblems that are used in the English county of Derbyshire and its county town of Derby.

== Flags ==
Flag	Date	Use	Description
	Adopted on 16 September 2008. Launched on 22 September 2006. Designed by Martin Enright.	Flown widely at locations including Derby Cathedral.	Blue is a traditional colour of Derbyshire, representing its rivers and reservoirs. The green cross indicates both the county's rural countryside and its central location in England. The gold Tudor rose signifies the quality of Derbyshire's people.
		Flag of the Diocese of Derby	Cross of St. George with the heraldic shield of the Diocese of Derby, showing three fountains above a cross potent.

== Coats of arms ==
Arms	Date	Use	Description
	Granted on 17 September 1937. Adopted in 1938. The crest and supporters were granted in 1975.	Derbyshire County Council	Heraldry: A Tudor rose below three stags' heads. A dragon with a pick on the crest. A stag and a ram support the shield. The motto 'BENE CONSULENDO' means by wise deliberation.
	Granted in 1378. Regranted on 12 May 1939 together with the crest and supporters.	Derby City Council	Heraldry: A buck within a park fence on the shield. A Derby ram on the crest. Two bucks support the shield. The motto 'INDUSTRIA VIRTUS ET FORTITUDO' means diligence, courage and strength.
	Granted on 21 December 1995.	University of Derby	Heraldry: An armillary sphere (representing science) below two stags' heads and a cross potent. An owl with a Tudor rose at its neck on the crest. A stag and a griffin support the shield.
	Since c.1435	Earl of Derby	Arms of House of Stanley (Earls of Derby c.1435-present). Heraldry: Argent background with three bucks' heads on a bend azure.

== Logos ==
Logo	Date	Use	Description
Logo on offices in Buxton	1975. Designed by Kenneth Hollick.	Derbyshire County Council's publications and digital media	The logo is used to support the Council's aim of "providing accountable, efficient and customer-focused services to the people of Derbyshire".
		Derby City Council	The logo is a stylised image of a ram and a buck.
	1967	Derbyshire Police	The County's Tudor rose and stags' heads with the Derby ram. The motto ‘VIS UNITA FORTIOR’ means strength united is greater.
Logo on pavilion		Derbyshire County Cricket Club	A golden Tudor rose and St Edward’s crown.
Logo on Pride Park Stadium	1971	Derby County F.C.	A stylised white Derby ram.

== See also ==
- Armorial of the United Kingdom
- List of flags of the United Kingdom
- History of Derbyshire
