= Litton, Derbyshire =

Village in Derbyshire, England

Coordinates: 53.274°N 1.756°W

Litton
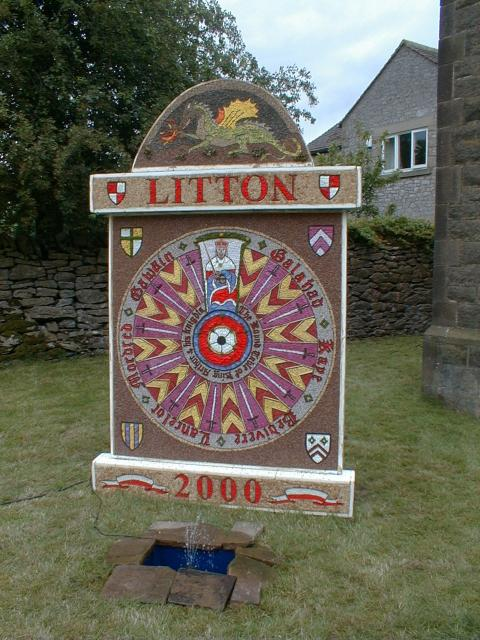
- Well dressing, June 2000

- Location within Derbyshire
- Population: 675 (2011)
- OS grid reference: SK163752
- District: Derbyshire Dales
- Shire county: Derbyshire
- Region: East Midlands
- Country: England
- Sovereign state: United Kingdom
- Post town: BUXTON
- Postcode district: SK17
- Police: Derbyshire
- Fire: Derbyshire
- Ambulance: East Midlands
- UK Parliament: High Peak

Litton is a village and civil parish in the Peak District of Derbyshire, England. The population at the 2011 Census was 675 (including Cressbrook (within the parish) and the separate parish of Little Longstone). It is one mile from Tideswell and six miles from Bakewell.

The village has a primary school, a public house (the Red Lion) and a post office run by a co-operative of villagers. There are two churches, one at the east end of the village, and Christ Church at the west, on the outskirts of the village on the road to Tideswell.

Litton has a well dressing each summer. The display is set on a base of moist clay and the patterns formed from petals, seeds, mosses and lichens.

== History ==
When it was first classed as a village in the late 18th century there were only a few houses on the outskirts of Tideswell. Later on, however, a lead mine was built near Peter's Rock. An obelisk-style cross shaft lies atop steps on the village green.

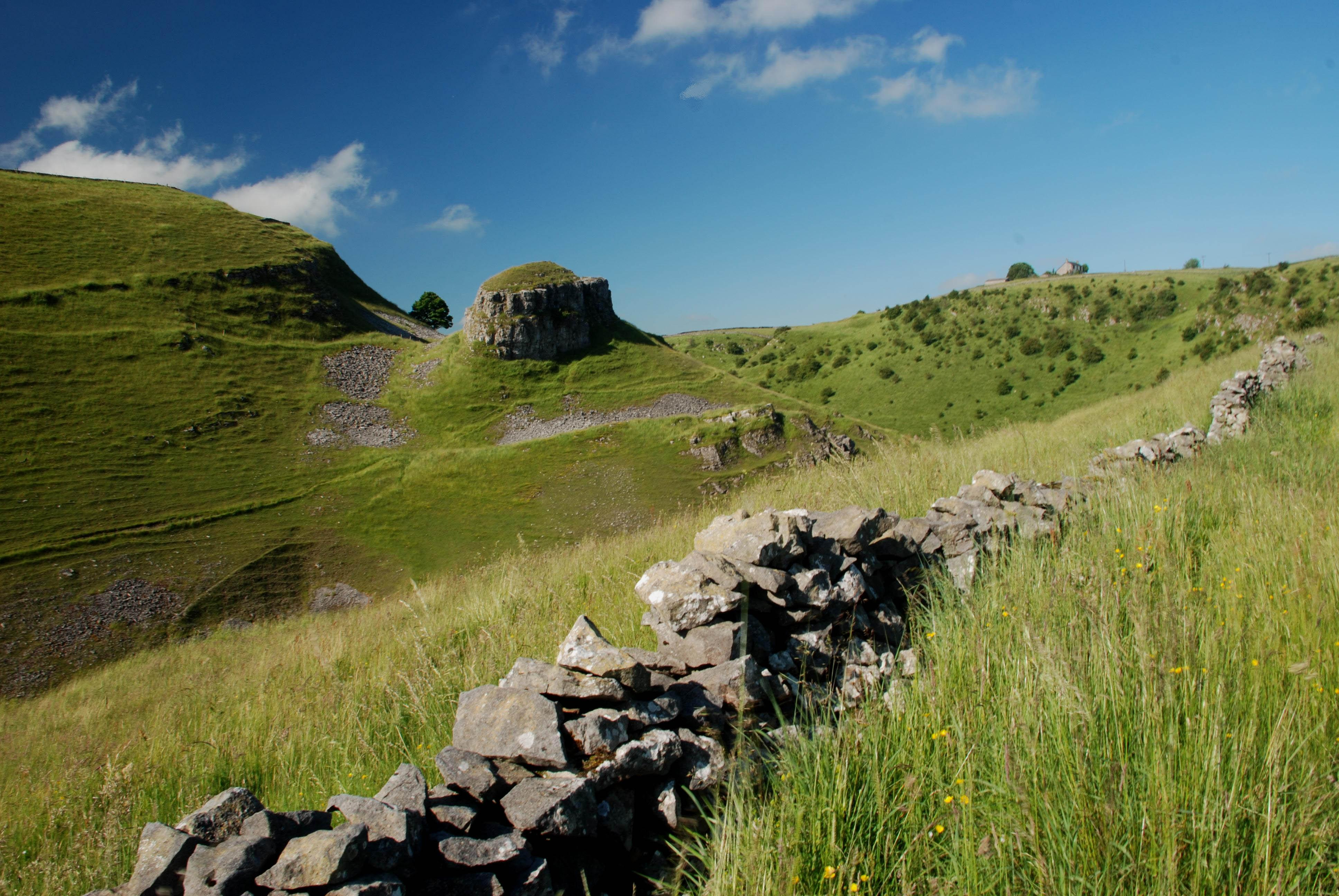
Nearby Peter's Stone

== Notable residents ==
This was the birthplace in 1628 of William Bagshaw, the celebrated Nonconformist divine called the "Apostle of the Peak".

== See also ==
- Listed buildings in Litton, Derbyshire
