= Hundreds of Derbyshire =

Historic divisions of the county of Derbyshire in England

The Hundreds of Derbyshire were the geographic divisions of the historic county of Derbyshire for administrative, military and judicial purposes. They were established in Derbyshire some time before the Norman Conquest. In the Domesday Survey of 1086 AD the hundreds were called wapentakes. By 1273 the county was divided into 8 hundreds with some later combined, becoming 6 hundreds over the following centuries. The Local Government Act 1894 replaced hundreds with districts. Derbyshire is now divided into 8 administrative boroughs within the Derbyshire County Council area.

== Domesday Book wapentakes ==
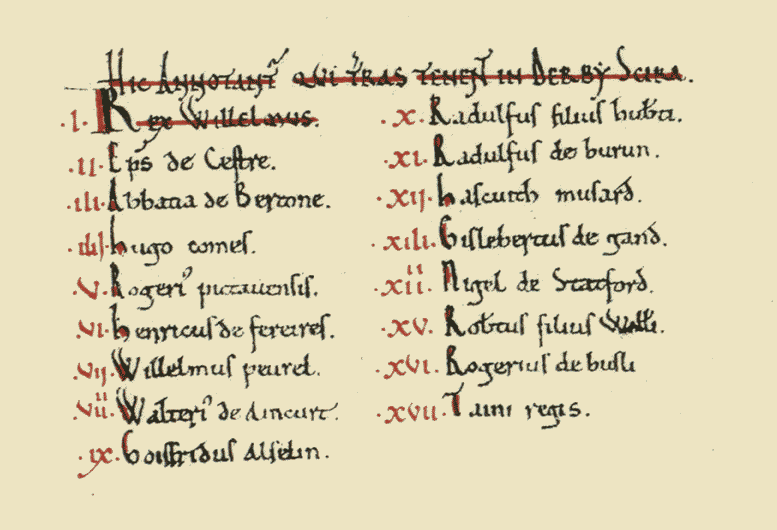
Derbyshire Domesday Book tenants-in-chief HIC ANNOTANTUR TENENTES TERRAS IN DERBYSCIRE "Here are noted (those) holding lands in Derbyshire"

In the Domesday Book, Derbyscire (Derbyshire) was divided into the 6 wapentakes of Apultre, Hamestan, Littlechirch, Morlestan, Scarvedale, and Walecross, and a district called Peche-fers (Peak Forest). 16 named tenants-in-chief and King's thanes were granted lands in the county. King William the Conqueror was tenant-in-chief for 130 lands including Ashbourne, Bakewell, Chesterfield, Derby and Matlock. Henry de Ferrers was the tenant-in-chief for 110 lands. William Peverel held 18 lands including Bolsover and Castleton.

=== Apultre ===
45 places are named under the wapentake: Alkmonton, Ashe, Aston, Barton [Blount], Bentley, Boylestone, Bradley, Brailsford, Bupton, [Church] Broughton, Clifton, Doveridge, Eaton [Dovedale], Edlaston, Ednaston, Fenton, Foston, Great and Little Cubley, Hatton, Hilton, Hollington, Hoon, Hulland, Mapperley, Marston [-on-Dove], Marston [Montgomery]?, Norbury, Osleston, Osmaston, Rodsley, Roston, Sapperton, Scropton, Sedsall, Shirley, Snelston, Somersal, Sturston [Hall] and [Nether] Sturston, Sudbury, Sutton [-on-the-Hill], Thurvaston, Trusley?, Wyaston, Yeaveley, Yeldersley.

=== Hamestan ===
45 places are named under the wapentake: Alsop [-en-le-Dale], Ashbourne, Atlow, Ballidon, Bonsall, Bradbourne, Brassington, Broadlowash, Callow, Carsington, [Cold] Eaton, Cowley, Cromford, Elton, [Fenny] Bentley, Hanson [Grange], Hartington, Hognaston, Hopton, Ible, Ivonbrook [Grange], [Kirk] Ireton, Kniveton, Lea, Ludwell, Mapleton, Matlock, Matlock [Bridge]?, Middleton, Newton [Grange], Offcote, Parwich, Pilsbury, Shottle, Snitterton, Soham, Tansley, Thorpe, Tissington, Wallstone, Welledene, Wensley, Werredune, Winster, Wirksworth.

71 other places are also named within the manor of Blackwell: Abney, Ashford [-in-the-Water], Aston, Bakewell, Bamford, Baslow, Beeley, Birchills, Birchover, Blackwell, Bradwell, Bubnell, Burley, Burton, Calver, Castleton, Charlesworth, Chatsworth, Chisworth and [Higher] Chisworth, Chunal, Conksbury, Cotes, Darley, Edale, Edensor, Eyam, Farley, Flagg, Gratton, [Great and Little] Hucklow, [Great] Longstone, Hadfield, Harthill, Hassop, Hathersage, Hayfield?, Hazelbadge, [Higher and Lower] Dinting, Holme, Hope, Kinder, Langley, [Little?] Longstone, Litton, Longdendale, Ludworth, Middleton, Monyash, Muchedeswelle, [Nether and Over] Haddon, [Nether and Upper] Hurst, Offerton, Old Glossop, One Ash, Padfield and [Little] Padfield, Pilsley, Priestcliffe, Rowland, Rowsley, Shatton, Sheldon, Stanton [-in-Peak], [Stoney] Middleton, Stoke, Taddington, Thornsett, Tideswell, Watrefeld, Whitfield, Wormhill, Youlgrave.

=== Littlechirch ===
40 places are named under the Litchurch wapentake: Allestree, Alvaston, Ambaston, Arleston, Aston [-on-Trent], Barrow [-upon-Trent], Bearwardcote, Boulton, Burnaston, Chellaston, Cottons, Dalbury, Egginton, Elvaston, Etwall, Findern, Ireton, Kedleston, [Kirk] Langley, Litchurch, Littleover, Mackworth, Marsh?, Mercaston, Mickleover, Mugginton, Normanton, Osmaston, Potlocks, Quarndon, Radbourne, Shardlow, Sinfin, Stenson, Swarkestone, Thulston, Twyford, Weston [-on-Trent], Weston [Underwood], Willington.

=== Morlestan ===
42 places are named under the wapentake: Bradley, Breadsall, Breaston, Cellesdene, Chaddesden, Codnor, Crich, Denby, Derby, Draycott, Duffield, Hallam, Heanor, Herdebi, Holbrook, Hopwell, Horsley, Ilkeston, Kidsleypark, Langley, [Little?] Hallam, [Little] Chester, [Little] Eaton, [Long] Eaton, Makeney, Markeaton, Milford, Morley, Ockbrook, Pentrich, Ripley, Risley, Sandiacre, Sawley, Shipley, Shuckstone, Smalley, Smithycote, Spondon, Stanley, Stanton [-by-Dale], Vlvritune.

=== Scarsdale ===
71 places are named under the wapentake: Alfreton, Ashover, Barlborough, Barlow, Beighton, Blingsby, Bolsover, Boythorpe, Bramley [Vale], Brimington, Calow, Chesterfield, Clowne, [Coal] Aston, Dore, Dronfield, Duckmanton and [Long] Duckmanton, Eckington, Egstow, Elmton, Esnotrewic, Glapwell, [Great] Barlow, Greyhirst, Handley, Hardstoft, Holme, Holmesfield, Killamarsh, Lowne, [Middle, Nether and West] Handley, Morton, Morton, Mosborough, [Nether and Upper] Pilsley, Newbold and [Upper] Newbold, Newton, [North?] Wingfield, Norton and [Little] Norton, Ogston, [Old] Brampton, [Old] Tupton, [Old] Whittington, Owlcotes?, Padinc, Palterton, Rauenesholm, Rowthorne, Scarcliffe, Shirland, [South?] Wingfield, [South] Normanton, [Stony] Houghton, Stainsby, Staveley, Stretton, Sutton [Scarsdale], Tapton, [Temple] Normanton, Tibshelf, Totley, Tunstall, Ufton, Unstone, Upton, Wadshelf, Walton, Wessington, Whitwell, Williamthorpe, Wingerworth.

=== Walecross ===
24 places are named under the wapentake: Appleby [Magna], Bolun, Bretby, Caldwell, Catton, Coton [-in-the-Elms], Drakelowe, Foremark, Hartshorne, Hearthcote, Ingleby, Lullington, Melbourne, Milton, Newton [Solney], Repton, Rosliston, Smisby, Stanton, Stanton [-by-Bridge], Stretton [-en-le-Field], Swadlincote, Ticknall, Walton [-on-Trent].

== Medieval hundreds ==
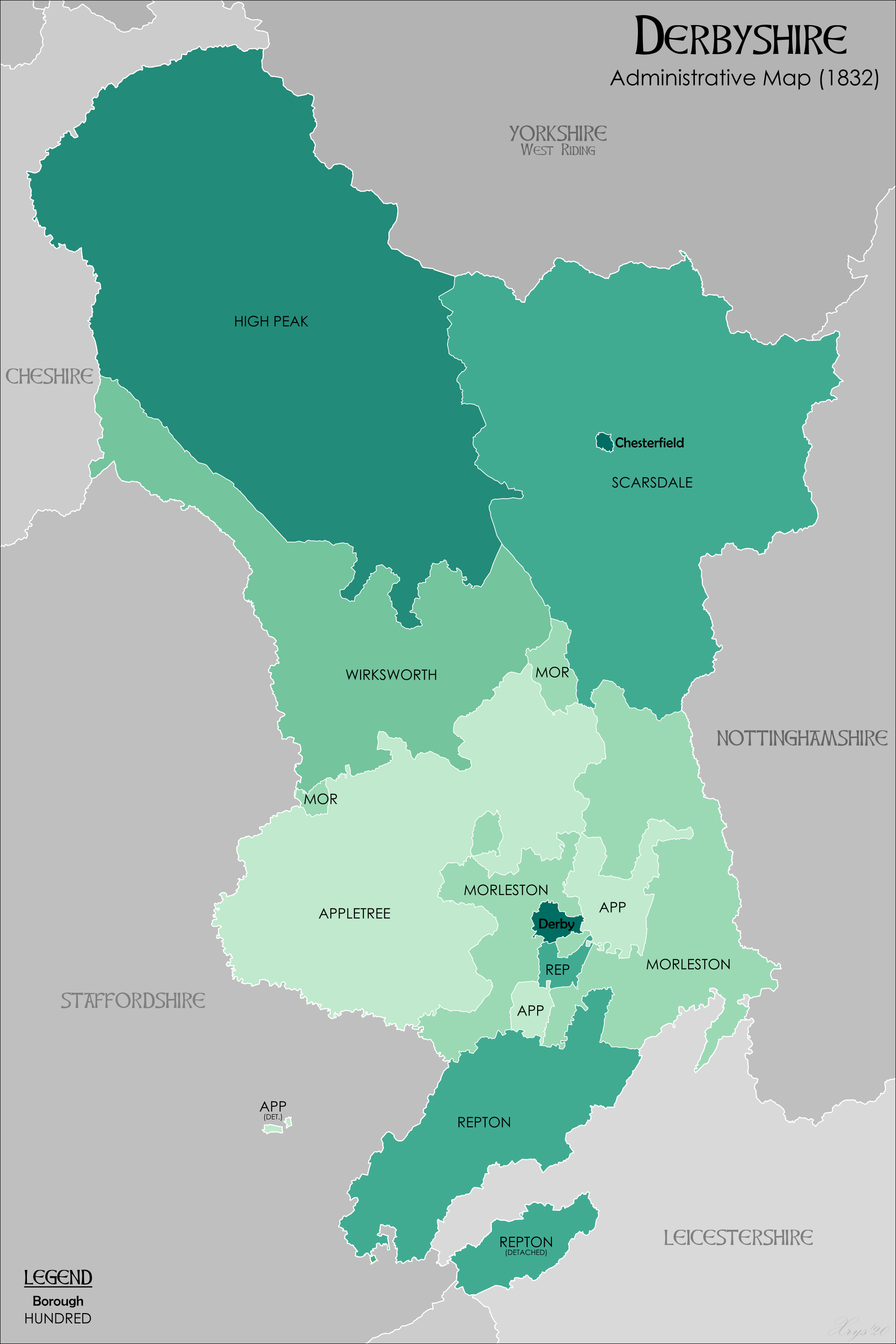
Derbyshire hundreds in 1832

Over the centuries the 6 wapentakes became 8 and then 6 hundreds: Appletree, High Peak, Morleston and Litchurch, Reporton and Gresley, Scarsdale, and Wirksworth. The dates over which this process happened are not clear but they are recorded as 8 separate hundreds in the Hundred Roll of 1273 and, whilst some were combined, they continued until the late 19th century (as reported in Magna Britannia Volume 5 in 1817 and in The National Gazetteer of Great Britain and Ireland of 1868).

=== Appletree ===
Recorded as Apeltre in 1273 and held by Edmund, Earl of Lancaster by grant from King Edward I. It was held by the Vernon aristocratic family on lease from the Duchy of Lancaster from 1660 until the 1800s.

Included the parishes of: Barton-Blount, Boylston, Bradley, Brailsford, Breadsall, Church-Broughton, Cubley, Dalbury, Doveridge, Duffield, Edlaston, Etwall, Kedleston, Longford, Marston-on-Dove, Norbury, Radborne, Scropton, Shirley, Somersall-Herbert, Spondon, Sudbury, Sutton-on-the-Hill, Trusley.

=== High Peak ===
This hundred and Wirksworth hundred were formed from the old Hamestan wapentake and perhaps Peche-fers district in 1086. It was called Peck wapentake by 1273. In 1817 the Duke of Devonshire was leasing the High Peak hundred from the Duchy of Lancaster.

Included the parishes of: Bakewell, Castleton, Chapel-en-le-Frith, Edensor, Glossop, Hathersage, Hope, Tideswell, Eyam.

=== Morleston and Litchurch ===
Morlestan or Morleystone wapentake and Littlechirch wapentake were separate in the Domesday Survey of 1086 and in the Hundred Roll of 1273. By 1300, they were combined as the hundred of Morleston and Litchurch.

Included the parishes of: Aston-on-Trent, Barrow, Breaston, Crich, Derby, Egginton, Elvaston, Heanor, Horsley, Ilkeston, Kirk-Hallam, Langley, Mackworth, Mickle-Over, Morley, Mugginton, Ockbrook, Pentrich, Sandiacre, Sawley, Stanton-by-Dale, Wellington, West-Hallam, Weston-on-Trent.

=== Repton and Gresley ===
Formed from the earlier Domesday hundred of Walecross. In 1273, there were separate wapentakes of Repindon (held by Edmund, Earl of Lancaster by grant from King Edward I.) and Greselegh (owned by the heirs of the Earl of Chester respectively). In 1817, Sir Henry Crewe was lord of Repton and Gresley hundred.

Included the parishes of: Calke, Chellaston, Church-Gresley, Croxall, Hartshorn, Lullington, Melbourne, Ravenstone, Repton, Stanton-by-Bridge, Stapenhill, Stretton-in-the-Field, Walton-on-Trent, Willesley, Swarkston.

=== Scarsdale ===
Known as Scarvedale wapentake from the Domesday Survey. In 1273, it belonged to Nicholas Lord Wake. In 1817, it was held by the Duke of Devonshire.

Included the parishes of: Alfreton, Ashover, Barlborough, Beighton, Blackwell, Bolsover, Chesterfield, Clown, Dronfield, Duckmanton, Eckington, Elmton, Halt-Hucknall, Heath, Langwith, Morton, North-Winfield, Norton, Pinxton, Pleasley, Scarcliffe, Shirland, South-Normanton, South-Winfield, Stavely, Sutton-in-the-Dale, Tibshelf, Whittington, Whitwell.

=== Wirksworth ===
This hundred and High Peak hundred were formed from the old Hamestan wapentake. Recorded as Wyrkesworth in 1273 and still called a wapentake as late as 1817.

Included the parishes of: Ashborne, Bonsall, Bradborne, Carsington, Darley, Fenny-Bentley, Hartington, Kirk-Ireton, Kniveton, Mappleton, Matlock, Wirksworth, Thorp, Youlgrave.

== See also ==
- Derbyshire Domesday Books tenants-in-chief
- History of Derbyshire
- Hundreds in England
