= Beans and Bacon mine =

Disused lead mine in Derbyshire, England

Coordinates: 53.129611°N 1.621353°W

The Beans and Bacon mine is a disused lead mine on Bonsall Moor near the village of Bonsall, Derbyshire, England. The nearest large town is Matlock. The mine was in operation from 1920 to 1925, but workings around the mine date back to at least 1740 and some are thought to be medieval, making it of some archaeological importance. No reason has been given for the mine's unusual name, but other mines in the area include Mule Spinner, Frogs Hole, Cackle Mackle and Wanton Legs, making the name typical for the area.

The mine is one of a group in the area scheduled under the Ancient Monuments and Archaeological Areas Act 1979 as an ancient monument of national importance. The Beans and Bacon mine site includes five coes (stone sheds), one of which contains the founder shaft in one compartment, and the workings descend more than 55 m (180 ft). The site is one of only two that show numerous different methods of rock breakage on such a small site. These methods include plug and feather, gad and wedge, and gunpowder blasting.

In September 2014 a cow was rescued from the Beans and Bacon mine after falling 4 m (13 ft) down a shaft. Rescuers enlarged another entrance and coaxed the animal out.
