= Lancashire Domesday Book tenants-in-chief =

List of Lancashire land owners in the Domesday Book

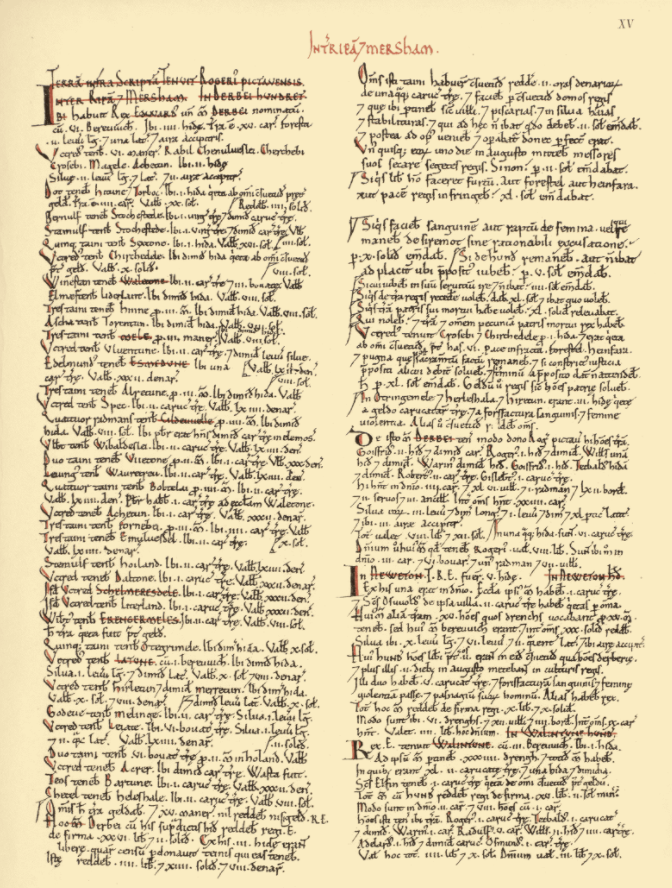
South Lancashire (Inter Ripam et Mersam) in the Domesday Book

The Domesday Book of 1086 AD identifies King William the Conqueror's tenants-in-chief for historic Lancashire within Cestrescire (Cheshire) and Eurvicscire (Yorkshire). At the time of the Norman Conquest of England, the County of Cheshire included Inter Ripam et Mersam (between the River Ribble and River Mersey) which became South Lancashire (now including parts of Merseyside and Greater Manchester), while the West Riding (West Treding) of the County of Yorkshire included what became North Lancashire.

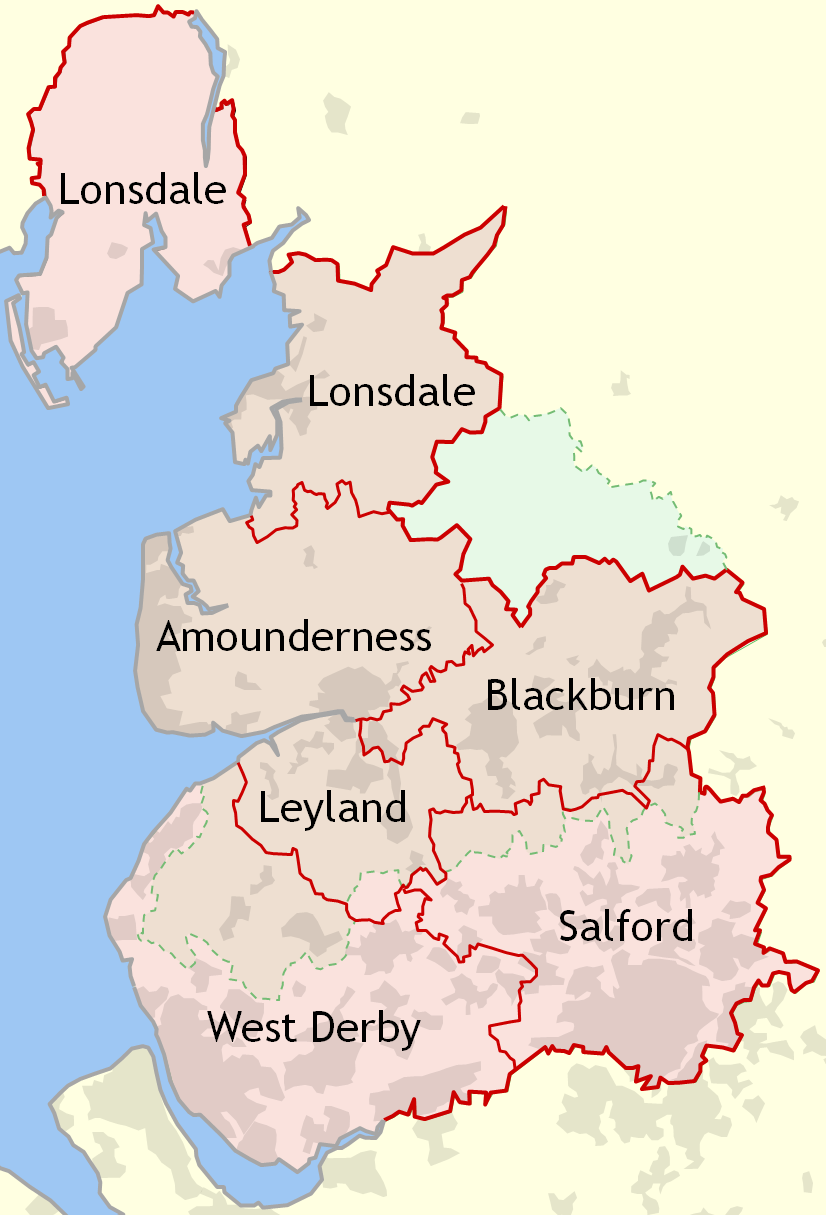
Ancient hundreds of Lancashire

Tenants-in-chief for lands in historic Cheshire:

- Roger de Poitou was awarded over 50 lands including Blackburn, Crosby, Formby, Huyton, Kirkby, Knowsley, Leyland, Maghull, Manchester, Newton-le-Willows, Rochdale, Salford, Skelmersdale, Speke, Upholland, Warrington and West Derby. He was the son of Roger de Montgomery and he was one of William the Conqueror's main advisers. King Henry I confiscated all of his land between the River Ribble and the River Mersey, after Roger and his brothers' failed rebellion in 1102.

Tenants-in-chief for lands in historic Yorkshire:

- King William (c.1028–1087) held most lands that now form North Lancashire. He was the first Norman King of England (after the Battle of Hastings in 1066 AD) and he was Duke of Normandy from 1035. His lands included: Aighton; Aldcliffe; Ashton-on-RIbble; Bare; Barton; Bispham; Bolton le Sands; Broughton; Carleton; Carnforth; Catterall; Chipping; Claughton; Clifton; Elswick; Eccleston; Fishwick (Preston); Forton; Freckleton; Garstang; Goosnargh; Greenhalgh; Grimsargh; Halton; Hambleton; Heaton; Heysham; Hutton; Inskip; Kirkham; Lancaster; Layton; Lea; Lytham; Marton (Blackpool); Middleton; Mythop; Nether Kellet; Newsham; Newton; Out Rawcliffe; Over Kellet; Overton; Oxcliffe; Plumpton; Poulton le Fylde; Preesall; Preston; Ribby; Ribchester; Rossall; Salwick; Singleton; Slyne; Staining; Stalmine; St Michael's on Wyre; Thornton; Thurnham; Torrisholme; Treales; Upper Rawcliffe; Warton; Weeton; Westby; Wheatley; Whittingham; Woodplumpton.

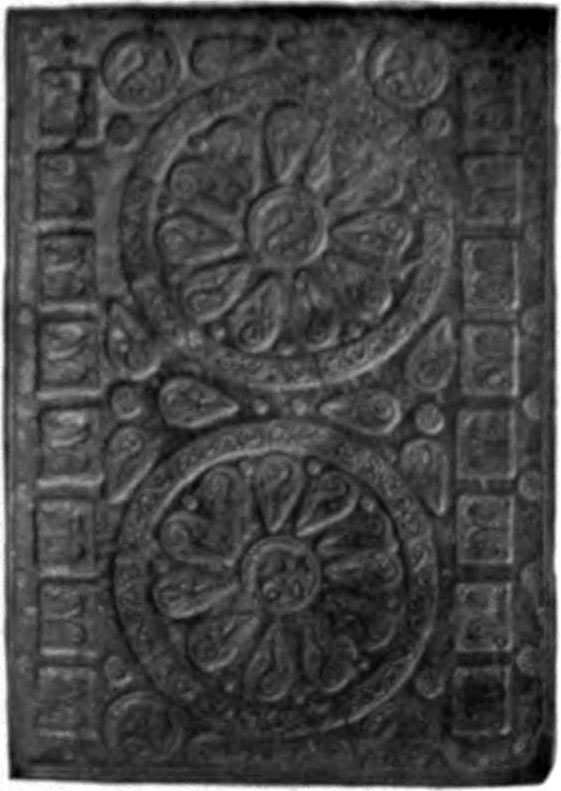
Cover of the Winchester Domesday Book of the 12th century

== See also ==
- Cheshire Domesday Books tenants-in-chief
- Derbyshire Domesday Book tenants-in-chief
