= Newton-with-Clifton =

Civil parish in Lancashire, England

Coordinates: 53.771662°N 2.841502°W

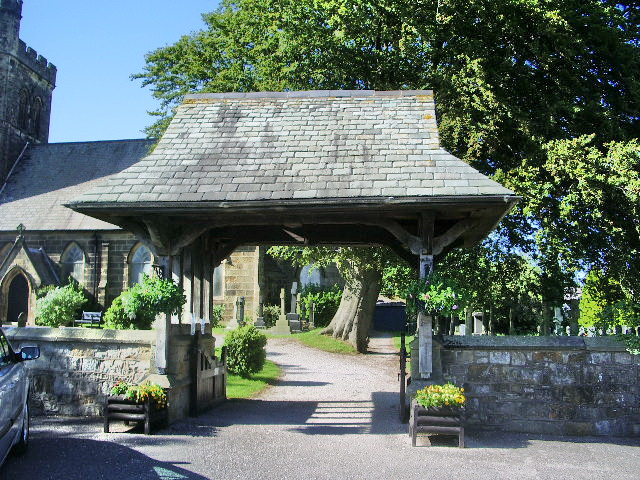
- Lychgate at St John the Evangelist Church

- Shown within Fylde Borough Shown within the Fylde Location within Lancashire
- Population: 2,735 (2011)
- OS grid reference: SD4430
- Civil parish: Newton-with-Clifton
- District: Fylde
- Shire county: Lancashire
- Region: North West
- Country: England
- Sovereign state: United Kingdom
- Post town: PRESTON
- Postcode district: PR4
- Dialling code: 01772
- Police: Lancashire
- Fire: Lancashire
- Ambulance: North West
- UK Parliament: Fylde

Newton-with-Clifton is a civil parish in the Borough of Fylde and ceremonial county of Lancashire in England. It had a population of 2,735 at the 2011 census, up from 2,680 in 2001. The parish includes the villages of Clifton, Dowbridge, Newton-with-Scales and Salwick.

== Notable people ==
- Robert Gradwell (1777–1833), an English Catholic bishop.
- George Brown (1784–1856), an English prelate, the first Roman Catholic Bishop of Liverpool from 1850 to 1856.

== See also ==
- Listed buildings in Newton-with-Clifton
