= Newton-with-Scales =

Village in Fylde Borough, Lancashire, England

Coordinates: 53.771°N 2.841°W

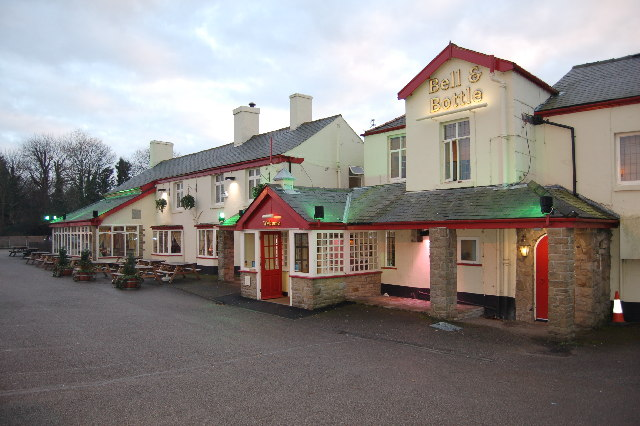
- The Bell and Bottle public house, Newton With Scales

- Shown within Fylde Borough Shown within the Fylde Location within Lancashire
- OS grid reference: SD446309
- Civil parish: Newton-with-Clifton
- District: Fylde
- Shire county: Lancashire
- Region: North West
- Country: England
- Sovereign state: United Kingdom
- Post town: PRESTON
- Postcode district: PR4
- Dialling code: 01772
- Police: Lancashire
- Fire: Lancashire
- Ambulance: North West
- UK Parliament: Fylde

Newton-with-Scales is a village and former civil parish, now in the parish of Newton-with-Clifton, in the Fylde district, in the county of Lancashire, England. It is situated on the A583 road, 5 miles (8 km) from Preston and 11 miles (18 km) from Blackpool. It has a park situated on School Lane, a Marston's pub called the Bell and Bottle, a primary school called Newton Bluecoats, a shop called the convenience store which also has a Post Office.

Formerly the village was two hamlets: Scales on the main road from Preston to Kirkham, and Newton on a loop to the south. The name Newton is from Old English, meaning "new farm" or "new village"; Scales is from a word of Scandinavian origin meaning "hut".

Newton was mentioned in the Domesday Book as a member of the fee of Earl Tostig. By 1212 it had become part of the barony of Penwortham. In the 16th century both Newton and Scales were referred to as manors. Newton Bluecoat school was established in 1707 by John Hornby for boys and girls up to the age of 14 years; it is now a primary school. It was rebuilt in 1864, and replaced by a new building in 1969.

Formerly a rural community, it has expanded with many new houses built since the 1940s. Since World War II, Springfields nuclear fuel production site and British Aerospace at Warton Aerodrome have been major employers in the area, and also by the 1980s many residents worked in Preston, Blackpool and other towns in the region.

== Civil parish ==
The township of Newton-with-Scales was part of the parish of Kirkham; from 1866 Newton with Scales was a civil parish in its own right, it formed part of Fylde Rural District. Located east of Freckleton and west of Clifton, the township extended north from the River Ribble to boundaries with Kirkham to the north-west and Treales, Roseacre and Wharles to the north. It included the hamlet of Dowbridge on the main road near Kirkham. As of 1912 it consisted of 1,522 1/2 acres (including around 15 acres of tidal water in the Ribble estuary). Most of the area was pasture. The southern part, crossed by the Preston to Freckleton road, is flat and includes reclaimed land close to the river; the village is to the north on a slope that rises to 50 feet. As of the 1931 census the civil parish of Newton-with-Scales had a population of 343. On 1 April 1934 it merged with Clifton-with-Salwick (1931 census population: 428) to form Newton-with-Clifton.

== Nearby towns and villages ==
- Clifton
- Freckleton
- Kirkham
- Preston
- Salwick
- Wrea Green
- Blackpool

== See also ==
- Listed buildings in Newton-with-Clifton
