= Salwick railway station =

Railway station in Lancashire, England

Salwick
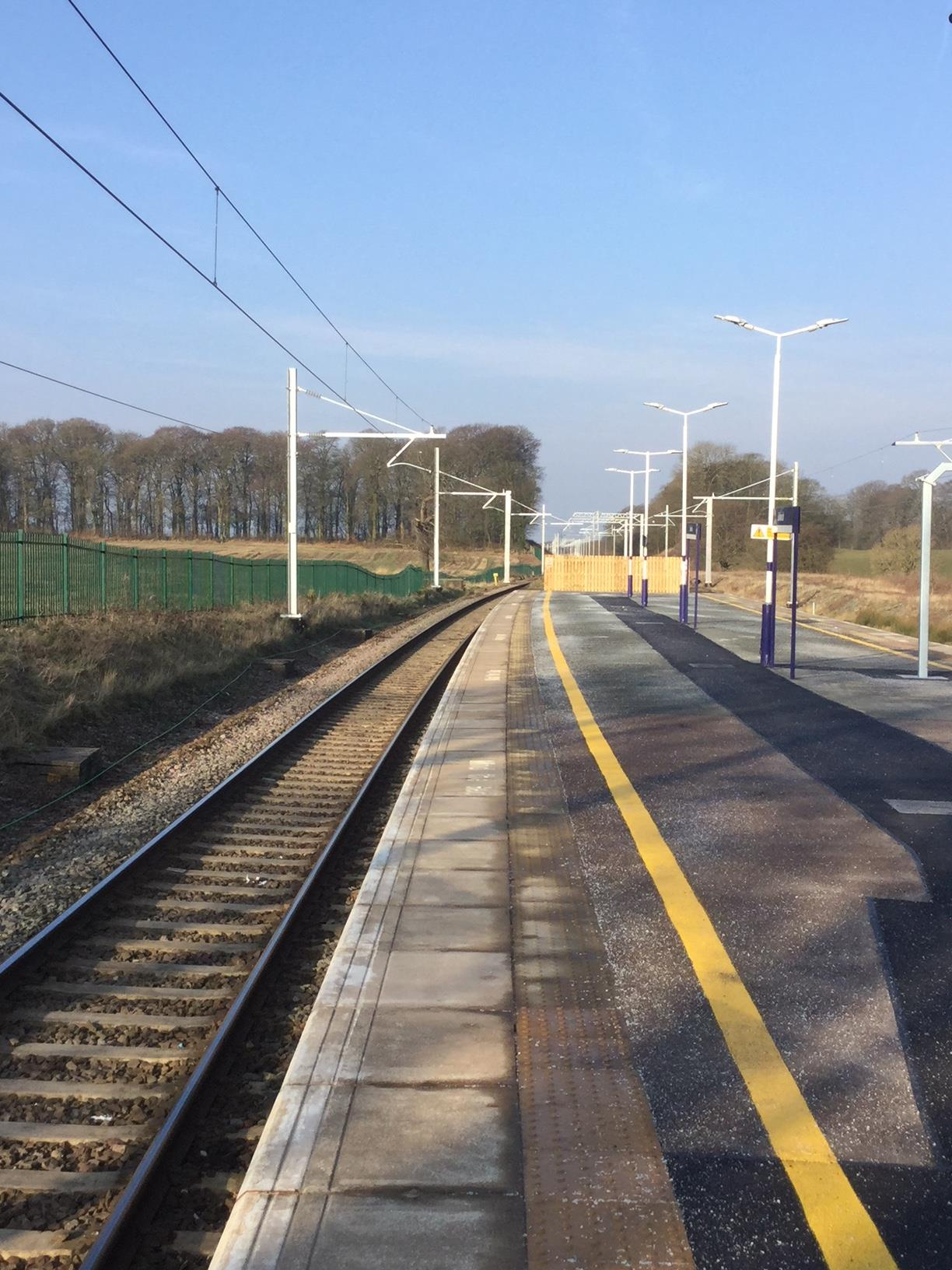

General information
- Location: Salwick, Fylde, England
- Coordinates: 53.7819°N 2.8195°W
- Grid reference: SD461320
- Manager: Northern Trains
- Platforms: 2

Other information
- Station code: SLW
- Classification: DfT category F2

History
- Original company: Preston and Wyre Joint Railway
- Pre-grouping: Lancashire and Yorkshire Railway & London and North Western Railway (joint)
- Post-grouping: London Midland and Scottish Railway

Key dates
- 1842: Opened as Salwick Road
- June 1842: Renamed Salwick
- 2 May 1938: Closed
- 8 April 1940: Reopened

Passengers
- 2021/22: ▲1,820
- 2022/23: ▼1,532
- 2023/24: ▲1,548
- 2024/25: ▲1,624
- 2025/26: ▲1,844
Location
Notes
- Passenger statistics from the Office of Rail and Road

Salwick railway station serves the village of Salwick, in Lancashire, England; it lies near to the village of Clifton. It is a stop on the Blackpool South branch line, 5 1/4 miles (8.4 km) west of Preston. The station, and all services stopping here, are operated by Northern Trains.

== History ==
The station was opened as Salwick Road in 1842 and renamed Salwick shortly afterwards.

It was closed on 2 May 1938, along with Lea Road to the east, but was reopened on 8 April 1940 to serve the adjacent industrial complex.

Lancashire County Council has pledged to construct a new station at nearby Cottam, which may require the closure of Salwick station.

=== Modernisation ===
The modernisation and electrification of the Preston to Blackpool North line, and hence the station, was announced in December 2009. This included rebuilding and raising the road bridge in the station vicinity for necessary electrification clearance and completely new signalling of the entire line, along with rationalisation of the lines and removal of the spur into the nuclear facility nearby. The removal of the signal box, along with four others along the line, was included as part of the works. This resulted in a total blockade of the line as far as Kirkham and Wesham, and thus including Salwick station, from 11 November 2017 until 29 January 2018.

== Service ==
The typical off-peak service operated by Northern Trains in trains per day is:

- 3tpd to Blackpool South
- 3tpd to Preston.

Trains do not call at Salwick on Sundays.

It is used by very few passengers, as low as 1,404 in 2018-19, but provides a commuter service for the workers at the nearby Springfields Westinghouse nuclear fuel production complex.

Preceding station	National Rail	Following station
Kirkham and Wesham	Northern Trains Blackpool Branch Line (southern) (Limited service)	Preston
	Historical railways	
Kirkham and Wesham	Preston and Wyre Joint Railway	Lea Road

== Gallery ==
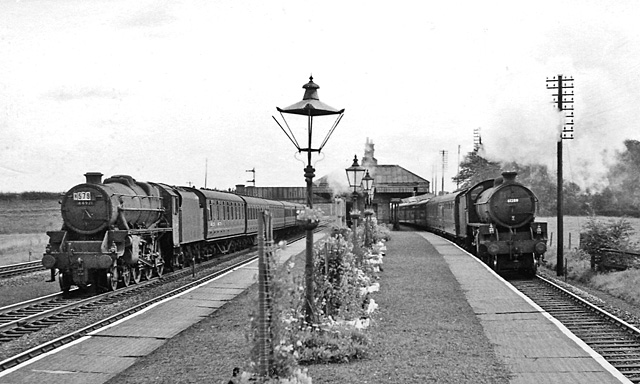
View eastwards towards Preston, 1959

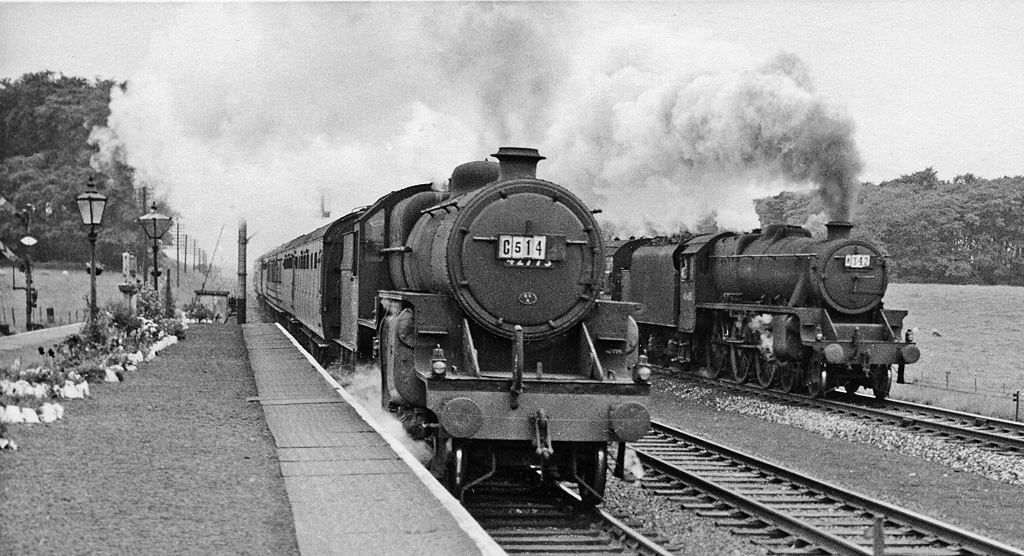
Up expresses at Salwick, 1959

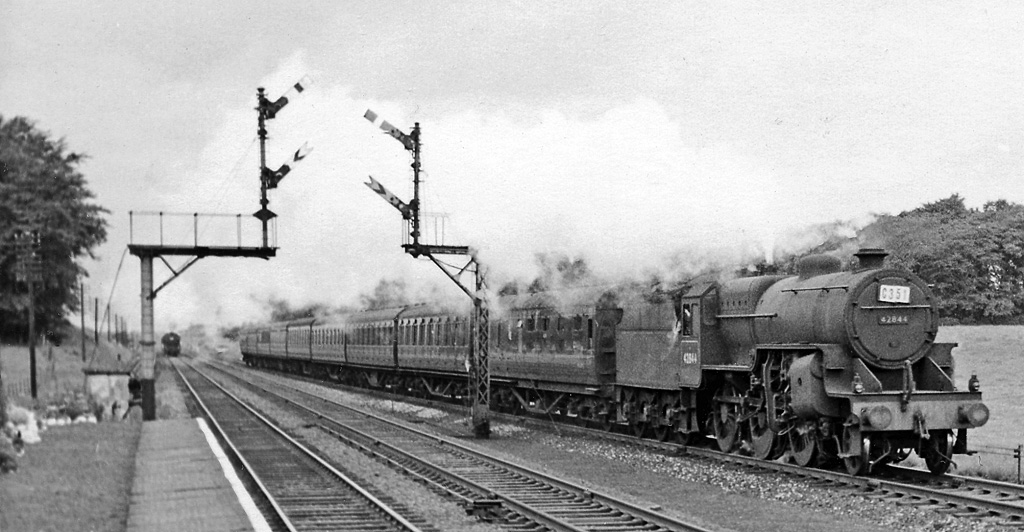
View westward towards Kirkham, 1959

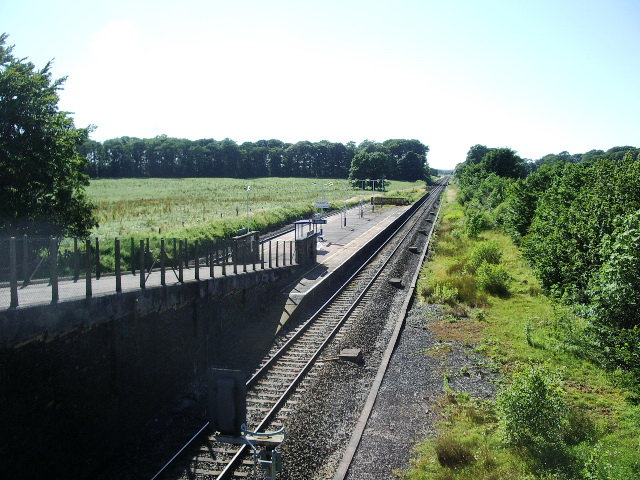
The station in 2007.

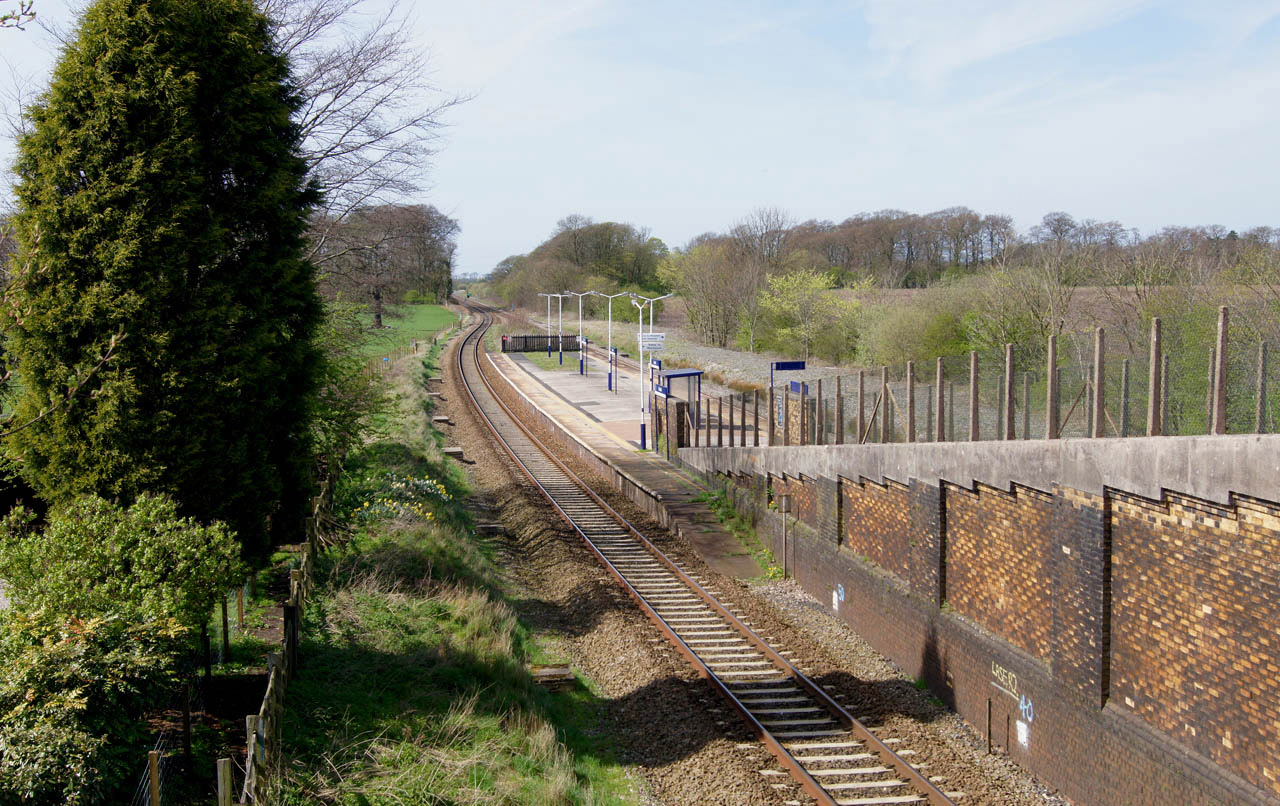
View westwards towards Kirkham, 2011

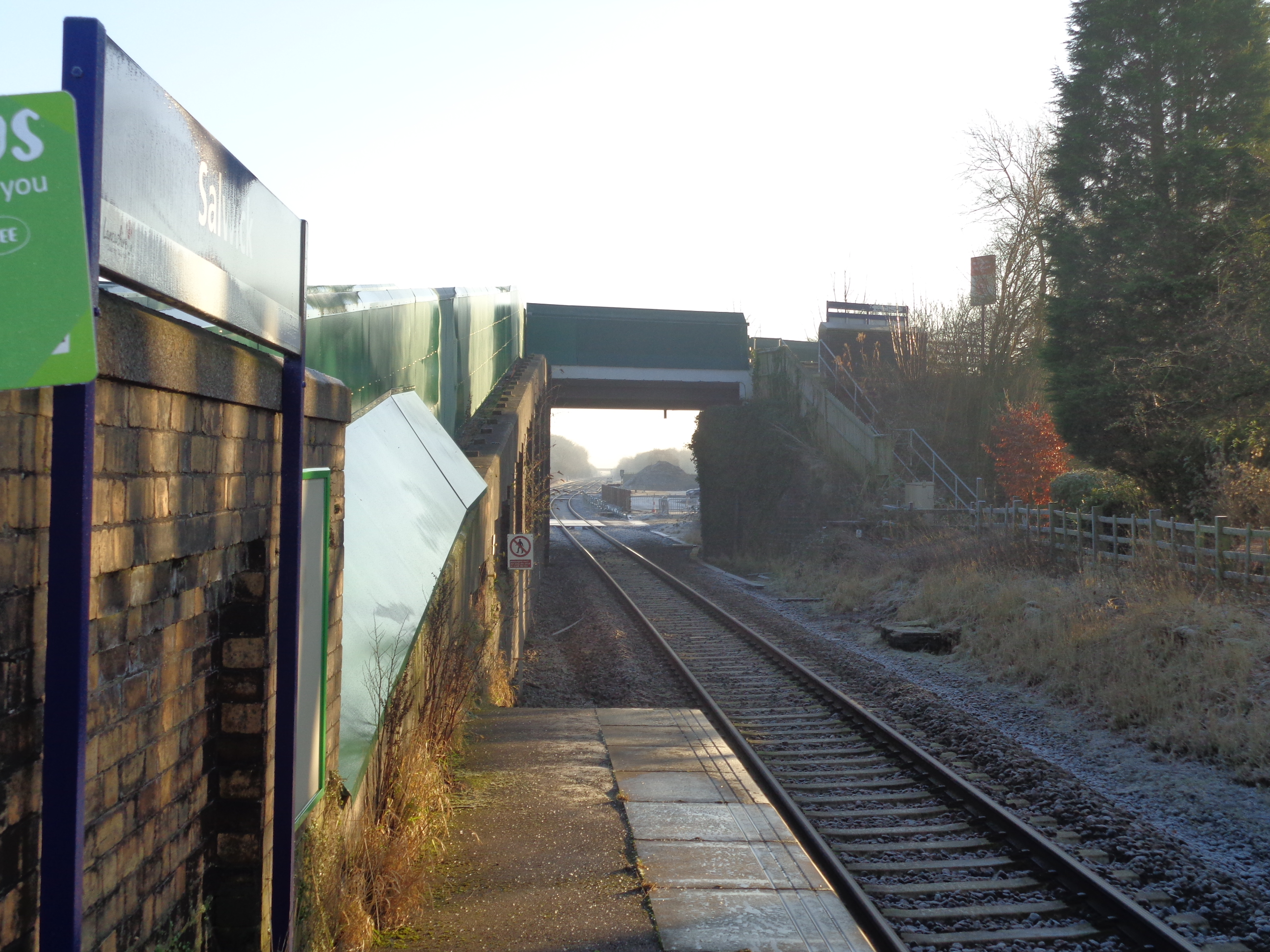
The south side looking east to Preston

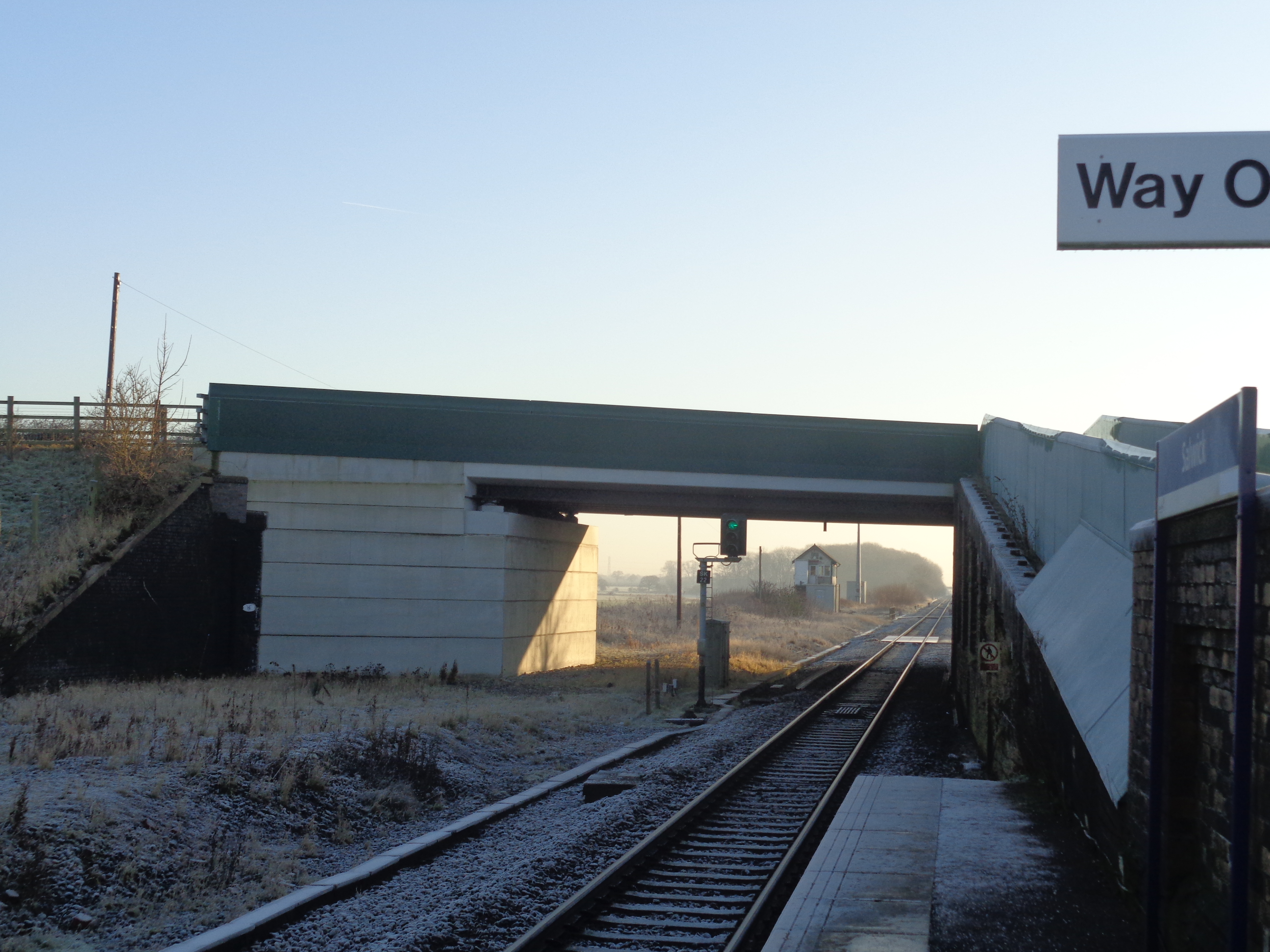
The station site during reconstruction and electrification

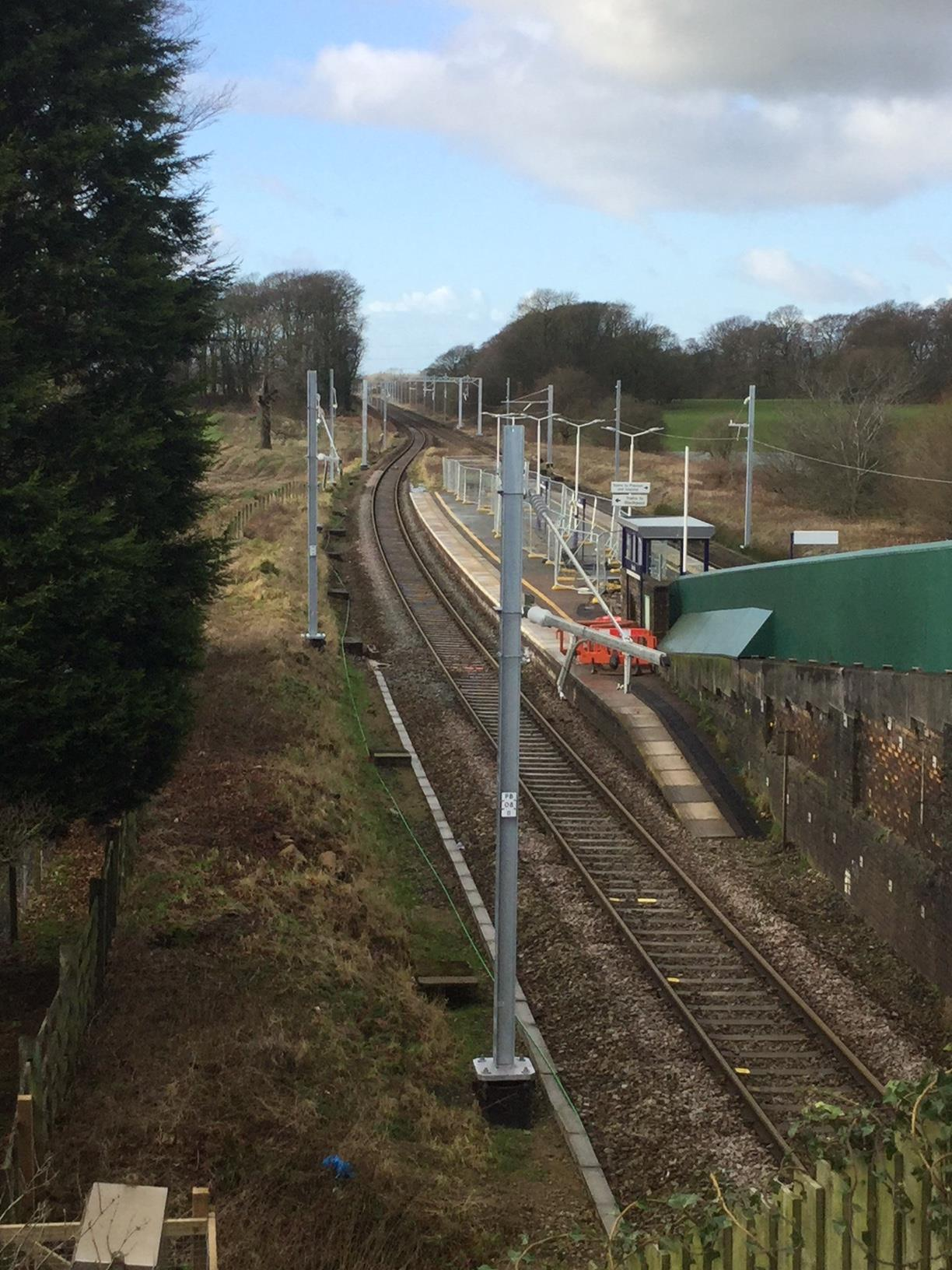
Electrification masts being erected
