= Cheshire Domesday Book tenants-in-chief =

List of Cheshire land owners in the Domesday Book

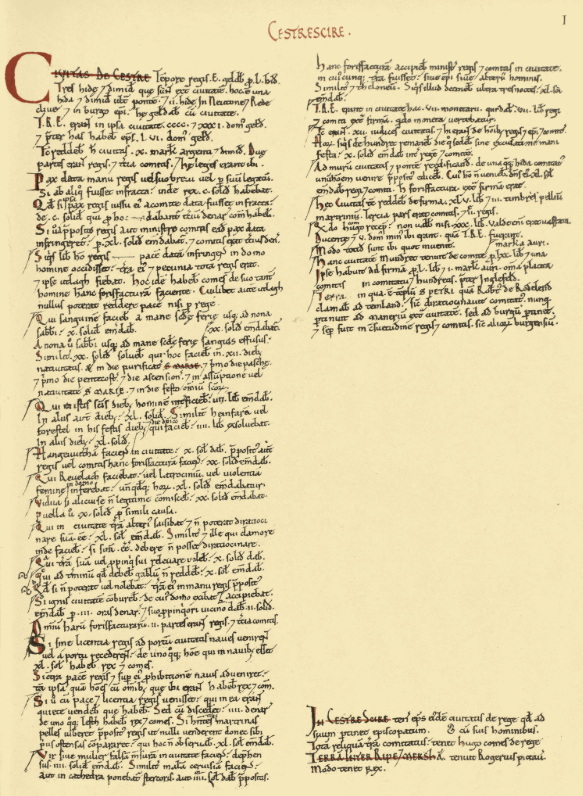
First page for Cheshire in the Domesday Book

The Domesday Book of 1086 AD identifies King William the Conqueror's tenants-in-chief in Cestrescire (Cheshire), following the Norman Conquest of England. At the time, the County of Cheshire included South Lancashire and most of modern Flintshire and Wrexham counties in north Wales.

In Cheshire, the Bishop of Chester held his own bishopric. Earl Hugh of Chester (and his men) held nearly all the rest of the county.

Cheshire Hundreds in the Domesday Book

Tenants-in-chief for Cheshire:

- King William (c. 1028–1087), held some land in Chester. He was the first Norman King of England (after the Battle of Hastings in 1066 AD) and he was Duke of Normandy from 1035.
- Bishop of Chester (St John) held land in Chester and 8 villages including Tarvin.
- Canons of Chester (St Werburgh), for over 20 villages.
- Earl Hugh of Chester (c. 1047–1101) contributed 60 ships to the invasion of England, but did not fight at the Battle of Hastings.
- Earl Hugh's men:
  - Robert son of Hugh (for 30 villages, mostly in the hundred of Duddeston)
  - Robert of Rhuddlan (for over 50 villages, mostly in the hundred of Ati's Cross including Prestayn), cousin of Earl Hugh. Welshman Robert also claimed the hundred of Arwystli, which Earl Roger of Shrewsbury held.
  - Robert the cook (for Hardgrave and Little Neston)
  - Richard of Vernon (for 14 villages, half of which in the hundred of Middlewich, as well as Audlem and Crewe)
  - Richard the butler (for Calvitone and Poulton)
  - Walter of Vernon (for Ledsham, Ness, Prenton and Willington)
  - William Malbank (for nearly 50 villages, mostly in the hundred of Warmundestrou)
  - William son of Nigel (for 30 villages including Knutsford)
  - Hugh Delamere (for Great Caldy, Handbridge, Overleigh and Redcliff)
  - Hugh son of Norman (for 9 villages)
  - Hugh son of Osbern (for 10 villages)
  - Haimo of Mascy (for 11 villages)
  - Bigot of Les Loges (for Congleton, Mobberley, Nether Alderley, Sandbach and 10 other villages)
  - Baldric of Lindsey (for Cocle)
  - Gilbert of Venables
  - Gilbert the hunter (for 20 villages including Lymm and Tarporley)
  - Jocelyn of Tuschet (for Croxton, Nether Tabley and Newton)
  - Ranulf of Mainwaring (for 19 villages)
  - Ralph the hunter (for Broughton, Soughton and Stapleford)
  - Reginald the sheriff (for Erbistock and Gresford), he was also tenant-in-chief for 70 settlements in Shropshire
  - Ilbert of Roullours (for Clotton, Hatton and Waverton)
  - Osbern son of Tezzo (for 11 villages)
  - Nigel of Burcy (for Greasby, Oulton and Storeton)

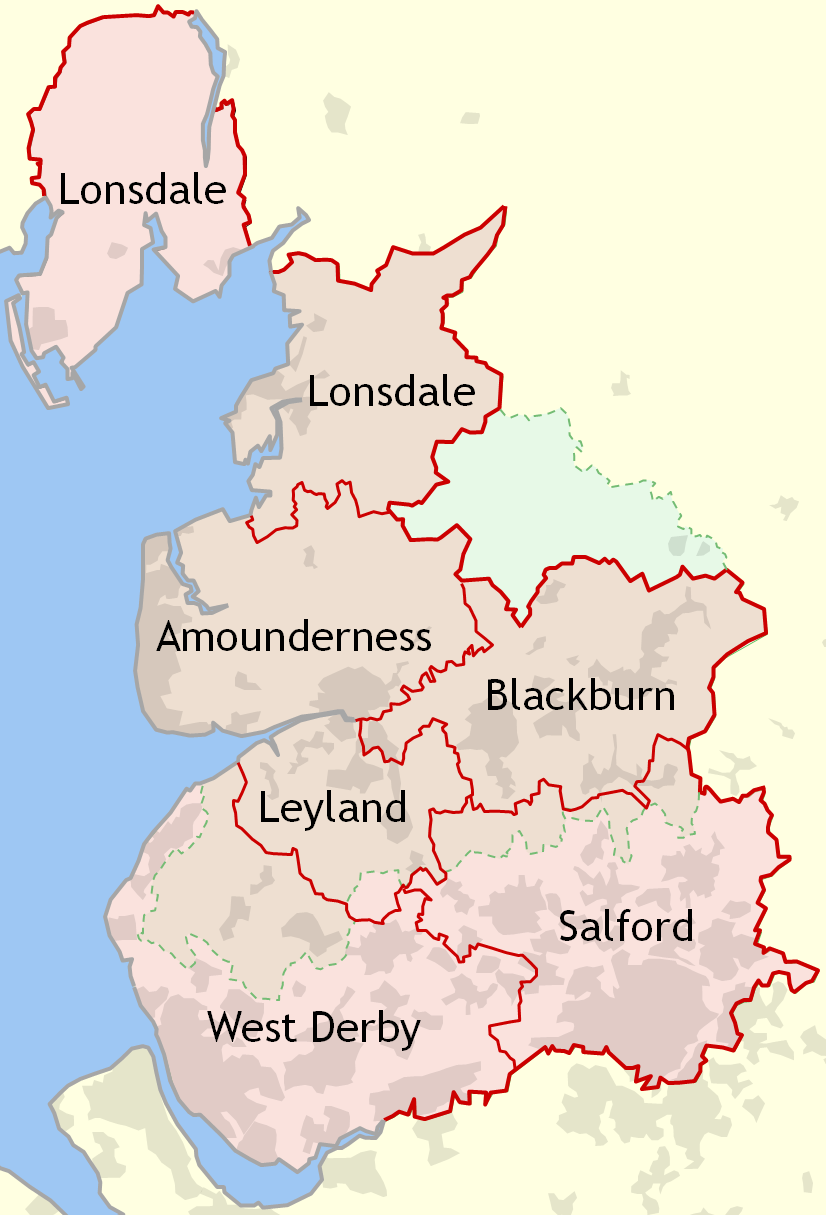
Ancient hundreds of modern Lancashire

- Roger de Poitou (for over 50 places including West Derby, Leyland, Blackburn, Manchester, Rochdale, Salford and Warrington), son of Roger de Montgomery. He was one of William the Conqueror's main advisers. King Henry I confiscated all of his land between the River Ribble and the River Mersey, after Roger and his brothers' failed rebellion in 1102.

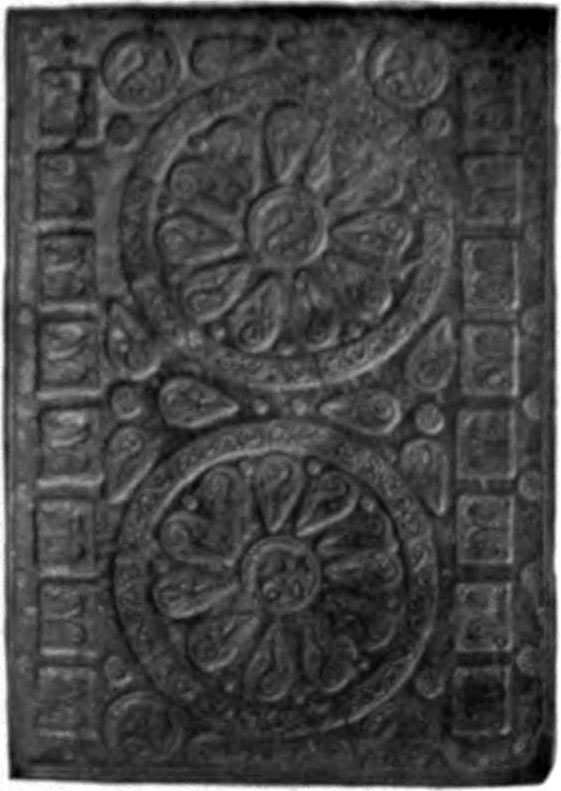
Cover of the Winchester Domesday Book of the 12th century

== See also ==
- History of Cheshire
- Derbyshire Domesday Books tenants-in-chief
- Lancashire Domesday Book tenants-in-chief
- Nottinghamshire Domesday Book tenants-in-chief
