= Lea Road railway station =

Disused station in Lancashire, England

Lea Road

General information
- Location: Lea Road, Preston, City of Preston; England
- Coordinates: 53.7753°N 2.7674°W
- Grid reference: SD49553127
- Platforms: 2

Other information
- Status: Disused

History
- Original company: Preston and Wyre Joint Railway
- Pre-grouping: Lancashire and Yorkshire Railway / London and North Western Railway
- Post-grouping: London, Midland and Scottish Railway

Key dates
- 1842: Opened
- 2 May 1938: Closed
Location

Maps showing
Lea Road Station

Old OS Maps (estimated 1925 to 1945)
NPE Maps (1947)
Vision of Britain
OS 1:2500 Map on MARIO (1892)
OS 1:10000 Map on MARIO (1848)
Other maps

53.7753°N 2.7674°W

Lea Road railway station (/ˈliːə/ LEE-ə) was on the Preston and Wyre Joint Railway in the parish of Lea and Cottam in Preston, Lancashire, England. It opened in 1842, and closed on 2 May 1938.

Lea Road was located adjacent to the site of the proposed Cottam railway station.

Preceding station	Historical railways	Following station
Salwick	Preston and Wyre; Joint Railway	Maudlands until 1844, and excursions
Salwick	Preston and Wyre; Joint Railway	Preston from 1844
