= Derbyshire Domesday Book tenants-in-chief =

List of Derbyshire land owners in the Domesday Book

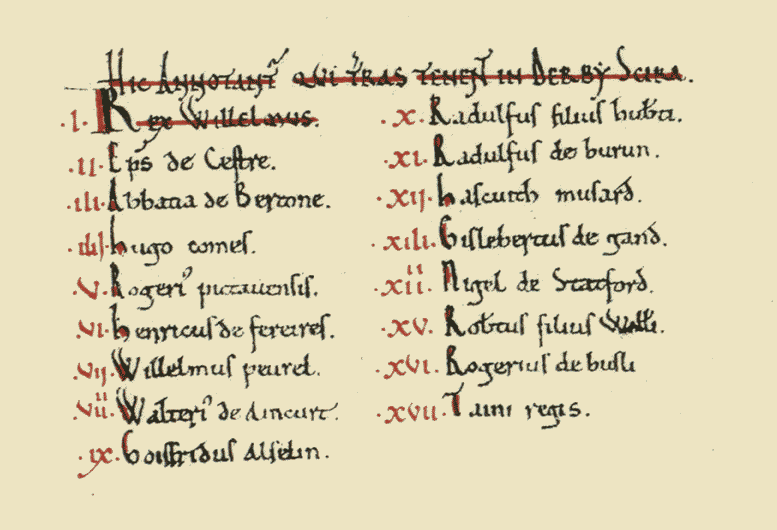
HIC ANNOTANTUR TENENTES TERRAS IN DERBYSCIRE ["Here are noted (those) holding lands in Derbyshire"]: i Rex Willelmus ii Eps de Cestre iii Abbatia de Bertone iv Hugo comes v Rogeri pictauensis vi Henricus de fereires vii Willelmus peurel viii Walteri de aincurt ix Goiffridus alselin x Radulfus filius huba xi Radulfus de burun xii Hascurch musard xiii Gilleberais de gand xiv Nigel de Statford xv Robais filius Wille xvi Rogerius de bulle xvii Taini regis

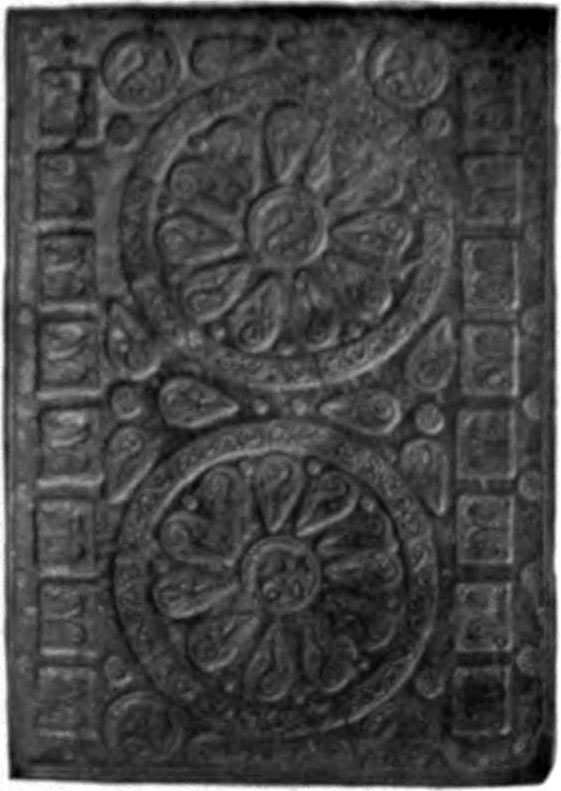
Cover of the Winchester Domesday Book of the 12th century

The Domesday Book of 1086 AD lists (in the following order) King William the Conqueror's tenants-in-chief in Derbyscire (Derbyshire), following the Norman Conquest of England:

- King William (c. 1028 - 1087), the first Norman King of England (after the Battle of Hastings in 1066 AD) and he was Duke of Normandy from 1035.
- Bishop of Chester (St John)
- Abbey of Burton (St Mary & St Modwen)
- Earl Hugh of Chester (c. 1047 - 1101) contributed 60 ships to the invasion of England, but did not fight at the Battle of Hastings.
- Roger de Poitou, his father Roger de Montgomery was one of William the Conqueror's main advisers.
- Henry de Ferrers, served William the Conqueror and his successor King William II in administrative roles.
- William Peverel (c. 1040 - c. 1115), granted over a hundred manors in central England from the king, forming the Honour of Peverel, in Nottinghamshire and Derbyshire, including Nottingham Castle. He also built Peveril Castle at Castleton in Derbyshire.
- Walter D'Aincourt, was connected by marriage to William the Conqueror and was awarded over 70 manors in the East Midlands and Yorkshire.
- Geoffrey Alselin
- Ralph son of Hubert (FitzHubert), (1045 - 1086), son of Hubert de Corcun (Derei).
- Ralph de Buron
- Hascoit Musard de Bretagne, served in the Breton section of William the Conqueror's army at the Battle of Hastings and was granted 25 manors in 6 English counties. He established his family estate at Staveley, Derbyshire.
- Gilbert de Gant (Ghent), (c. 1048 - 1095), was related to William the Conqueror's wife.
- Nigel de Stafford (1040 - ?), son of Robert de Stafford of Belvoir Castle.
- Robert Curthose (c. 1051 - 1134), son of William the Conqueror and succeeded him as Duke of Normandy in 1087 AD.
- Roger de Busli (c. 1038 - c. 1099), granted 86 manors in Nottinghamshire, 46 in Yorkshire, and others in Derbyshire, Lincolnshire, Leicestershire and Devon. They became the Honour of Blyth (later renamed the Honour of Tickhill).
- King's Thanes

Individual records of places in Derbyshire identify these additional tenants-in-chief:

- Dunning and Stenulf of Sutton, lands in Callow
- Edmund, lands in Lullington
- Ernwy of Stanton, lands in Clowne, Ingleby and Stanton-by-Bridge
- Healfdene of Cromwell, manor of Vlvritune
- Leofwin of Aston, lands in Coal Aston and Handley
- Osmund Benz, lands in Cellesdene, Cottons, Denby, Ilkeston, Osmaston and Sandiacre
- Toli of Sandiacre, lands in Ilkeston and Sandiacre

In the Domesday Book, Derbyshire was divided into the 6 wapentakes of Apultre, Hamestan, Littlechirch, Morlestan, Scarvedale, and Walecross, and a district called Peche-fers (Peak Forest).

Tenant-in-Chief	Lands
King William	Alsop-en-le-Dale, Ashbourne, Ashford-in-the-Water, Aston, Aston-on-Trent, Bakewell, Barlow, Barrow-upon-Trent, Baslow, Beeley, Birchills, Blackwell, Bonsall, Boythorpe, Bretby, Brimington, Broadlowash, Bubnell, Burley, Burton, Callow, Calver, Carsington, Charlesworth, Chatsworth, Chellaston, Chesterfield, Chilcote, Chisworth and Higher Chisworth, Chunal, Clifton Campville, Cold Eaton, Conksbury, Cotes, Cottons, Cromford, Darley, Derby, Dronfield, Eckington, Edale, Edingale, Eyam, Farley, Fenny Bentley, Flagg, Great Longstone, Greyhirst, Hadfield, Hanson Grange, Hassop, Hayfield, Higher and Lower Dinting, Hognaston, Holme, Hope, Hopton, Ible, Ingleby, Kidsleypark, Killamarsh, Kinder, Kirk Ireton, Langley, Litchurch, Little Chester, Longdendale, Ludworth, Mapleton, Mapperley, Marsh?, Matlock, Matlock Bridge, Measham, Melbourne, Middleton, Milton, Monyash, Muchedeswelle, Nether and Over Haddon, Newbold and Upper Newbold, Newton Solney, Normanton, Norton and Little Norton, Offcote, Offerton, Old Glossop, Old Tupton, Old Whittington, One Ash, Osmaston, Padfield and Little Padfield, Padinc, Parwich, Priestcliffe, Quarndon, Rauenesholm, Repton, Rocester, Rosliston, Rowland, Rowsley, Shardlow, Shatton, Sheldon, Smalley, Snitterton, Stoke, Stoney Middleton, Swarkestone, Taddington, Tansley, Tapton, Temple Normanton, Thornsett, Thorpe, Tibshelf, Ticknall, Tideswell, Totley, Trangesbi, Unstone, Upton, Walton, Walton-on-Trent, Welledene, Wensley, Weston-on-Trent, Whitfield, Willesley, Wingerworth, Wirksworth
Bishop of Chester (St John)	Bupton, Draycott, Hopwell, Long Eaton, Sawley
Abbey of Burton (St Mary & St Modwen)	Appleby Magna, Bearwardcote, Caldwell, Coton-in-the-Elms, Dalbury, Findern, Hilton, Hoon, Littleover, Mickleover, Potlocks, Rodsley, Snelston, Stapenhill, Stretton, Sudbury, Sutton-on-the-Hill, Ticknall, Winshill
Earl Hugh of Chester	Allestree, Kniveton, Mackworth, Markeaton
Roger de Poitou	Beighton, Blingsby, Hardstoft, Lowne, Stainsby, Sutton Scarsdale, Tunstall
Henry de Ferrers	Alkmonton, Arleston, Ashe, Aston, Aston-on-Trent, Atlow, Barrow-upon-Trent, Barton Blount, Bearwardcote, Bentley, Birchover, Bolun, Boylestone, Bradbourne, Bradley (Appletree), Bradley (Morleystone), Brailsford, Brassington, Breadsall, Breaston, Bupton, Burnaston, Catton, Chaddesden, Chellaston, Church Broughton, Cottons, Cowley, Croxall, Dalbury, Donisthorpe, Doveridge, Duffield, Eaton Dovedale, Edensor, Edingale, Edlaston, Elton, Etwall, Fenton, Foston, Gratton, Great and Little Cubley, Harthill, Hartington, Hartshorne, Hatton, Herdebi, Hilton, Holbrook, Hollington, Hoon, Ireton, Ivonbrook Grange, Kedleston, Linton, Little Longstone, Ludwell, Makeney, Marston-on-Dove, Marston Montgomery, Mercaston, Mickleover, Middleton, Milford, Morley, Muchedeswelle, Mugginton, Nether or Over Seal, Newton Grange, Norbury, Normanton, Osleston. Osmaston (Appletree), Osmaston (Litchurch), Pilsbury, Pilsley, Radbourne, Rocester, Rodsley, Roston, Sapperton, Scropton, Sedsall, Shirley, Shottle, Sinfin, Snelston, Soham, Somersal, Spondon, Stanton, Stanton-in-Peak, Stenson, Stretton-en-le-Field, Sturston Hall and Nether Sturston, Sudbury, Sutton-on-the-Hill, Swarkestone, Thulston, Thurvaston, Tissington, Trusley, Twyford, Wallstone, Willesley, Winster, Wormhill, Wyaston, Yeaveley, Yeldersley, Youlgrave
William Peverel	Abney, Bolsover, Bradwell, Castleton, Codnor, Esnotrewic, Glapwell, Great and Little Hucklow, Hazelbadge, Heanor, Langley, Litton, Shirland, Smithycote, South Normanton, South Wingfield, Ufton, Watrefeld
Walter D'Aincourt	Elmton, Holmesfield, Morton, Nether and Upper Pilsley, North Wingfield, Ogston, Old Brampton, Old Tupton, Owlcotes, Stony Houghton, Wadshelf, Wessington, Williamthorpe
Geoffrey Alselin	Alvaston, Ambaston, Breaston, Ednaston, Egginton, Elvaston, Etwall, Hollington, Hulland, Ockbrook, Thulston
Ralph son of Hubert (FitzHubert)	Ashover, Ballidon, Bamford, Barlborough, Barrow-upon-Trent, Beighton, Boulton, Clifton, Clowne, Crich, Duckmanton and Long Duckmanton, Eckington, Egstow, Harthill, Hathersage, Ingleby, Kirk Langley, Lea, Middle Nether and West Handley, Mosborough, Nether and Upper Hurst, Newton, Offerton, Ogston, Palterton, Pentrich, Ripley, Scarcliffe, Shuckstone, Stoney Middleton, Stretton, Tansley, Tunstall, Ufton, Werredune, Wessington, Whitwell, Willington, Wirksworth
Ralph de Buron	Denby, Hallam, Herdebi, Horsley, Weston Underwood
Hascoit Musard de Bretagne	Great Barlow, Holme, Killamarsh, Old Brampton, Staveley, Wadshelf
Gilbert de Gant (Ghent)	Breaston, Ilkeston, Little Hallam, Shipley, Stanton-by-Dale
Nigel de Stafford	Donisthorpe, Drakelowe, Foremark, Hearthcote, Ingleby, Oakthorpe, Ravenstone, Smisby, Stapenhill, Swadlincote, Ticknall, Trangesbi
Robert Curthose	Stanley
Roger de Busli	Alfreton, Beighton, Bramley Vale, Breaston, Dore, Norton and Little Norton, Risley, Rowthorne

== See also ==
- History of Derbyshire
- Hundreds of Derbyshire
- Cheshire Domesday Book tenants-in-chief
- Lancashire Domesday Book tenants-in-chief
- Nottinghamshire Domesday Book tenants-in-chief
