= Cottam Parkway railway station =

Proposed railway station in Preston, England

Cottam Parkway

General information
- Location: Cottam, exact location not fixed, City of Preston; England
- Coordinates: 53.7753°N 2.7674°W
- Manager: Northern
- Platforms: 2

History
- Opening: 2028 (proposed)
Location

Cottam Parkway is a proposed railway station to the west of Preston, England. The proposed station would serve existing and new developments in the Lea civil parish, including 5,000 nearby homes and a local business park in Warton.

== Development ==
As part of the original Preston Local Plan, the station would have been constructed in 2022/23 adjacent to the Preston Western Distributor Road, which links to the M55 motorway. In the amended plan the Cottam station looked set to be removed because of uncertainty over its location. Preston was shortlisted for the Transforming City Fund, including a proposal to fund Cottam railway station. It was then planned to submit a planning application in 2022, which if successful would have led to an opening in 2024 or 2025. The tender notice by Octavia construction puts the dates at 16 March 2026 to 29 September 2028.

The plan is to locate it on the Preston to Blackpool section. Construction may have required the closure of the neighbouring Salwick railway station, as referred to in Page 38 of the Central Lancashire Highways and Transport Masterplan.

In December 2020 Lancashire County Council agreed to acquire land to assist with the construction of the station and access roads, at which point the estimated cost of construction was £22.3 million. LCC submitted a planning application in October 2022. Planning permission for the new station was granted in September 2023 (Lancashire County Council ref LCC/2022/0049). A vote by Preston County Council in August 2024 threatened the entire project, although a negotiated settlement over new homes put the project back on track a few days later.

== Location ==
The station would be near the site of the former Lea Road railway station, between Lea Road and Sidgreaves Lane. It was planned to be part of the construction of a new distributor road linking the M55 with the A583, which began in September 2019 and opened as Edith Rigby Way, part of the A582, on 3 July 2023.

Preceding station	Future services	Following station
Preston	Northern Blackpool branch lines	Salwick
