= Nottinghamshire Domesday Book tenants-in-chief =

List of Nottinghamshire land owners in the Domesday Book

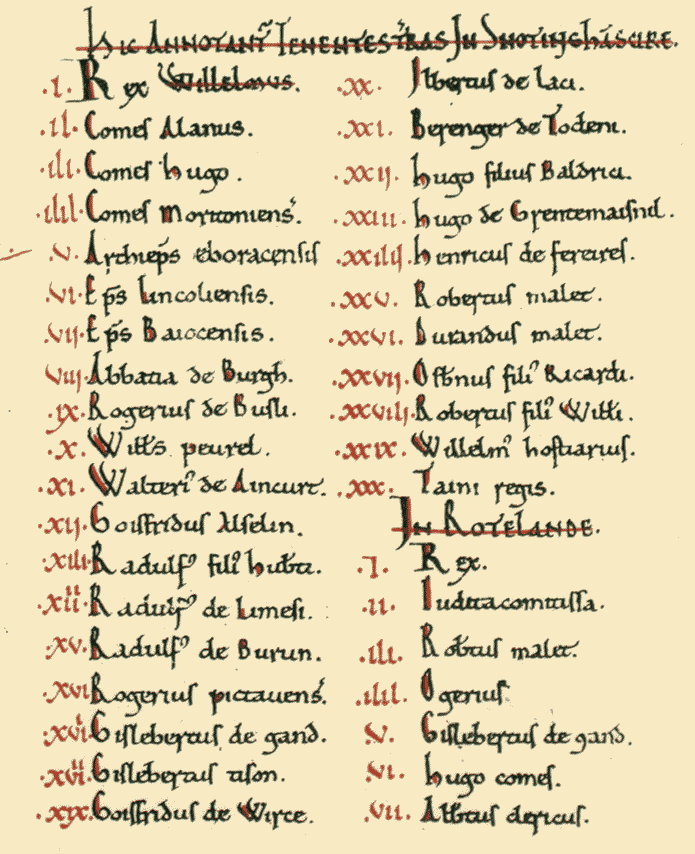
HIC ANNOTANTUR TENENTES TERRAS IN SNOTINGHSCIRE ["Here are noted (those) holding lands in Nottinghamshire"]: i Rex Willelmus ii Comes Alanus iii Comes Hugo iv Comes Morttoniens v Archieps eboracensis vi Eps lincoliensis vii Eps Baiocensis viii Abbatia de Burgh ix Rogerius de Busli x Wills Peurel xi Walteri de Aincurt xii Goiffridus Alselin xiii Radulf fili Hubet xiv Radulf de Limesi xv Radulf de Burun xvi Rogerius Pictauens xvii Gilleberais de gand xviii Gilleberais tison xix Goiffridus de Wirce xx Ilbertus de laci xxi Berenger de Todern xxii Hugo filius Baldrici xxiii Hugo de Grentemaisnil xxiv Henricus de Fereires xxv Robertus malet xxvi Durandus malet xxvii Osbnus fili Ricarti xxviii Robertus fili Willi xxix Willelm Hostiarius xxx Taini regis

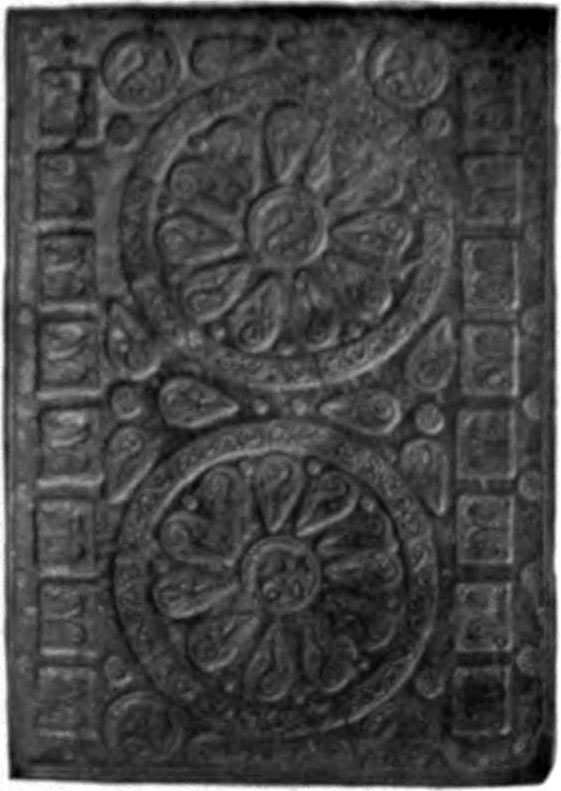
Cover of the Winchester Domesday Book of the 12th century

The Domesday Book of 1086 AD lists (in the following order) King William the Conqueror's tenants-in-chief in Snotinghscire (Nottinghamshire), following the Norman Conquest of England:

- King William (c. 1028 - 1087), the first Norman King of England (after the Battle of Hastings in 1066 AD) and he was Duke of Normandy from 1035.
- Count Alan of Brittany (c. 1040 - 1093), Alan Rufus (or Alan the Red) was the second son of Odo, Count of Penthièvre. He was granted English lands which became known as the Honour of Richmond.
- Earl Hugh of Chester (c. 1047 - 1101) contributed 60 ships to the invasion of England, but did not fight at the Battle of Hastings.
- Count Robert of Mortain (c. 1031 - c. 1095) was the half-brother of William the Conqueror. He fought at the Battle of Hastings and as 2nd Earl of Cornwall he was one of the greatest landholders in England. He is seated next to King William on the Bayeux Tapestry.
- Archbishop of York
- Bishop of Lincoln
- Bishop of Bayeux
- Abbey of Burgh
- Roger de Busli (c. 1038 - c. 1099), granted 86 manors in Nottinghamshire, 46 in Yorkshire, and others in Derbyshire, Lincolnshire, Leicestershire and Devon. They became the Honour of Blyth (later renamed the Honour of Tickhill).
- William Peverel (c. 1040 - c. 1115), granted over a hundred manors in central England from the king, forming the Honour of Peverel, in Nottinghamshire and Derbyshire, including Nottingham Castle. He also built Peveril Castle at Castleton in Derbyshire.
- Walter D'Aincourt, was connected by marriage to William the Conqueror and was awarded over 70 manors in the East Midlands and Yorkshire.
- Geoffrey Alselin
- Ralph son of Hubert (FitzHubert), (1045 - 1086), son of Hubert de Corcun (Derei).
- Ralph de Limésy
- Ralph de Buron
- Roger de Poitou, his father Roger de Montgomery was one of William the Conqueror's main advisers.
- Gilbert de Gant (Ghent), (c. 1048 - 1095), was related to William the Conqueror's wife.
- Gilbert Tison, his lands were returned to the Crown by 1118 and given to the Houses of Romille, Percy, Fitz John and d'Aubigny.
- Geoffrey de la Guerche (c. 1040 - c. 1094), son of Silvestre who was lord of La Guerche and Pouence, near Rennes on the border of Brittany and Anjou.
- Ilbert de Lacy, son of Hugh de Lacy from Lassy, Calvados. He and his brother Walter left Normandy with William the Conqueror, who awarded them both lands. Ilbert's main lands were in west Yorkshire.
- Berengar de Tosny (c. 1050 - ?), eldest son of Robert de Todeni (founder of Belvoir Priory).
- Hugh fitzBaldrick was Sheriff of Yorkshire from 1069 to c. 1080. He gave some of his English lands to Préaux Abbey in Normandy and to St Mary's Abbey in York.
- Hugh de Grandmesnil (1032 - 1098), elder son of Robert I of Grandmesnil and he fought at the Battle of Hastings. He was granted 100 manors for his services, mostly in Leicestershire. He was appointed Sheriff of Leicestershire and Governor of Hampshire.
- Henry de Ferrers, served William the Conqueror and his successor King William II in administrative roles.
- Robert Malet (c. 1050 - 1100s), son of William Malet and he was High Sheriff of Norfolk and Suffolk from 1070 to 1080. He was a close advisor of King Henry I. He held over 200 manors in Suffolk.
- Durand Malet
- Osbern fitzRichard, son of Richard Scrob (founder of Richard's Castle in Herefordshire).
- Robert Curthose (c. 1051 - 1134), son of William the Conqueror and succeeded him as Duke of Normandy in 1087 AD.
- William the Usher
- King's Thanes

== See also ==
- Derbyshire Domesday Book tenants-in-chief
