= Robert Gradwell =

Catholic bishop

- Titular Bishop of Lydda
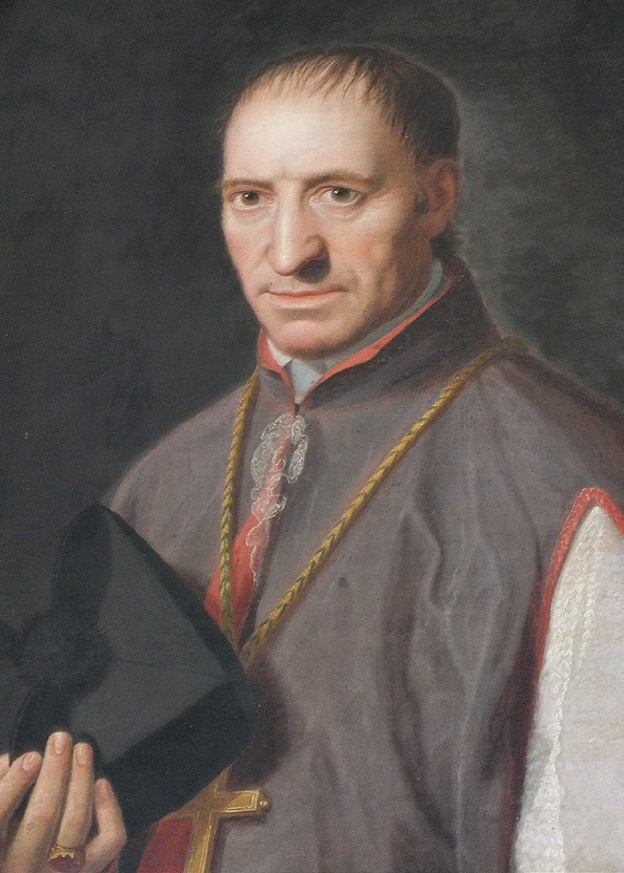
- A painting of Robert Gradwell made in 1860
- Church: Roman Catholic Church

Orders
- Ordination: December 1802
- Consecration: 1828

Personal details
- Born: 26 January 1777 Clifton-in-the Fylde, Lancashire
- Died: 15 March 1833 (aged 56) London

Robert Gradwell (26 January 1777 – 15 March 1833) was an English Catholic bishop, who served as rector of the English College in Rome. In 1828, he was appointed coadjutor to James Bramston, Vicar Apostolic of the London district.

== Life ==
Gradwell was born at Clifton-in-the Fylde, Lancashire, the third son of John and Margaret Gregson Gradwell. He went to the English College, Douai in 1791. The college being suppressed by the French revolutionists, he was confined for some time, and was not allowed to return to England till 1795. With most of the Douai refugees, he went to Crook Hall, Durham, where he was ordained priest in December 1802. He taught poetry and rhetoric for seven years at Crook Hall, and at Ushaw College. He left the college in July 1809 to go to Claughton, Wyre as assistant to the resident priest, who was in failing health. Gradwell succeeded him as missionary for the Chaughton District in February 1811 and remained there until September 1817.

About this time, Pope Pius VII decided to reopen the English College, Rome, and on John Lingard's recommendation, Gradwell was appointed rector (1818). Gradwell wrote a life of Lingard for the German edition of Lingard's History of England.

Under his administration the establishment flourished. He also acted as Roman agent for the English vicars Apostolic, exhibiting tact and diplomacy in this office. In 1821 the pope made him a doctor of divinity. In 1828 he was consecrated Bishop of Lydda, as coadjutor to James Bramston, the vicar Apostolic of the London district, and he came to London soon afterwards to take up his new duties. After some years of ill-health, he died of dropsy in London.

== Works ==
His writings include:

- "A dissertation of the Fable of Papal Antichrists" (London, 1816)
- "A Winter Evening Dialogue ... or, Thoughts on the Rule of Faith" (London, 1816)

Gradwell also wrote various journals, letters, and manuscripts in connexion with his residence in Rome. His notes on the old archives of the English College there are of historical interest. All of these documents are in the Westminster archdiocesan archives.
