= Listed buildings in Newton-with-Clifton =

Newton-with-Clifton is a civil parish in the Borough of Fylde, Lancashire, England. It contains 15 buildings that are recorded in the National Heritage List for England as designated listed buildings, all of which are listed at Grade II. This grade is the lowest of the three gradings given to listed buildings and is applied to "buildings of national importance and special interest". The parish contains the villages of Clifton, Dowbridge, Newton-with-Scales and Salwick, but is otherwise mainly rural. The Lancaster Canal passes through the parish, and there are nine listed buildings associated with it, eight bridges and a milestone. The other listed buildings are two cruck-framed cottages, a country house, two farmhouses, and a restored windmill.

== Buildings ==
Name and location	Photograph	Date	Notes
Newton Hall Farmhouse; 53.76956°N 2.83899°W	—	17th century	The farmhouse is in roughcast brick with a slate roof. It has two storeys and is in an L-shaped plan, with a front range of three bays and a rear wing. Th windows on the front are sashes, and those on the rear wing are sliding sashes. Inside much of the original timberwork remains, including a bressumer, beams, and timber-framed partitions.
Dagger Cottage; 53.76871°N 2.84206°W	—	1653	A cruck-framed cottage, in brick with a thatched roof. It has one storey with attics, and a three-bay front. On the front is a sliding sash window, there are two dormers in the roof, and casement windows at the rear. Inside the cottage are three full cruck trusses.
Canal bridge number 22; 53.77865°N 2.79268°W		c. 1797	The bridge carries Lea Lane over the Lancaster Canal. It is in sandstone and consists of a single elliptical arch, with triple keystones, bands, parapets with rounded coping, and pilastered ends.
Ward's House Bridge (number 23); 53.78006°N 2.79515°W		c. 1797	This is bridge number 23, an accommodation bridge over the Lancaster Canal, serving Ward's House. It is in sandstone and consists of a single elliptical arch, with triple keystones, bands, parapets with rounded coping, and pilastered ends. It has a humped deck, and on it are crudely inscribed initials.
Salwick Hall Bridge (number 24); 53.78388°N 2.81033°W		c. 1797	This is bridge number 24, an accommodation bridge over the Lancaster Canal, serving Salwick Hall. It is in sandstone and consists of a single elliptical arch, with triple keystones, bands, parapets with rounded coping, and pilastered ends.
Wilson's Bridge (number 25); 53.78475°N 2.81325°W		c. 1797	This is bridge number 25, an accommodation bridge over the Lancaster Canal, serving Salwick Hall. It is in sandstone and consists of a single elliptical arch, with triple keystones, bands, parapets with rounded coping, and pilastered ends.
Salwick Bridge (number 26); 53.79103°N 2.81453°W		c. 1797	This is bridge number 26, carrying Treales Road over the Lancaster Canal. It is in sandstone and consists of a single elliptical arch, with triple keystones, bands, parapets with rounded coping, and pilastered ends. This bridge has a flat deck.
Six Mile Bridge (number 27); 53.79399°N 2.81461°W		c. 1797	This is bridge number 27, an accommodation bridge over the Lancaster Canal. It is in sandstone and consists of a single elliptical arch, with triple keystones, bands, parapets with rounded coping, and pilastered ends.
New Bridge; 53.79806°N 2.81241°W		c. 1797	This is an accommodation bridge over the Lancaster Canal. It is not numbered, but in sequence is number 28. It is in sandstone and consists of a single elliptical arch, with quoins, single keystones, bands, parapets with rounded coping, and pilastered ends.
Kellet's Bridge (number 29); 53.80537°N 2.81262°W		c. 1797	This is bridge number 29, carrying Salwick Road over the Lancaster Canal. It is in sandstone and consists of a single elliptical arch, with triple keystones, bands, parapets with tubular iron railings, and pilastered ends.
Dixon's Farmhouse; 53.76865°N 2.84229°W	—	c. 1800	The former farmhouse is in brick with stone dressings and a slate roof. It has two storeys and three bays. The doorway has a large lintel set in a round-headed recess with a keystone and imposts. The windows are sashes.
Windmill Tavern; 53.77484°N 2.81409°W		c. 1800	After being disused for a time, the windmill has been restored and integrated into a public house. It is built in rendered brick, and consists of a circular tapering tower in four storeys and a basement. In the walls are a doorway and segmental-headed windows, at the top is a boat-shaped wooden cap.. The sails are missing.
Clifton Hall; 53.76685°N 2.80577°W	—	1832–33	A country house in Elizabethan style, later used as a nursing home. It is in red brick with sandstone dressings and a slate roof, and has two storeys. The house has a roughly U-shaped plan and is asymmetrical. Features include gables with finials, mullioned and transomed windows, tall octagonal chimneys, corner turrets, and corbelled pinnacles.
Milestone; 53.79387°N 2.81483°W	—	19th century (probable)	The milestone is beside the towpath of the Lancaster Canal, about 20 metres (66 ft) south of Six Miles Bridge. It consists of a slab about 1 metre (3 ft 3 in) high, and contains two oval plaques with the distances in miles to Preston and Garstang.
8 Grange Lane; 53.76921°N 2.84086°W	—	Undated	A cruck-framed cottage, formerly two cottages, in rendered brick with a thatched roof. It has one storey with attics, and is in a linear four-bay plan. On the front are three buttresses, a doorway, and casement windows. Inside there are three full cruck trusses.
