= Ralph Fitzhubert =

Norman magnate and administrator

Ralph Fitzhubert (1045 – 1086) was a Norman who after the 1066 Norman conquest was awarded extensive lands in England.

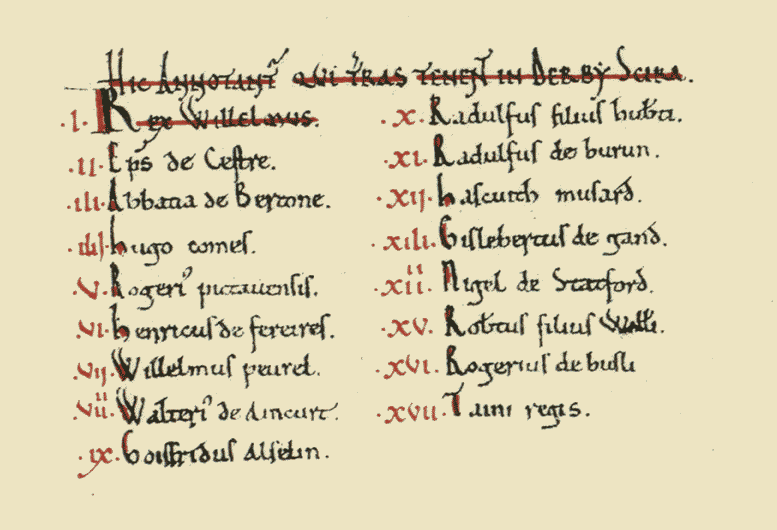
Fitzhuberts name listed in the Domesday Book of 1086 AD

== Lands ==
In the Domesday Book of 1086 AD, FitzHubert is listed amongst the Derbyshire Domesday Book tenants-in-chief as owning lands in: Ashover, Ballidon, Bamford, Barlborough, Barrow-upon-Trent, Beighton, Boulton, Clifton, Clowne, Crich, Duckmanton and Long Duckmanton, Eckington, Egstow, Harthill, Hathersage, Ingleby, Kirk Langley, Lea, Middle, Nether and West Handley, Mosborough, Nether and Upper Hurst, Newton, Offerton, Ogston, Palterton, Pentrich, Ripley, Scarcliffe, Shuckstone, Stoney Middleton, Stretton, Tansley, Tunstall, Ufton, Werredune, Wessington, Whitwell, Willington, and Wirksworth

== Family ==
Ralph was the son of Hubert de Corcun (Derei).
