= Clifton, Lancashire =

Village in Lancashire, England

Coordinates: 53.767°N 2.809°W

Clifton
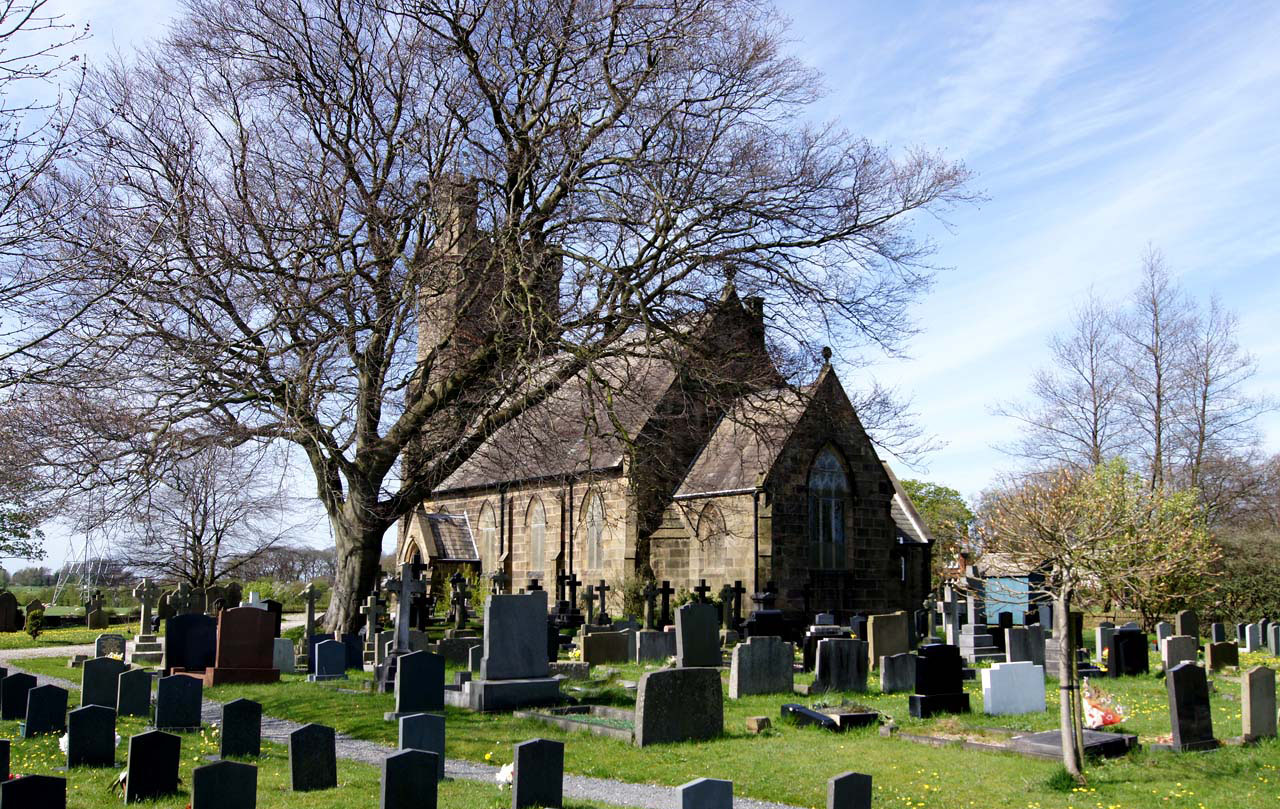
- St John the Evangelist's Church, Clifton

- Shown within Fylde Borough Shown within the Fylde Location within Lancashire
- OS grid reference: SD467303
- Civil parish: Newton-with-Clifton
- District: Fylde
- Shire county: Lancashire
- Region: North West
- Country: England
- Sovereign state: United Kingdom
- Post town: PRESTON
- Postcode district: PR4
- Dialling code: 01772
- Police: Lancashire
- Fire: Lancashire
- Ambulance: North West

Clifton is a village in the English county of Lancashire and in the district of Fylde. The village is part of the civil parish of Newton-with-Clifton. It is situated on the A583 road, approximately 5 miles (8.0 km) west of its post town, Preston, and 11 miles (18 km) east of Blackpool.

The village is also home to the church of St John the Evangelist, also known as Lund parish church, which is situated on Church Lane, and the Grade II listed Clifton Hall.

== Amenities ==
The village once had a Post Office and still has convenience store and a number of small businesses, including a garage. Near the village is a branch of Dobbies Garden Centre and a caravan and motor-home sales centre.

In December 2014 radio station CliftonFM made its inaugural broadcast. Highlights included Stereo Mathematics, Church Hall v Cathedral and an organ sing along. The station no longer broadcasts.

== Transport links ==
The nearest rail station is Salwick railway station, but this has only a limited service. A more comprehensive service is available from Kirkham and Wesham railway station provided by Northern.

The Blackpool to Preston No 61 bus service passes through Clifton.

== Nearby towns and villages ==
- Freckleton
- Kirkham
- Newton-with-Scales
- Preston
- Salwick
- Wrea Green

== Gallery ==
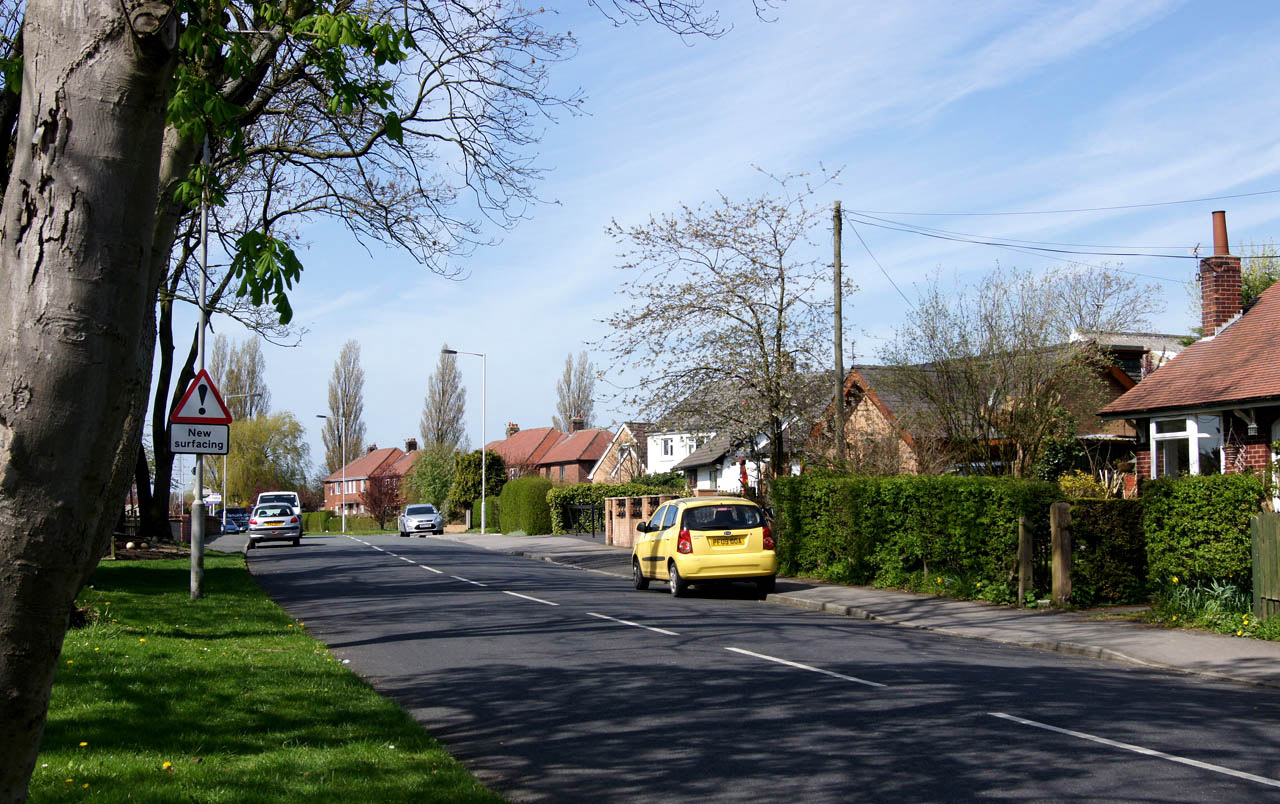
Clifton

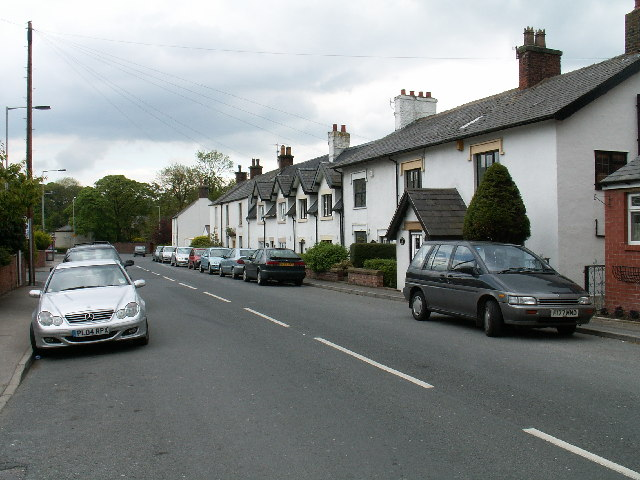
Houses in the village

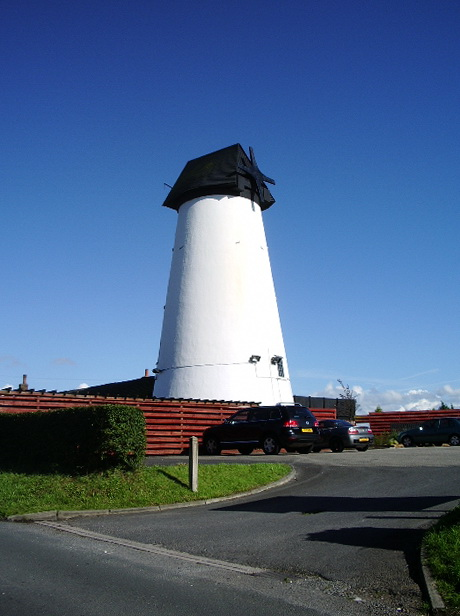
Windmill on Church Lane

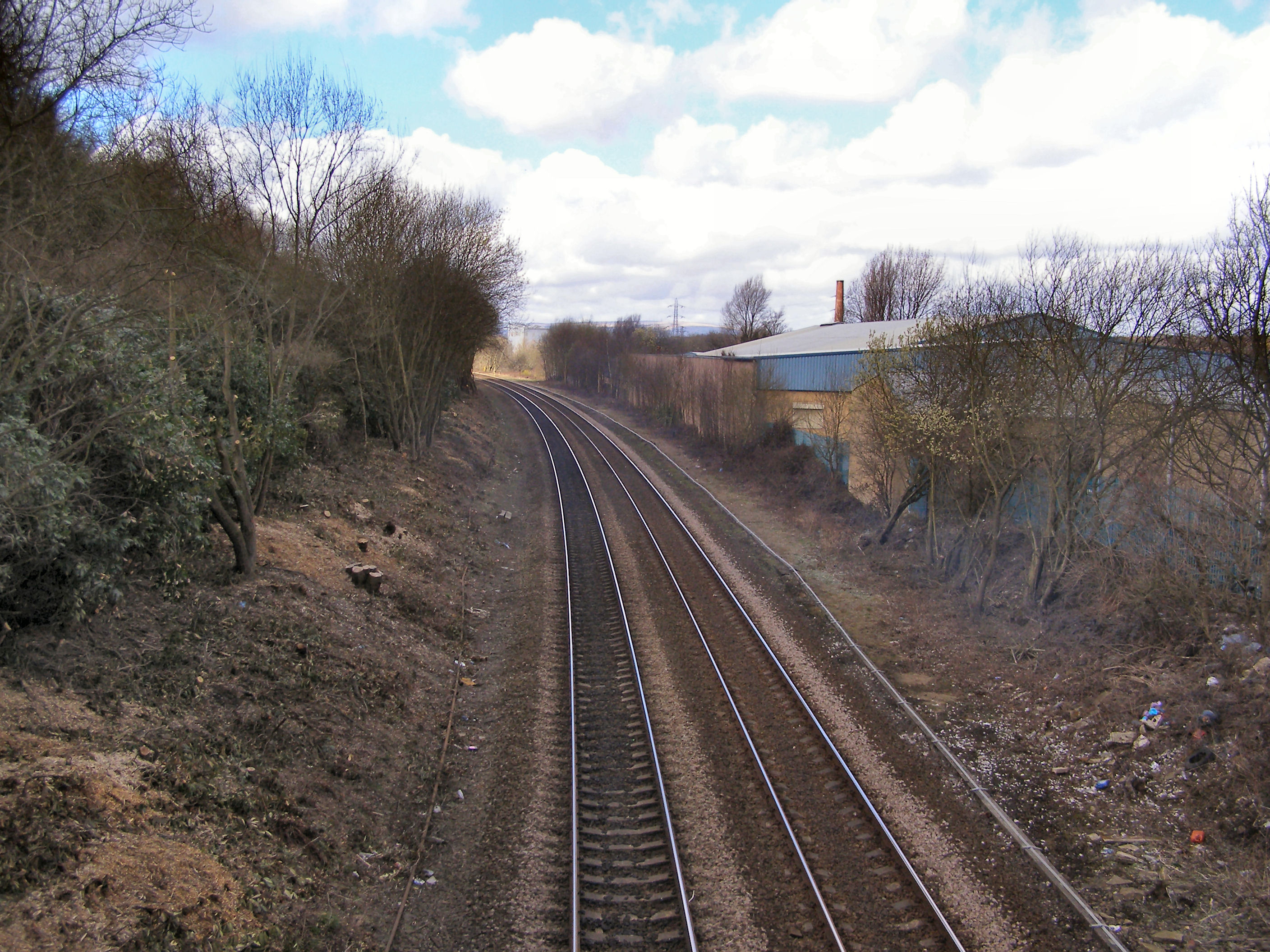
Railway at Clifton, looking north-west from Pepperhill Bridge

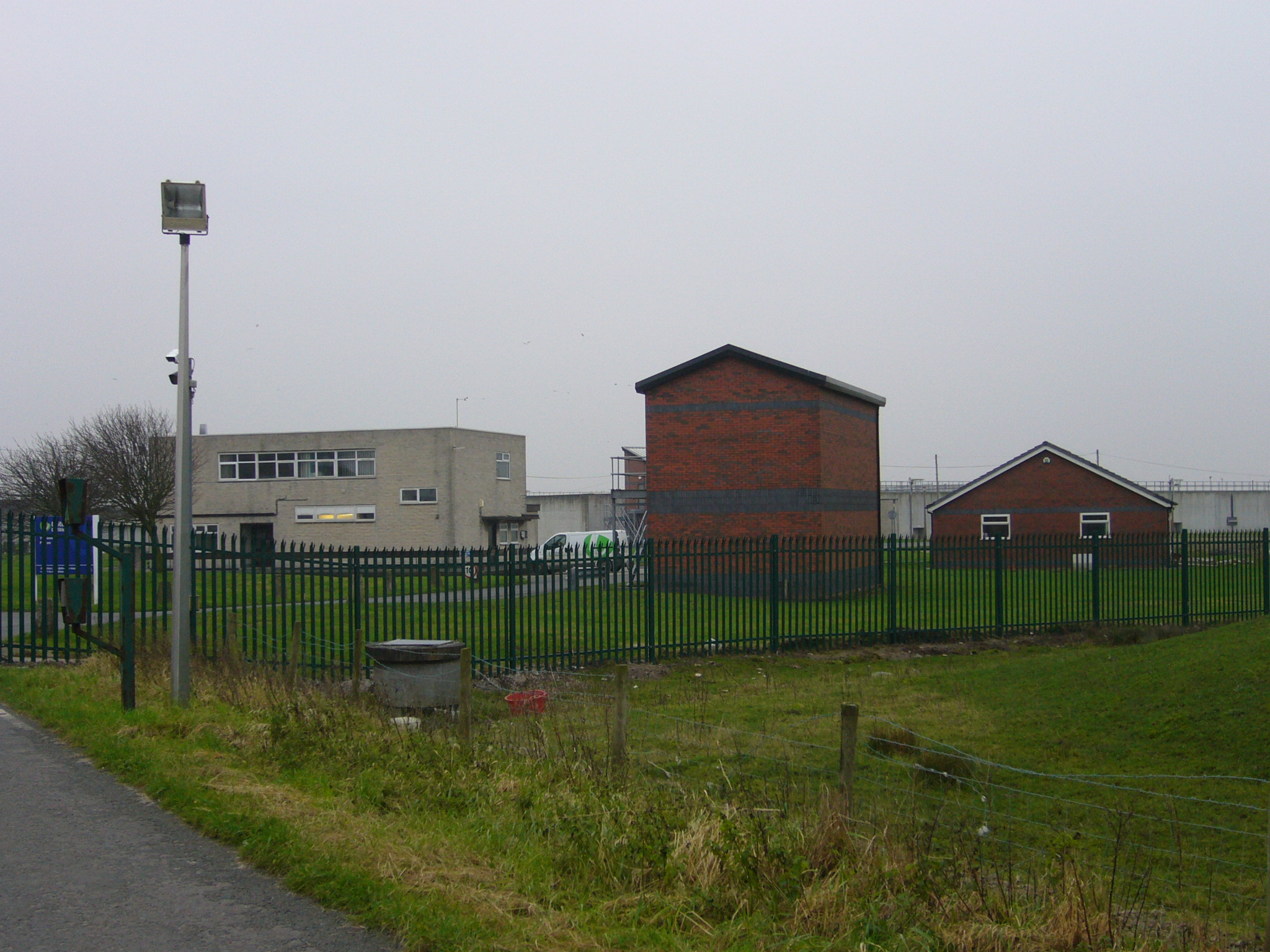
The wastewater from Preston is treated here in Clifton

== See also ==
- Listed buildings in Newton-with-Clifton
