= Salwick =

Village in Lancashire, England

Coordinates: 53.784°N 2.815°W

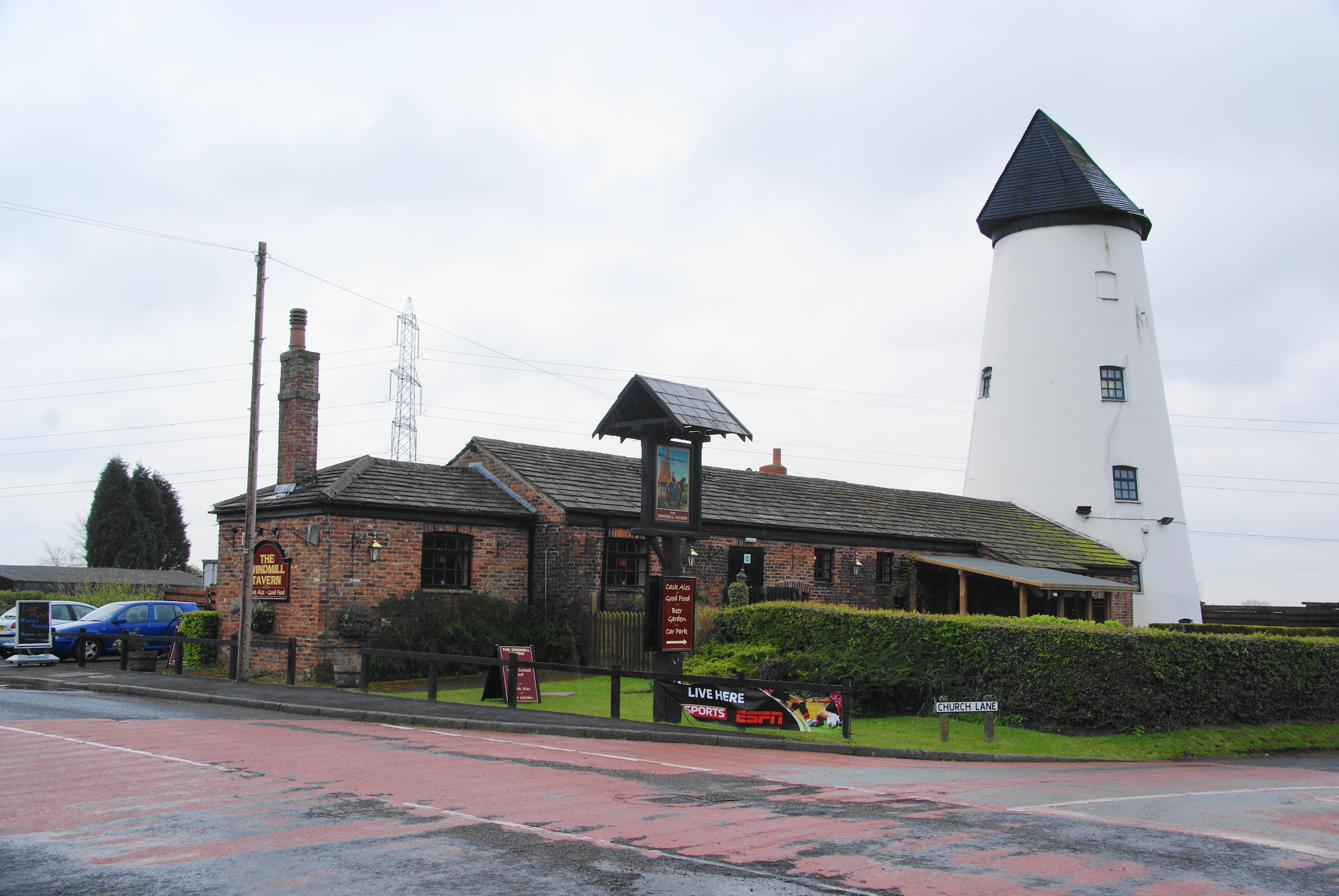
- Windmill Tavern public house, Salwick

- Shown within Fylde Borough Shown within the Fylde Location within Lancashire
- OS grid reference: SD463322
- Civil parish: Newton-with-Clifton
- District: Fylde
- Shire county: Lancashire
- Region: North West
- Country: England
- Sovereign state: United Kingdom
- Post town: PRESTON
- Postcode district: PR4
- Dialling code: 01772
- Police: Lancashire
- Fire: Lancashire
- Ambulance: North West
- UK Parliament: Fylde

Salwick is a village between Kirkham and Preston in Lancashire, England. The village is largely rural and is an extension of the smaller Clifton to the south. It is in the borough of Fylde, and in the Parliamentary Constituency of Fylde, and forms part of the civil parish of Newton-with-Clifton. It is at grid reference SD466320, and is served by Salwick railway station.

The area of "Clifton With Salwick" was in the Archdeaconry of Richmond in the Diocese of Chester.

The toponymy of Salwick is unclear. The "wick" may come from Old English wic, meaning an earlier Romano-British settlement specialised in farming; but the "Sal(w)" element is unclear.

Salwick is the home of the Springfields nuclear fuel manufacturing plant operated by Westinghouse Electric Company, which dominates the village.

In November 2021 a poultry farm near Salwick was the location for an outbreak of Bird Flu (Avian influenza H5N1). Temporary control zones spanning 3 km (1.9 mi) and 10 km (6.2 mi) around the property were set up, spanning from Blackpool to Fulwood.

The Hand and Dagger is a popular country pub, dating from about 1800, next to bridge 26 on the Lancaster Canal. The unusual name derives from the devices shown on the crest of the local Clifton family.

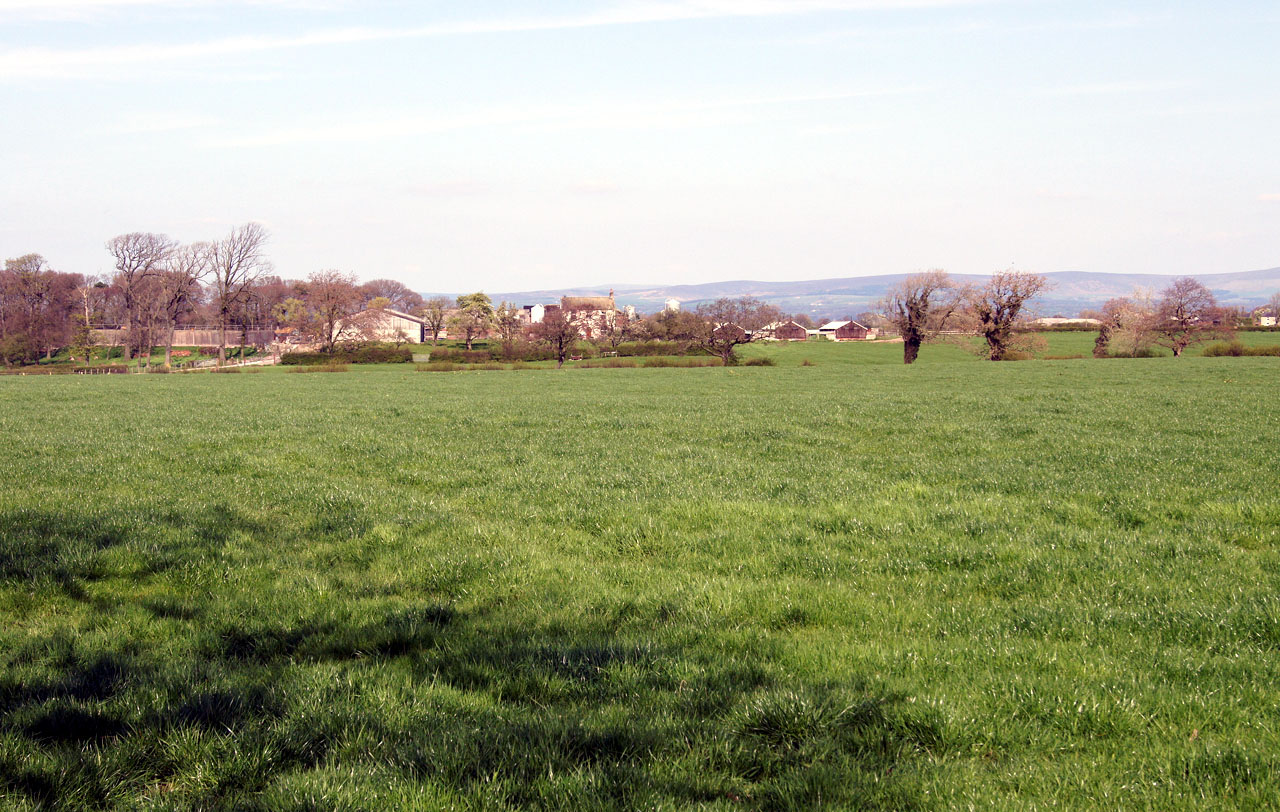
Rural view of Salwick

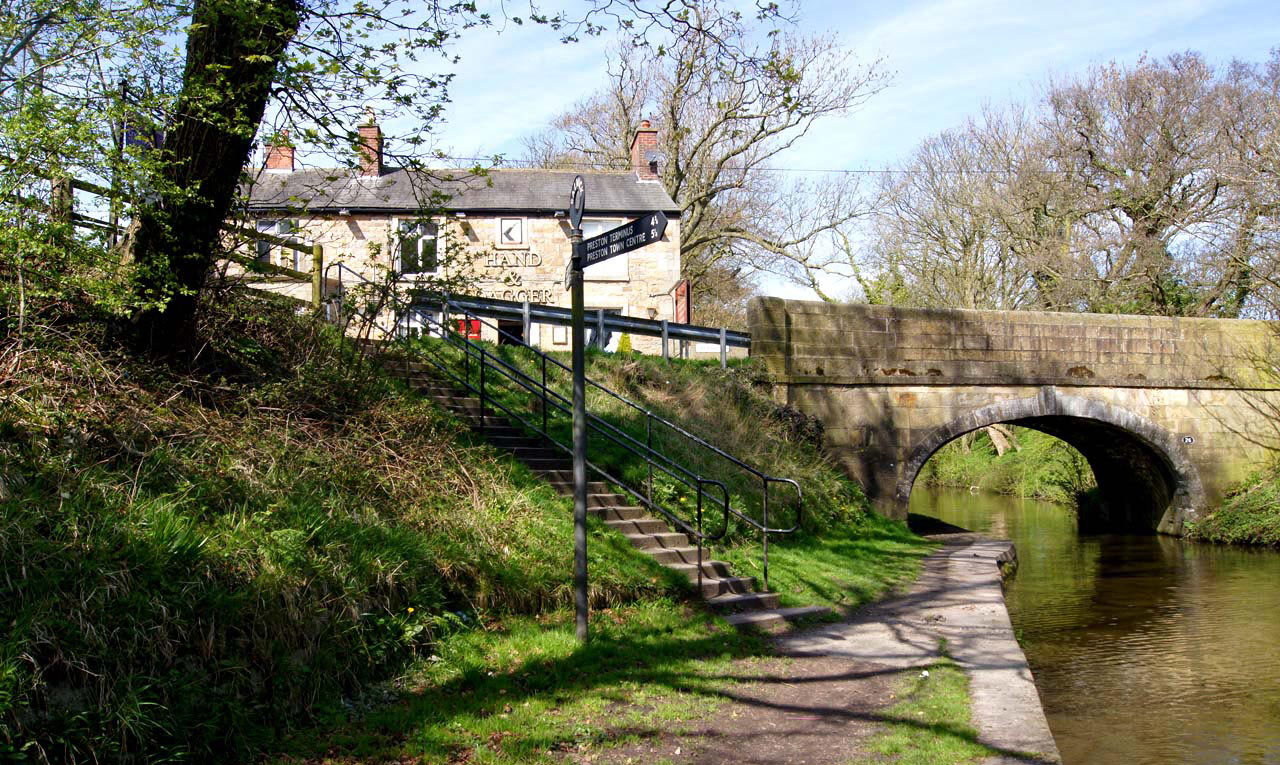
Hand and Dagger pub alongside the Lancaster Canal

== See also ==
- Listed buildings in Newton-with-Clifton
