= Springfields =

Nuclear site in Lancashire, England

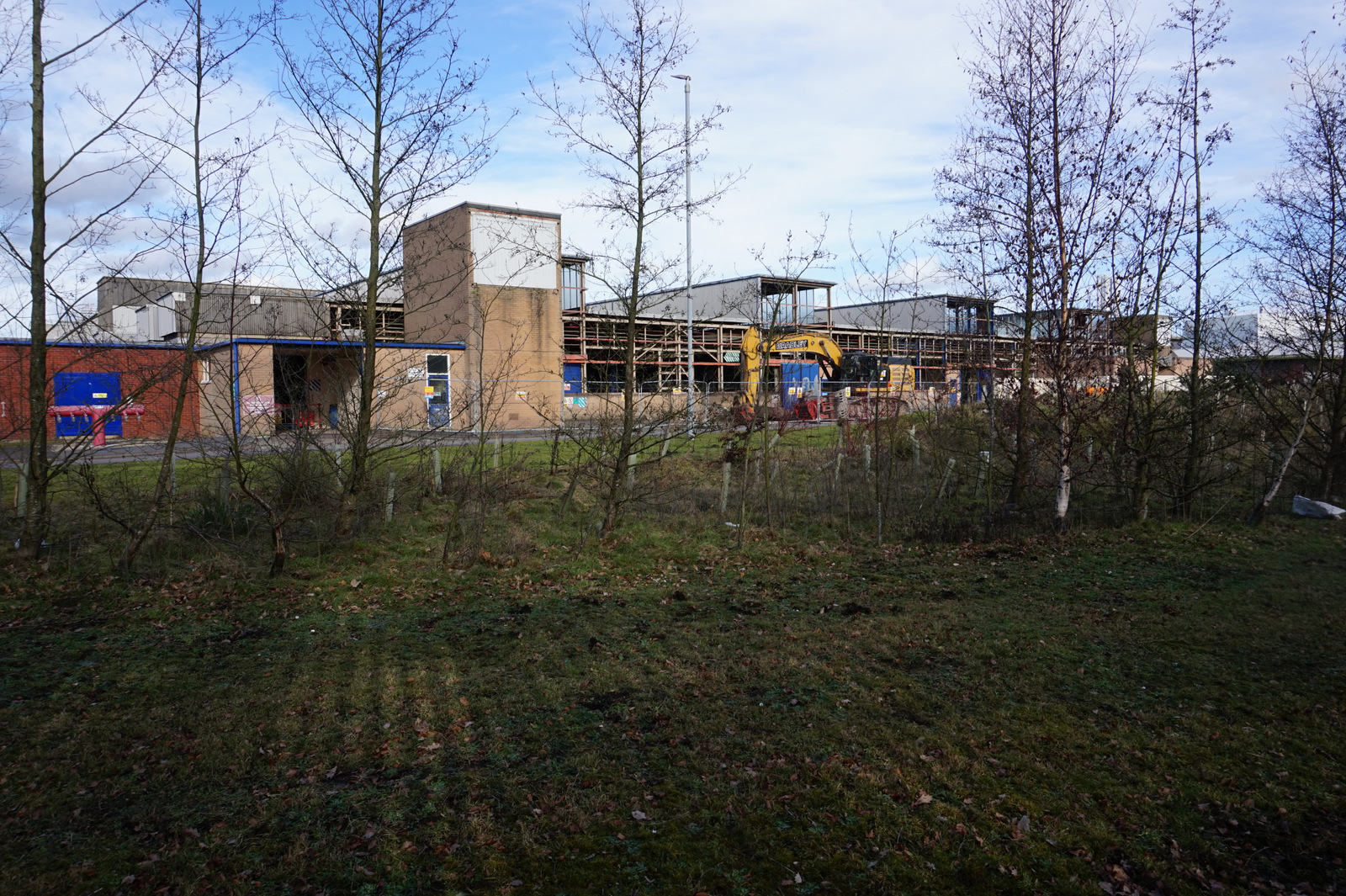
- View from Deepdale Lane

- Location within Lancashire
- Built: 1940 (as munitions factory); 1946 (as nuclear fuels facility)
- Location: Springfields Fuels Limited, Westinghouse, Springfields, Salwick, Preston PR4 0XJ; Salwick, Lancashire, England
- Coordinates: 53°46′39″N 2°48′29″W
- Industry: Nuclear fuel
- Products: oxide fuels; uranium hexafluoride
- Employees: 800

Springfields is a nuclear fuel production installation in Salwick, near Preston in Lancashire, England (grid reference SD468315). The site is currently operated by Springfields Fuels Limited, under the management of Westinghouse Electric UK Limited, on a 150-year lease from the Nuclear Decommissioning Authority. Since its conversion from a munitions factory in 1946, it has previously been operated and managed by a number of different organisations including the United Kingdom Atomic Energy Authority and British Nuclear Fuels. Fuel products are produced for the UK's nuclear power stations and for international customers.

== Activities on the site ==
The site has been making nuclear fuels since the mid-1940s. The site is notable for being the first nuclear plant in the world to produce Magnox fuel for a commercial power station (Calder Hall).

The four main activities carried out on the site are:

- Production of oxide fuels for advanced gas-cooled and light water reactors, as well as intermediate fuel products (uranium dioxide powders, granules, and pellets)
- Production of uranium hexafluoride, or "hex"
- Processing of fuel-cycle residues
- Decommissioning and demolition of redundant plants and buildings

At its peak the site employed 4000 people, but reduced demand and increased automation saw this fall to about 800 by 2020.

In December 2022 Westinghouse received a £13 million grant from the UK government to explore the development of Uranium Conversion Services at the site.

== Future of the plant ==
Decommissioning activities have so far resulted in 87 buildings on the site having been fully demolished. A Clean Energy Technology Park (CETP) has been set up to encourage new companies to operate on the site.
