= Preston, Lancashire =

City in Lancashire, England

Coordinates: 53.759°N 2.699°W

Preston
- City
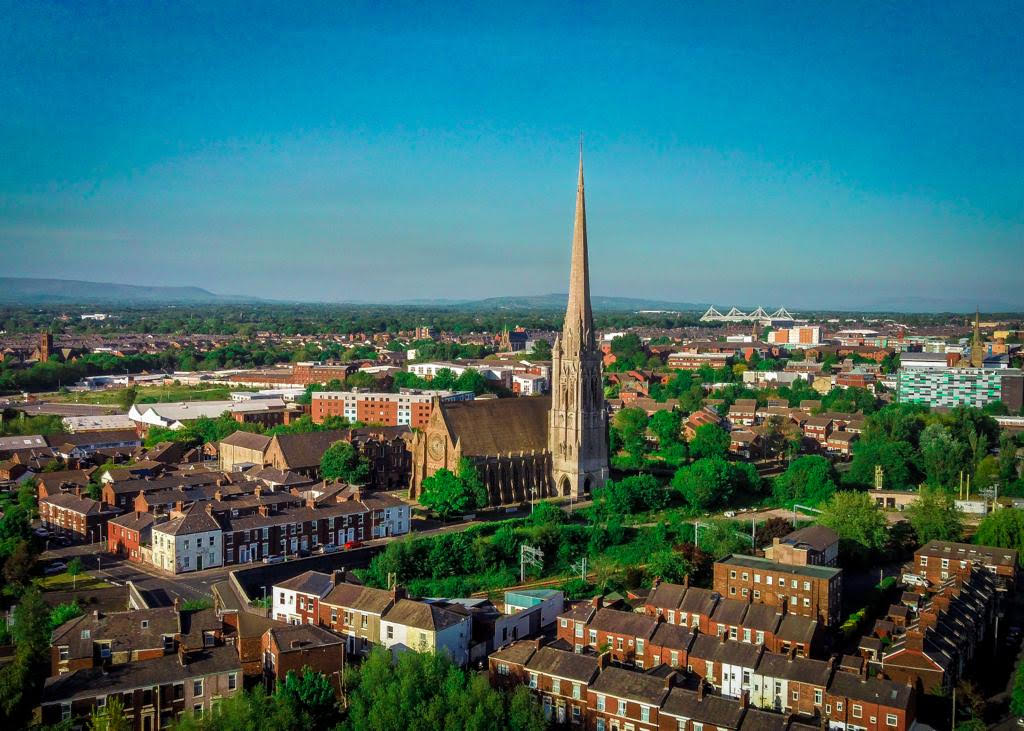
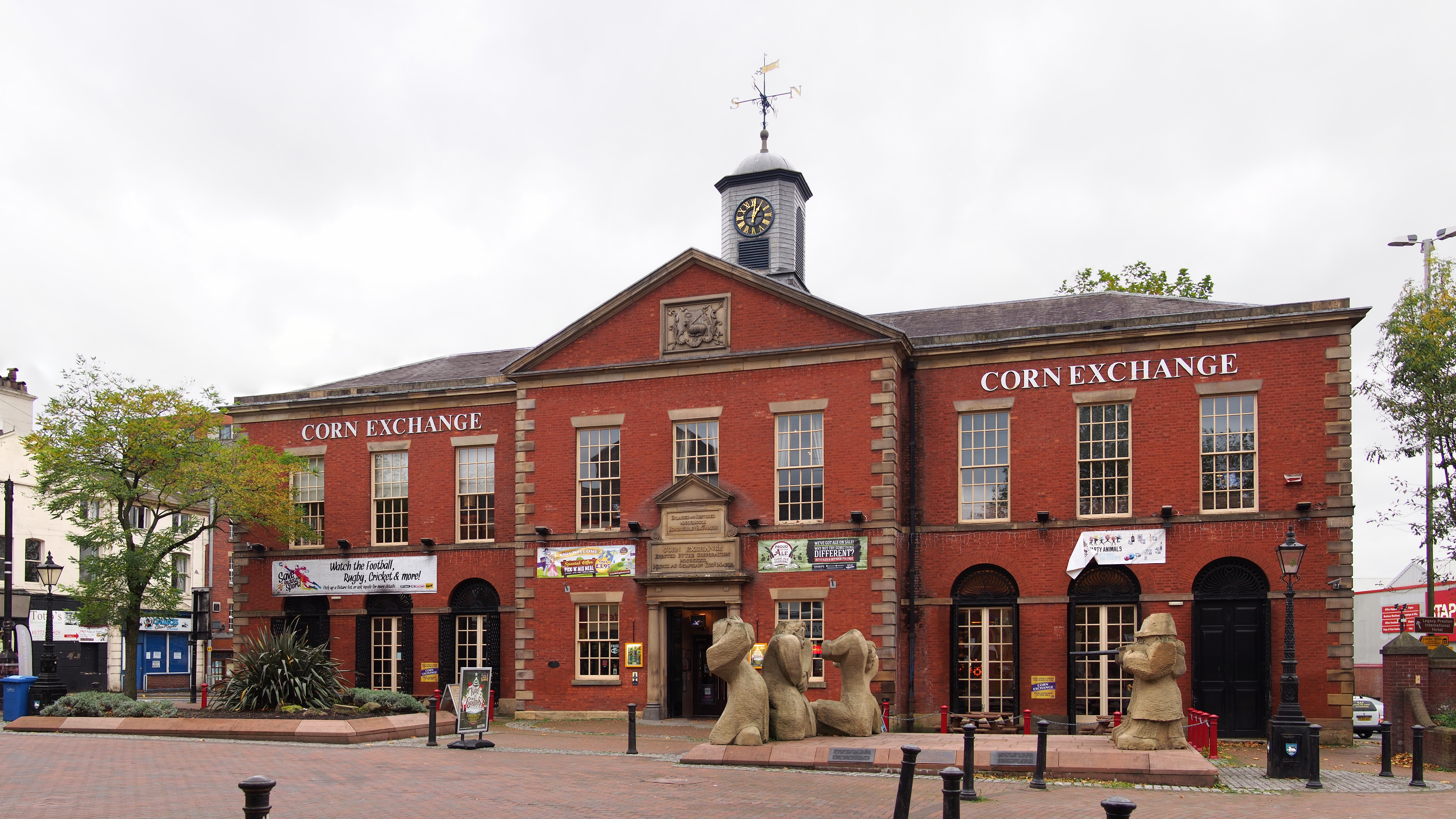
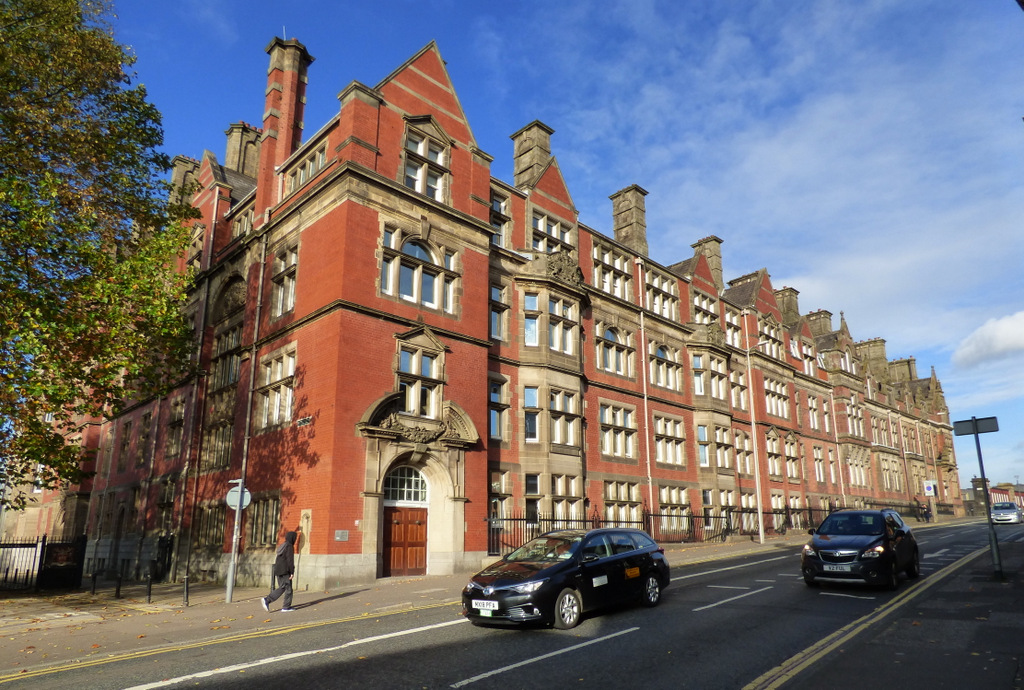
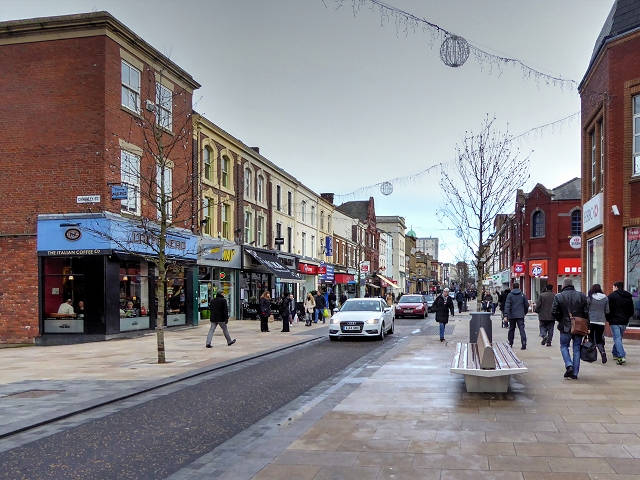
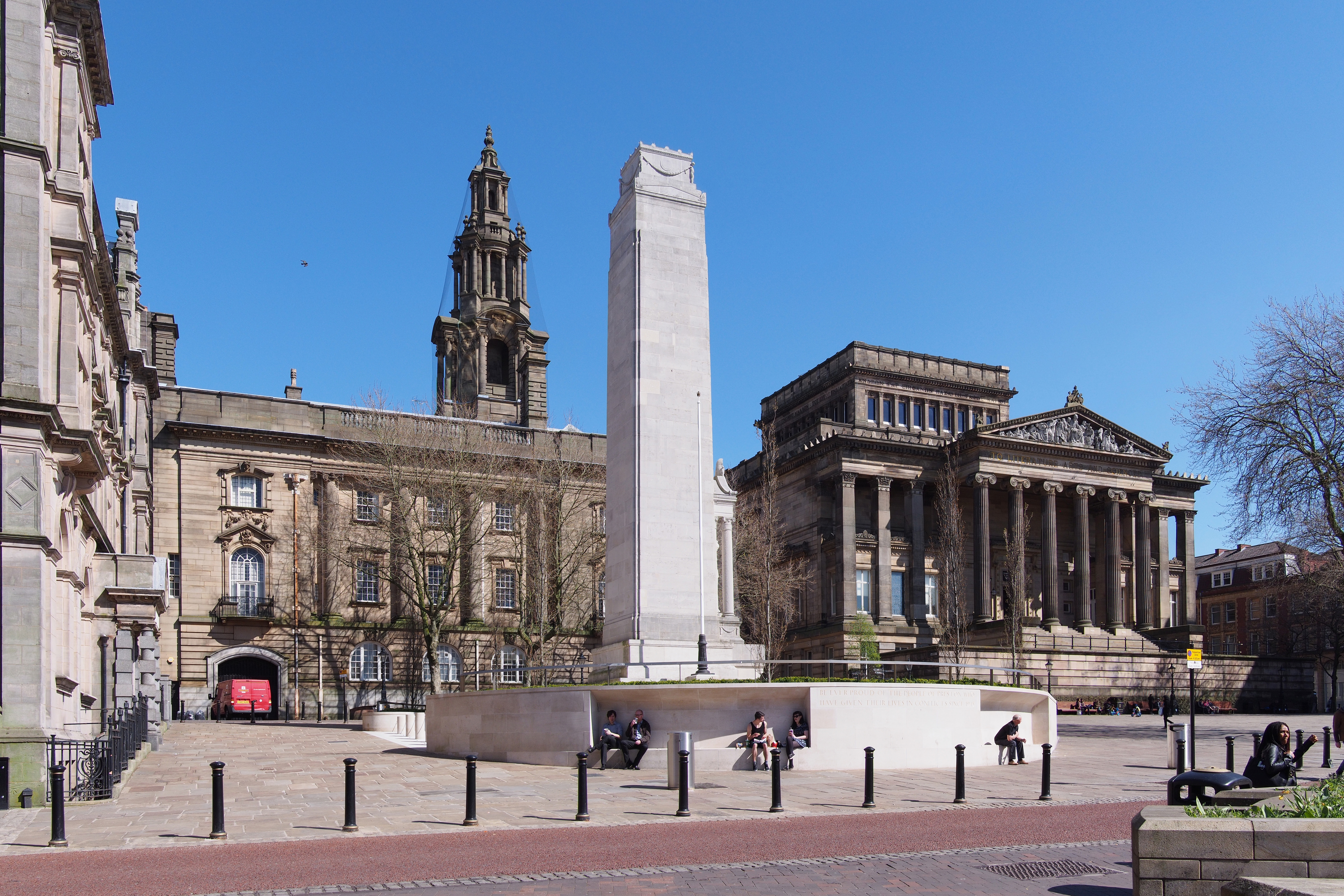
- St Walburge's Corn Exchange County Hall Fishergate Flag Market

- The city flag

- City centre in the City of Preston district City centre within Preston unparished area Location within Lancashire
- Population: 147,800 (2021)
- Demonym: Prestonian
- District: Preston
- Shire county: Lancashire
- Region: North West
- Country: England
- Sovereign state: United Kingdom
- Post town: PRESTON
- Postcode district: PR1-PR2
- Dialling code: 01772
- Police: Lancashire
- Fire: Lancashire
- Ambulance: North West
- UK Parliament: Preston; Ribble Valley

Preston (/ˈprɛstən/) is a city on the north bank of the River Ribble in Lancashire, England. The city is the administrative centre of the county of Lancashire and the wider City of Preston local government district. Preston and its surrounding district obtained city status in 2002, becoming England's 50th city in the 50th year of Queen Elizabeth II's reign. Preston had a population of 147,835 at the 2021 census, the City of Preston district 156,411 in 2023 and the Preston Built-up Area 313,322. The Preston Travel To Work Area had a population of 420,661 in 2011, compared with 354,000 at the previous census. The south bank of the Ribble is part of the Preston urban area, although it forms the South Ribble borough that is administratively separate.

Preston and its surrounding area have provided evidence of ancient Roman activity, largely in the form of a Roman road that led to a camp at Walton-le-Dale. The Angles established Preston; its name is derived from the Old English meaning "priest's settlement" and in the Domesday Book is recorded as "Prestune". In the Middle Ages, Preston was a parish and township in the hundred of Amounderness and was granted a Guild Merchant charter in 1179, giving it the status of a market town. Textiles have been produced since the mid-13th century when locally produced wool was woven in people's houses. Flemish weavers who settled in the area in the 14th century helped develop the industry.

In the early-18th century, Edmund Calamy described Preston as "a pretty town with an abundance of gentry in it, commonly called Proud Preston". Sir Richard Arkwright, inventor of the spinning frame, was born in the town. The most rapid period of growth and development coincided with the industrialisation and expansion of textile manufacturing. Preston was a boomtown of the Industrial Revolution, becoming a densely populated engineering centre, with large industrial plants. The town's textile sector fell into terminal decline from the mid-20th century and Preston has subsequently faced similar challenges to other post-industrial northern towns, including deindustrialisation, economic deprivation and housing issues. In the 21st century, tertiary education and the defence industry have been major employment sectors.

The demonym for residents of the city is "Prestonian". Preston is the seat of both Lancashire County Council and Preston City Council, it houses the main campus of the University of Lancashire and is home to Preston North End F.C..

== Toponymy ==
Preston was recorded in the Domesday Book of 1086 as Prestune. Various other spellings occur in early documents: Prestonam (1094), Prestone (1160), Prestona (1160), Presteton (1180) and Prestun (1226). The modern spelling occurs in 1094, 1176, 1196, 1212 and 1332. The town's name is derived from the Old English words Presta and tun. The tun (enclosure, farmstead, village, manor, estate) of the Presta.

== History ==
=== Early development ===
During the Roman period, Roman roads passed close to what is now the centre of Preston. For example, the road from Luguvalium to Mamucium (now Carlisle to Manchester) crossed the River Ribble at Walton-le-Dale, 3/4 mile (1 km) south-east of the centre of Preston, and a Roman camp or station may also have been here. At Withy Trees, 1 1/2 miles (2 km) north of Preston, the road crossed another Roman road from Bremetennacum (the Roman fort at Ribchester) to the coast.

An explanation of the origin of the name is that the Priest's Town refers to a priory set up by St Wilfrid near the Ribble's lowest ford. This idea is supported by the similarity of the Paschal lamb on Preston's crest with that on St Wilfrid's.

When first mentioned in the 1086 Domesday Book, Preston was already the most important town in Amounderness (the area of Central Lancashire between the rivers Ribble and Cocker, including The Fylde and the Forest of Bowland). When assessed for tax purposes in 1218–19, it was the wealthiest town in the county.

=== Guild Merchant ===
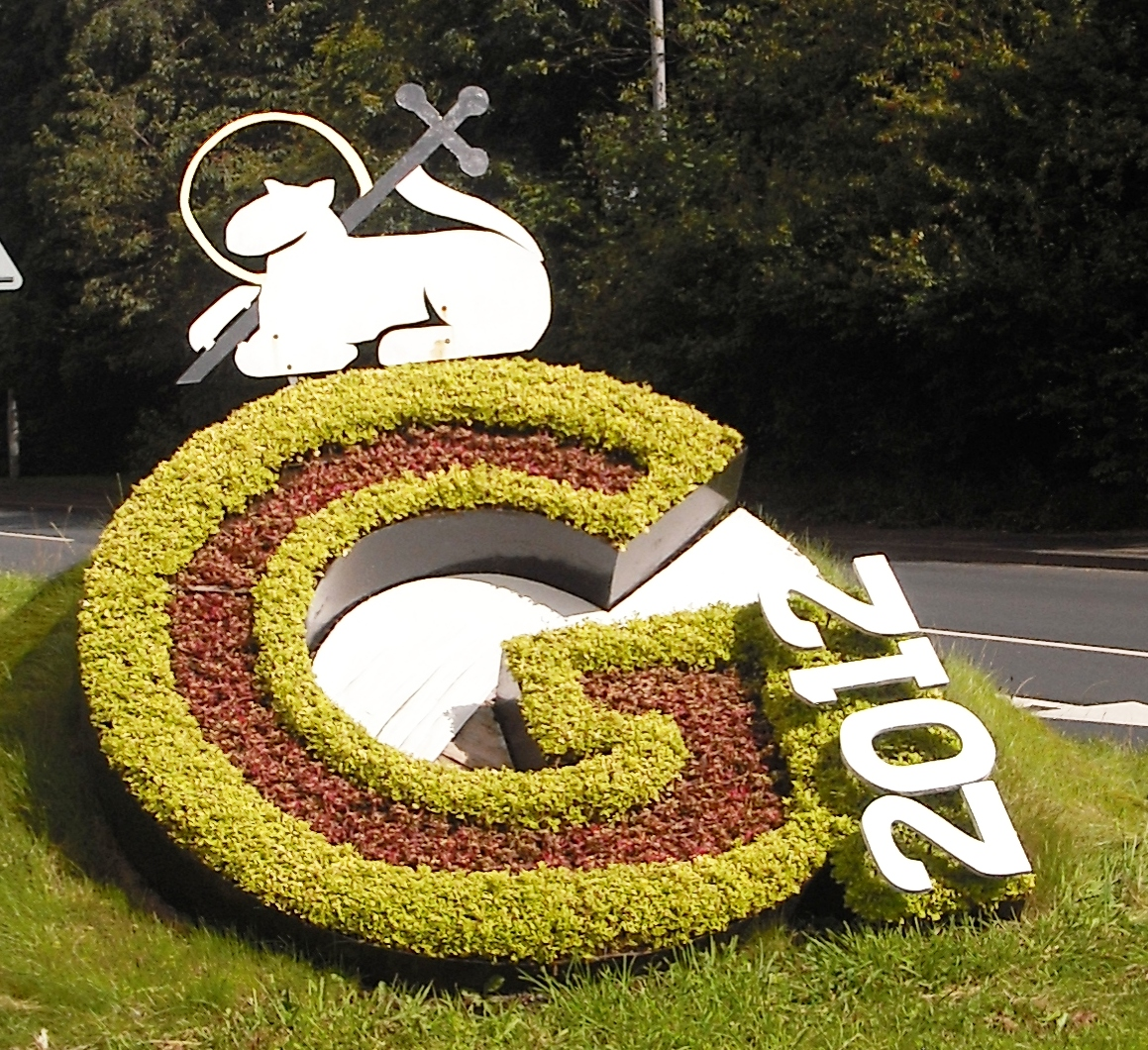
2012 Preston Guild roadside emblem

The right to hold a Guild Merchant was conferred by King Henry II upon the burgesses of Preston in a charter of 1179; the associated Preston Guild is a civic celebration held every 20 years, the last being in 2012. It is the only guild still celebrated in the UK.

Before 1328, celebrations were held at irregular intervals, but at the guild of that year it was decreed that subsequent guilds should be held every 20 years. After this, there were breaks in the pattern for various reasons, but an unbroken series were held from 1542 to 1922. A full 400-year sequence was frustrated by the cancellation of the 1942 guild due to World War II, but the cycle resumed in 1952. The expression "(Once) every Preston Guild", meaning 'very infrequently', has passed into fairly common use, especially in Lancashire.

Guild week is always started by the opening of the Guild Court, which since the 16th century has traditionally been on the first Monday after the feast of the Beheading of John the Baptist celebrated on 29 August. As well as concerts and other exhibitions, the main events are a series of processions through the city. Numerous street parties are held in the locality.

In 1952, the emphasis was on the bright new world emerging after the war. The major event, held in the city's Avenham Park, had every school participating, and hundreds of children, from toddlers to teenagers, demonstrated different aspects of physical education in the natural amphitheatre of the park.

The 2012 guild formally opened on 2 September, with a mayoral proclamation and the return of "friendship scrolls" that had travelled the world. Highlights in the programme for the 2012 celebration included two concerts in Avenham Park – one by Human League and another, a "Proms In The Park", featuring José Carreras, Katherine Jenkins and the Manchester Camerata.

=== Pre-industrial ===
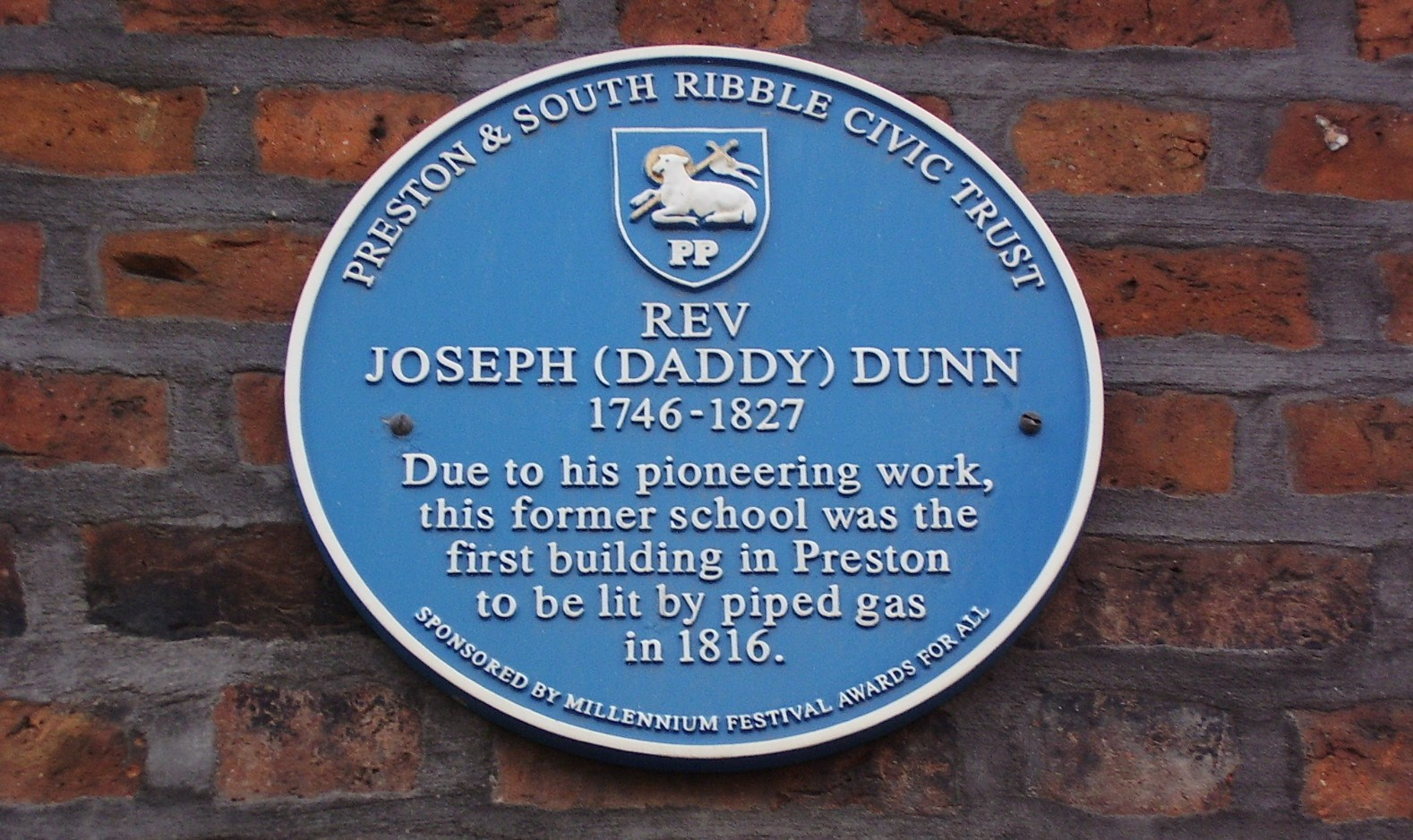
Plaque in Fox Street commemorating the work of Reverend Joseph Dunn in bringing gas lighting to the town

In the mid-12th century, Preston was in the hundred of Amounderness, in the deanery of Amounderness and the archdeaconry of Richmond. The name "Amounderness" is more ancient than the name of any other "Wapentake" or hundred in the County of Lancashire, and the fort at Tulketh, strengthened by William the Conqueror, shows that the strategic importance of the area was appreciated even then.

The location of the city, almost exactly midway between Glasgow and London, led to many confrontations with Scotland. Preston was burned by the Scots during The Great Raid of 1322 but two years later had quickly recovered. Decisive battles were also fought here, most notably during the English Civil War at the Battle of Preston (1648), and then the first Jacobite rebellion, whose invasion of England was brought to a conclusion by the defeat of the pro-Catholic and pro-monarchial Jacobite army at the Battle of Preston (1715). Letitia Elizabeth Landon alludes to this latter defeat in her poetical illustration, Preston, to an engraving of a painting by Thomas Allom, in Fisher's Drawing Room Scrap Book 1834.

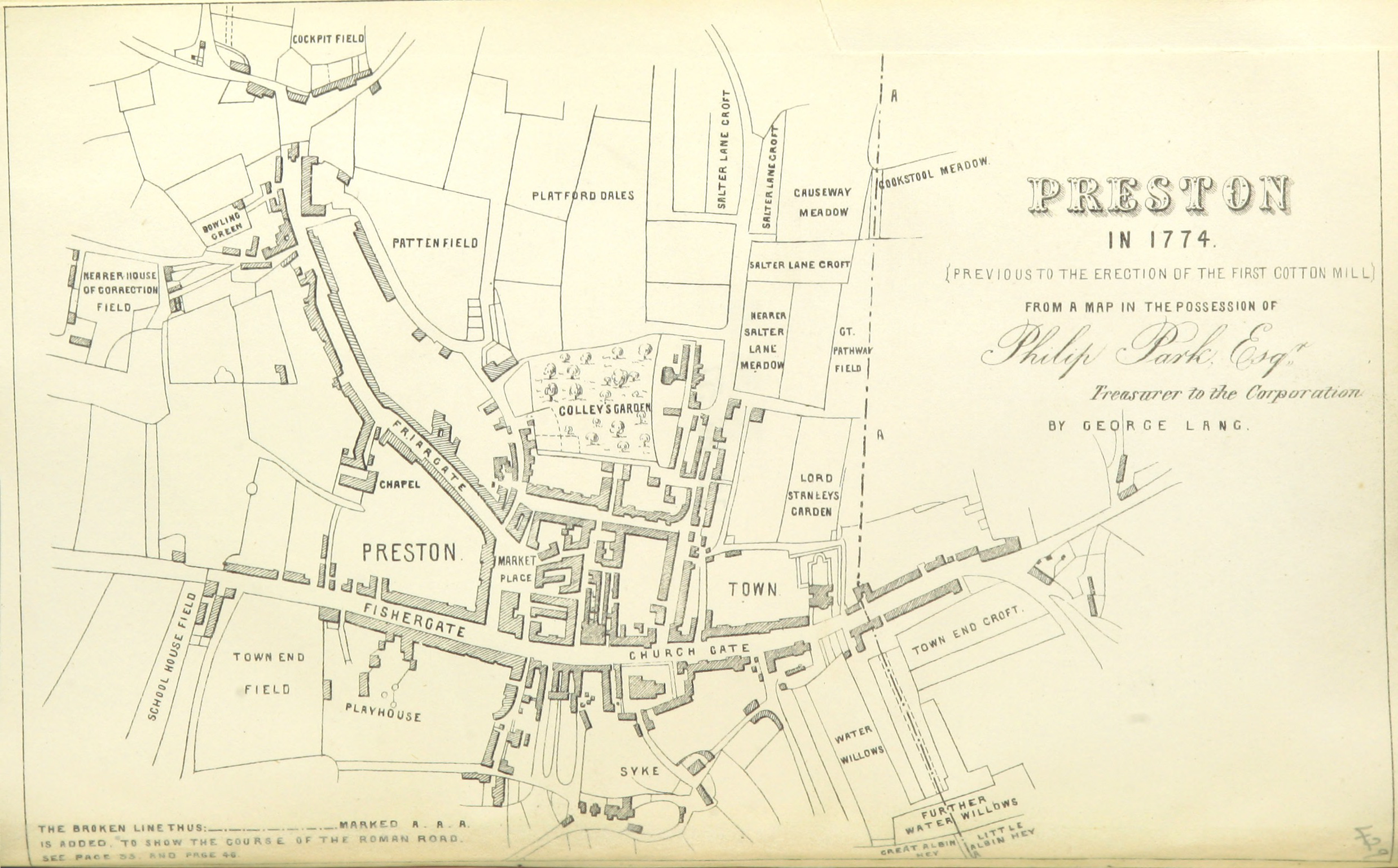
Preston in 1774

In the last great Jacobite Rising, on 27 November 1745 the Jacobite Prince of Wales and Regent, Bonnie Prince Charlie passed through Preston with his Highland Army on the way south through Chorley and Manchester to Derby intending to take London and the Crown. Preston was the first of quite a few places in England where the Prince was cheered as he rode by and where he was joined by some English volunteers for his Army. One Jacobite eyewitness noted that from Preston onwards, "at every town we were received with ringing of bells, and at night we have bonfires, and illuminations". Another Jacobite eyewitness noted in a private letter from Preston on 27 November 1745: "People here are beginning to join [us] very fast; we have got about sixty recruits today". From 10 to 12 December the Prince gave his retreating Army a rest in Preston on their long, last and fatal retreat from Derby through Lancaster and Carlisle to their dreadful day of destiny the following 16 April on Culloden Moor, near Inverness.

=== Industrial Revolution ===
Merchants from Preston took part in the transatlantic slave trade in the 18th century.

The 19th century saw a transformation in Preston from a small market town to a much larger industrial one. The innovations of the latter half of the previous century, such as Richard Arkwright's water frame (invented in Preston), brought cotton mills to many northern English towns. With industrialisation came examples of both oppression and enlightenment.

Preston was the first English town outside London to be lit by gas. The Preston Gas Company was established in 1815 by, amongst others, a Catholic priest: Rev. Joseph "Daddy" Dunn of the Society of Jesus. The Preston and Wigan Railway arrived in 1838, shortly afterwards renamed the North Union Railway. The Sheffield firm of Thos. W. Ward Ltd opened a ship breaking yard at Preston Dock in 1894.

The more oppressive side of industrialisation was seen during the Preston Strike of 1842 on Saturday 13 August 1842, when a group of cotton workers demonstrated against the poor conditions in the town's mills. The Riot Act was read and armed troops corralled the demonstrators in front of the Corn Exchange on Lune Street. Shots were fired and four of the demonstrators were killed. A commemorative sculpture now stands on the spot (although the soldiers and demonstrators represented are facing the wrong way). In the 1850s, Karl Marx visited Preston and later described the town as "the next St Petersburg". Charles Dickens visited Preston in January 1854 during a strike by cotton workers that had by that stage lasted for 23 weeks. It is believed that the town of "Coketown" in the novel Hard Times was inspired by this visit to Preston. In 1858, the Preston Power Loom Weavers' Association was founded, and by 1920 it had more than 13,000 members in the town.

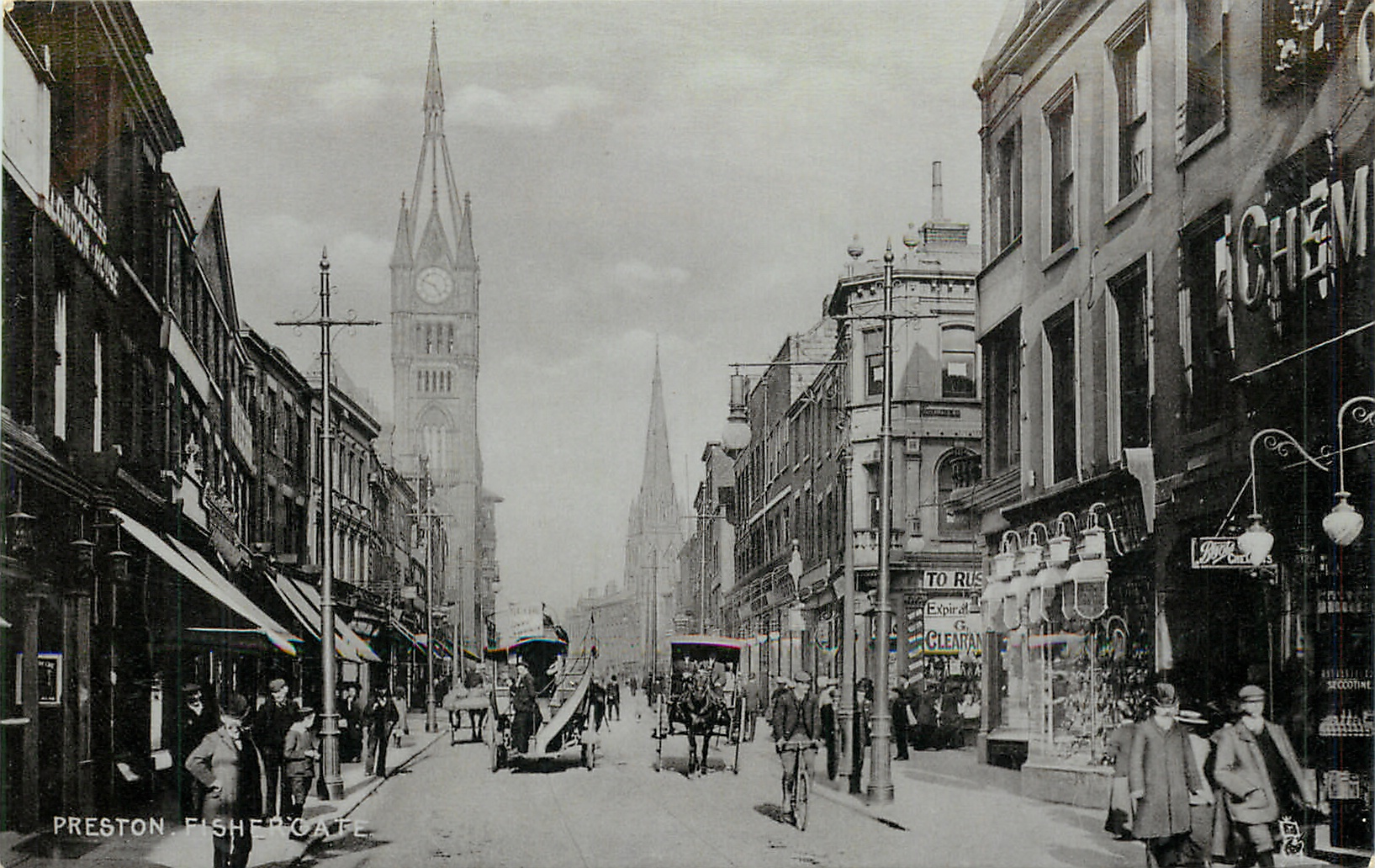
Fishergate and the Town Hall clock tower in about 1904

The Preston Temperance Society, led by Joseph Livesey pioneered the Temperance Movement in the 19th century. Indeed, the term teetotalism is believed to have been coined at one of its meetings. The website of the University of Central Lancashire library has a great deal of information on Joseph Livesey and the Temperance Movement in Preston.

Preston was one of only a few industrial towns in Lancashire to have a functioning corporation (local council) in 1835 (its charter dating to 1685), and was reformed as a municipal borough by the Municipal Corporations Act 1835. It became the County Borough of Preston under the Local Government Act 1888. In 1974, county boroughs were abolished, and it became part of the larger part of the new non-metropolitan district, the Borough of Preston, which also included Fulwood Urban District and much of Preston Rural District. The borough acquired city status in 2002.

=== 20th and 21st centuries ===
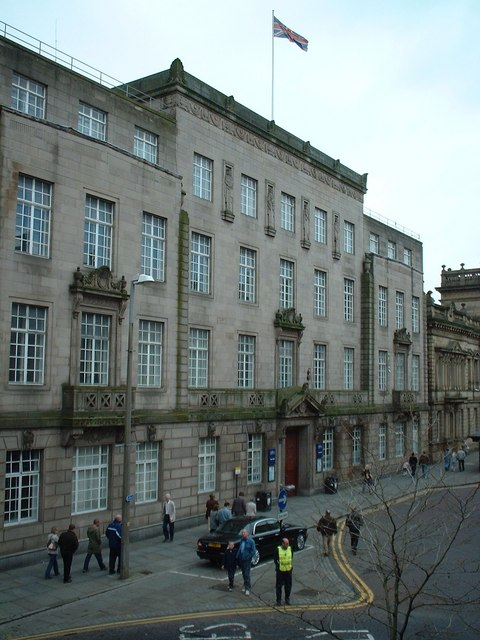
Preston Town Hall was completed in 1934

By 1901, nearly 120,000 people were living in Preston, which was now a booming industrial town. New industries arrived in Preston during the inter-war years which helped ease the pain felt through the sharp decline of the cotton industry. Electrical goods manufacturing and engineering arrived in the town, and the building sector enjoyed a boom with nearly 3,000 council houses being built between 1920 and 1939; around 1,500 houses were built for private sale.

Despite its heavy industry, Preston endured only a handful of Luftwaffe air raids in World War II and there were no fatalities in the town; however, an air crash in the Freckleton district claimed the lives of 61 people in 1944.

For some 20 years after 1948, Preston became home to a significant number of Asian and Caribbean Commonwealth immigrants, who mostly worked in the manufacturing industry. However, an economic decline hit the town once again in the 1970s, capped by the closure of the Courtaulds factory in 1979 (nearly 3,000 job losses) and the decline of the docks on the River Ribble, which finally closed in 1981. Mass unemployment was firmly back in Preston by the early 1980s, although it was now very much a national crisis due to the recession of that time.

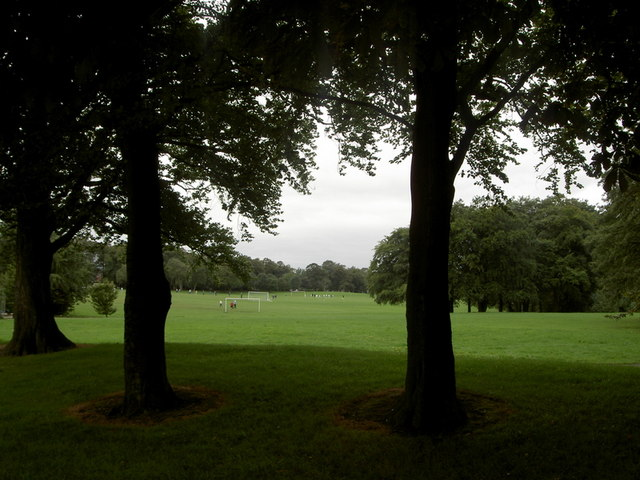
Moor Park

The rehousing of families from town centre slums to new council houses continued after World War II, though it slowed down to a virtual standstill after 1975. The face of the town centre began to change in the 1960s, with old developments being bulldozed and replaced by modern developments such as the St George's Shopping Centre, which opened in 1966, and the Fishergate Shopping Centre which was built nearly 20 years later. The remains of the Victorian town hall, designed by George Gilbert Scott and mostly destroyed by fire in 1947, were replaced by an office block (Crystal House) in 1962, and a modern-architecture Guild Hall opened in 1973, to replace the Public Hall.

The town was by-passed by Britain's very first motorway, built and operated by engineer James Drake, which was opened by prime minister Harold Macmillan in December 1958. Within a decade, this formed part of the M6; it gave Preston a direct motorway link with Birmingham. Completion of the M61, shortly thereafter, gave the town a direct link to Manchester. The late 1960s saw the completion of Ringway, a bypass around the town centre, as well as a new bus station.

On 6 April 2012, the city's residents performed the Preston Passion, a dramatised version of the Passion of Christ, which was broadcast live by BBC One.

=== Former railways ===
Although Preston is now only served by its main railway station, there were a number of others in the preceding decades, which have since closed, with many demolished. The following is a list of former stations within the boundaries of the current City of Preston:

- Barton & Broughton
- Butler Street (goods only)
- Deepdale (Bridge)
- Deepdale Street
- Fishergate Hill
- Grimsargh
- Grimsargh WHR (a separate station for the Whittingham Hospital railway)
- Lea Road
- Maudland Bridge
- Maudlands
- Maxwell House
- Oxheys (goods only, serviced Oxheys Cattle Market)
- Ribbleton
- Whittingham Hospital.

With the industrialisation of the town in the 19th century, the Preston Dock branch line was built in 1846 from Preston's mail station to carry goods to and from Victoria Quay on the River Ribble. With the opening of the Albert Edward Basin and the new Preston Dock in 1892, the number and length of tracks increased and at their peak grew to over 25 miles.

The lines to Southport and Longridge closed to passengers in 1965 and 1930 respectively. The disused tracks of the Longridge line are extant as far as Deepdale. In 2010, plans were put forward to use part of this line for a demonstration tram system.

With the closure of the docks in 1981 and its subsequent redevelopment, most of the tracks were removed and now only a small section remains, used by the Ribble Steam Railway (RSR) and for bitumen trains operating to the Total refinery at the Riversway industrial park.

A single station, Preston Riverside, is operated by the RSR for its heritage railway trips.

== Governance ==
The unparished urban settlement of Preston is represented by 19 of the 22 council wards within Preston City Council which is based at Preston Town Hall on Lancaster Road. From the 2024 General Election, Preston is divided between two Westminster constituencies, namely Preston and Ribble Valley. The County Hall is located on Fishergate and is the main office for Lancashire County Council.

== Geography ==
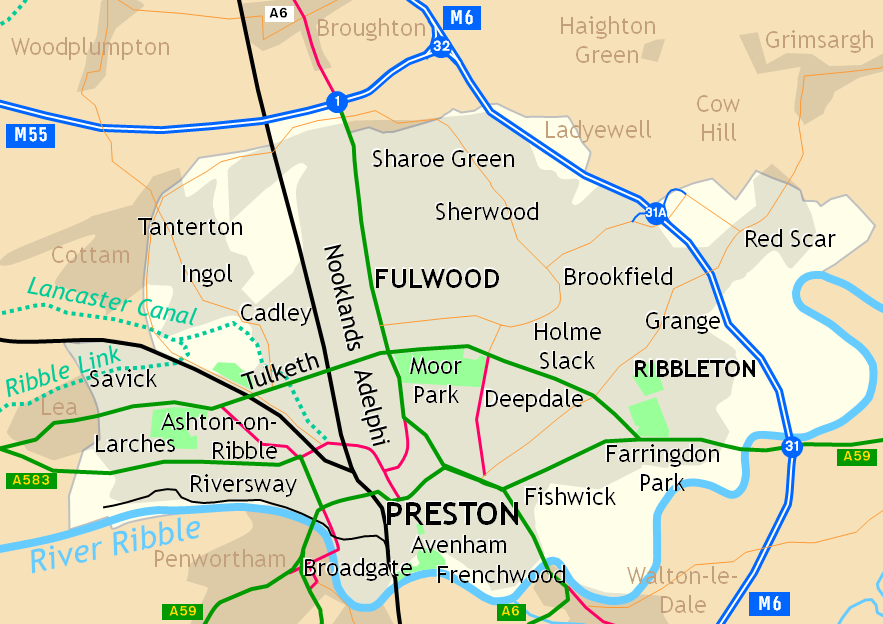
Regions of Preston

The River Ribble provides a southern border for the city. The Forest of Bowland forms a backdrop to the city to the north-east, while the Fylde lies to the west. Preston is located approximately 27 miles (43 km) north-west of Manchester, 26 miles (42 km) north-east of Liverpool and 15 miles (24 km) east of Blackpool.

The current borders came into effect on 1 April 1974, when the Local Government Act 1972 merged the existing County Borough of Preston with Fulwood Urban District as an unparished area within the Borough of Preston. Preston was designated as part of the Central Lancashire new town in 1970.

=== Climate ===
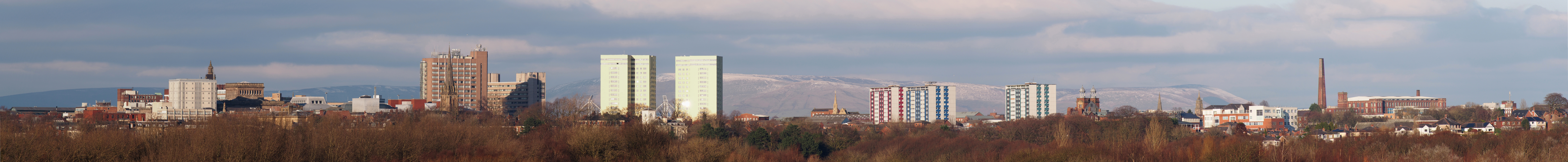
A panoramic view of Preston, viewed from Penwortham Lane

The climate of Preston is of a temperate maritime type, with a narrow range of temperatures, similar to the rest of the British Isles. Being relatively close to the Irish sea, this is more pronounced than areas to the south and east of Preston. The official Met Office weather station is located at Moor Park, less than 1 mile (1.6 km) north of the city centre, and surrounded by built-up areas, suggesting a degree of urban warming is likely, particularly during clear and calm nights.

The absolute high recorded at the weather station was 38.2 °C (100.8 °F) during July 2022. In a typical year, the warmest day should reach 27.6 °C (81.7 °F) and 5.9 days in total should attain a maximum temperature of 25.1 °C (77.2 °F) or more. In October 2011, a new record October high temperature of 26.9 °C was set.

The absolute minimum is −13.3 °C (8.1 °F), recorded during February 1969. In a typical year, the coldest night should fall to −6.8 °C (19.8 °F), and 40.2 nights should receive an air frost. The lowest temperature in recent years was −9.2 °C (15.4 °F) during December 2010.

Annual rainfall totals just under 1000 mm per year, with over 1 mm of precipitation falling on 150 days. All averages refer to the period 1971–2000.

In October 2014, Preston was officially ranked the Wettest city in England and third wettest in the UK behind Cardiff and Glasgow. It was also ranked the Gloomiest city in England, as it gets fewer hours of sunshine in a year than any other English city or town.

However, in March 2018 the Lancashire Evening Post reported that Preston has lost its "soggy city status" to the neighbouring city of Lancaster.

On 10 August 1893, approximately 32 millimetres (1.3 in) of rain fell in Preston within five minutes, a record for the most rainfall to fall in that time in the United Kingdom.

Climate data for Preston Moor Park, elevation 33 m, 1971–2000, extremes 1960–2005
Month	Jan	Feb	Mar	Apr	May	Jun	Jul	Aug	Sep	Oct	Nov	Dec	Year
Record high °C (°F)	14.1 (57.4)	16.2 (61.2)	22.2 (72.0)	24.0 (75.2)	27.3 (81.1)	30.6 (87.1)	38.2 (100.8)	33.1 (91.6)	26.8 (80.2)	23.6 (74.5)	18.4 (65.1)	15.6 (60.1)	33.1 (91.6)
Mean daily maximum °C (°F)	6.9 (44.4)	7.3 (45.1)	9.4 (48.9)	12.0 (53.6)	15.6 (60.1)	17.7 (63.9)	19.8 (67.6)	19.5 (67.1)	16.8 (62.2)	13.4 (56.1)	9.7 (49.5)	7.7 (45.9)	13.0 (55.4)
Mean daily minimum °C (°F)	1.7 (35.1)	1.9 (35.4)	3.1 (37.6)	4.5 (40.1)	7.1 (44.8)	10.0 (50.0)	12.2 (54.0)	12.1 (53.8)	9.9 (49.8)	7.3 (45.1)	4.0 (39.2)	2.4 (36.3)	6.4 (43.5)
Record low °C (°F)	−11.1 (12.0)	−13.3 (8.1)	−9.4 (15.1)	−4.5 (23.9)	−2.3 (27.9)	0.6 (33.1)	4.4 (39.9)	2.8 (37.0)	−0.5 (31.1)	−5.2 (22.6)	−6.7 (19.9)	−12.8 (9.0)	−13.3 (8.1)
Average precipitation mm (inches)	93.83 (3.69)	63.66 (2.51)	79.11 (3.11)	52.08 (2.05)	58.79 (2.31)	73.51 (2.89)	65.40 (2.57)	86.51 (3.41)	92.00 (3.62)	113.78 (4.48)	103.86 (4.09)	112.02 (4.41)	997.99 (39.29)
Average snowy days	2	2	1	1	0	0	0	0	0	0	1	2	9
Source: KNMI

== Religion ==
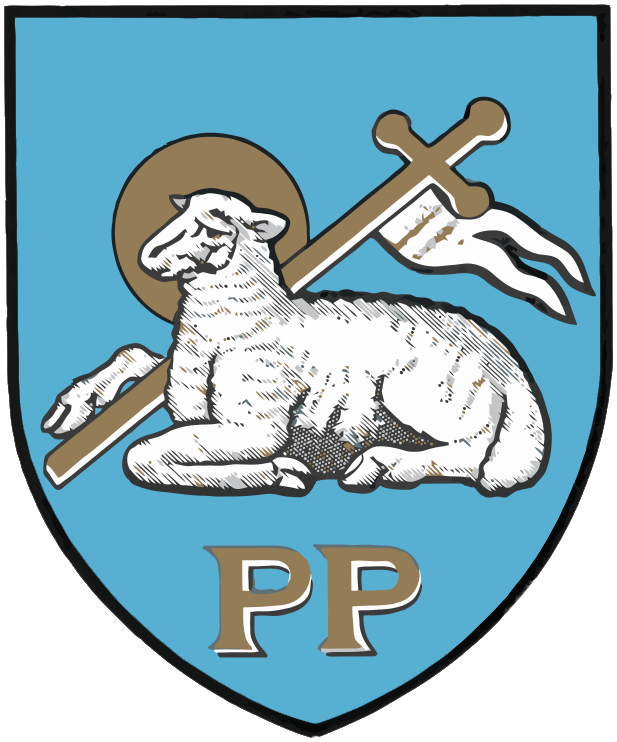
Coat of arms of Preston City Council showing the city shield

One of the proposed derivations of the city's name coming from 'Priests' town'. The lamb on the city shield is a biblical image of Jesus Christ, and the same image that represented seventh-century bishop St Wilfrid, the city's patron saint who is historically linked to the city's establishment. The "PP" on the city shield stands for "Princeps Pacis" (Prince of Peace), another title for Christ invoking Him as protector of the city, though it is also often taken to stand for the city's nickname "Proud Preston". In fact, there were originally three letters "P" on the coat of arms, with one being lost over time.

The 2001 Census recorded 72% of the population of the City of Preston as Christians, 10% as having no religion, and 8% as Muslims. The Hindu and Sikh populations are smaller at 3% and 0.6% respectively but, in both cases, this represents the highest percentage of any local authority area in the North West. 2% of the city's population were born in other EU countries. Though still small in number in Preston, the Latter-day Saints maintain a large profile.

Preston has places of worship for people of a wide variety of religions, including churches of many Christian denominations. There are also places of worship for Buddhists, Hindus, Muslims, the Jehovah's Witnesses, Latter-day Saints, Sikhs and The Salvation Army, amongst others. Preston was also home to an Ashkenazi Orthodox Jewish synagogue on Avenham Place, formed in 1882, but this closed during the mid-1980s.

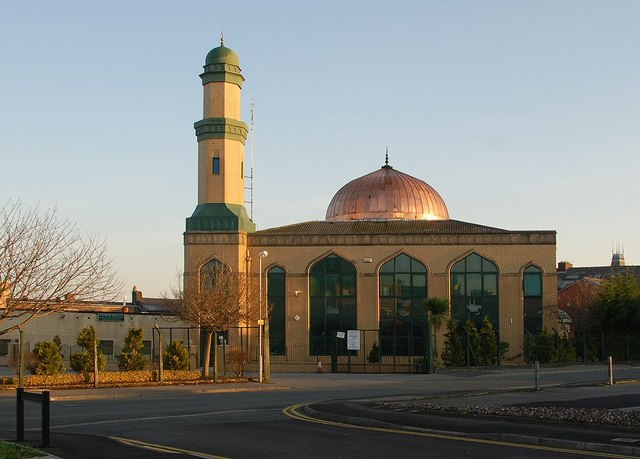
Masjid-e-Noor on Noor Street

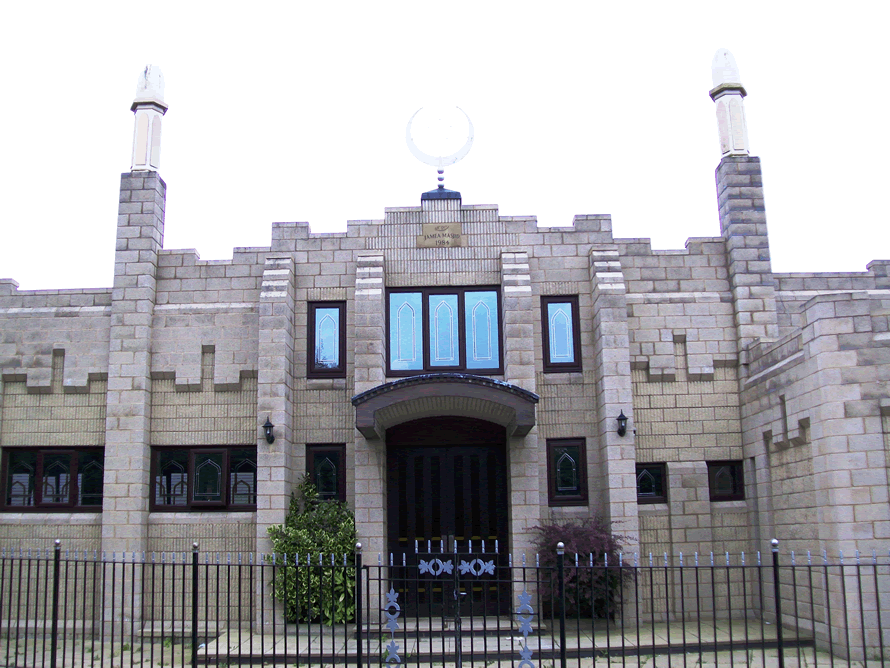
Jamea Masjid close to Preston City Centre

Preston has a significant Muslim (Sunni Branch, particularly Hanafi school) population, the majority of which is of Gujarati Indian descent. The Muslim population is centred in the Deepdale, Riversway, Fishwick, Fulwood and Frenchwood areas. Preston has 12 mosques: five in Deepdale & St George's, one in Frenchwood, one in Riversway, two in Adelphi and three in Fishwick.

=== Church denominations ===
A wide range of denominations are, or have been, represented in the city including: Latin Church Catholics, Baptist, Christadelphian, Congregational, Countess of Huntingdon's Connexion, Evangelical, Methodist, Pentecostal, Presbyterian, Swedenborgian and Wesleyan Methodist. The Society of Friends meet at the Preston Friends Meeting House at 189 St George's Road.

Preston has a strong Roman Catholic Christian history and tradition, recently noted by Archbishop Vincent Nichols in his Guild 2012 Mass Homily: "The history of the Christian and Catholic faith is long and deep here in Preston." Preston lies in the Roman Catholic Diocese of Lancaster and the Anglican Diocese of Blackburn. There are at least 73 churches, chapels, missions and meeting houses, as well as 15 cemeteries and burial sites, for which records exist.

Carey Baptist Church, on Pole Street, was built in 1826 for the Calvinistic Methodists of Lady Huntington. Formerly known as St Paul's Chapel, it was purchased by the Baptists in 1855. It is a Grade II listed building. The church survives remains active in the community.

Preston was the location of the world's first foreign mission of the Church of Jesus Christ of Latter-day Saints (commonly known as the Mormons). As early as 1837 the first Latter-day Saint missionaries to Great Britain began preaching in Preston and, in particular, other small towns situated along the River Ribble. Preston is home to the world's oldest continuous branch (a small congregation) of the church. An official memorial to the church pioneers may be found in the Japanese Garden in Avenham Park. In 1998, the church erected a large temple at Chorley, near Preston, and has been described as "spectacular". The temple is officially known as the Preston England Temple.

=== Church buildings ===
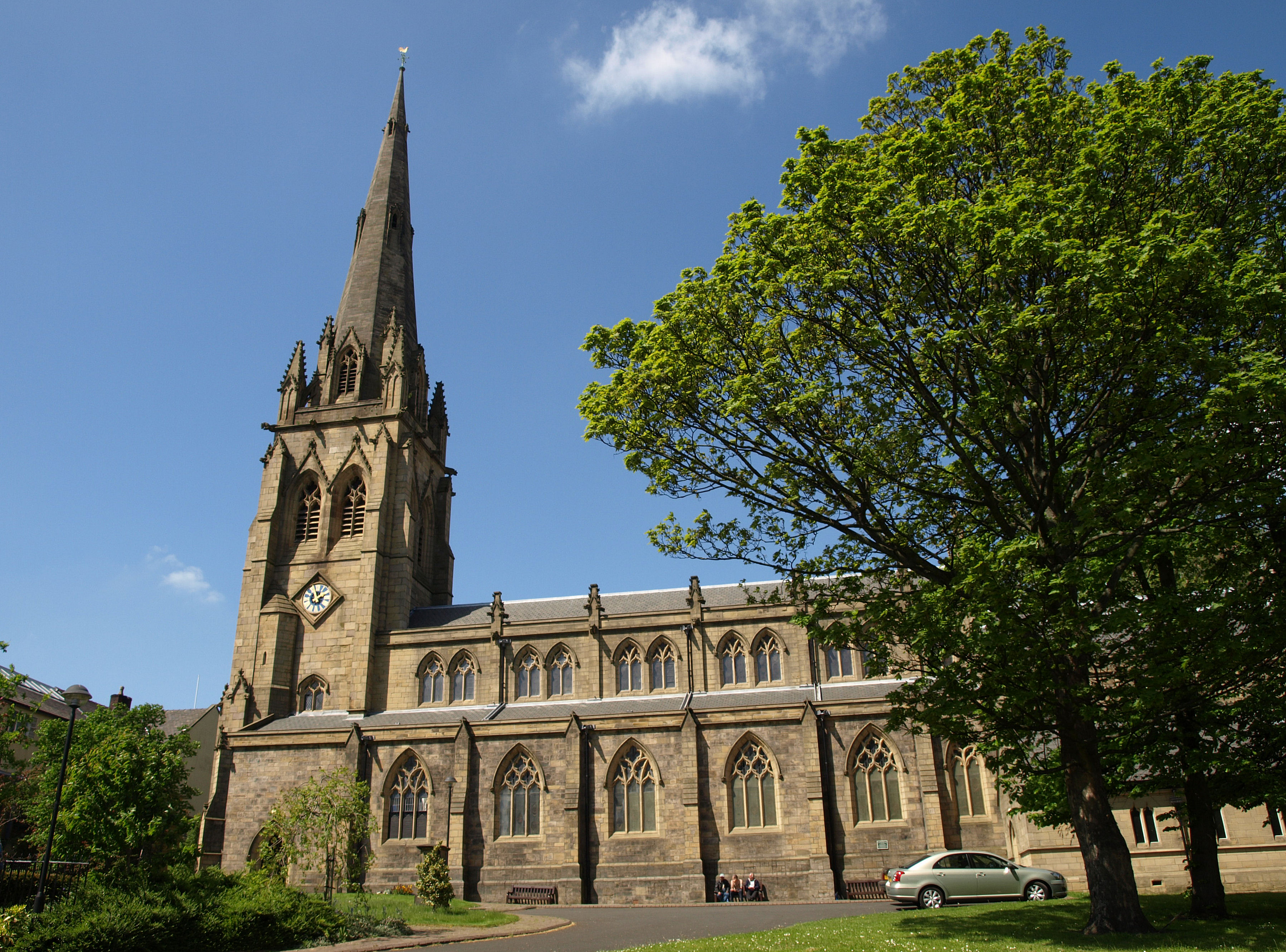
St. John's Minster on Church Street

St. John's Minster, formerly the Church of St John the Evangelist and St Wilfrid's Parish Church, prior to the reformation, is located on Church Street, in the centre of the city. From its origin, it has been the parish church of Preston. The church of St George the Martyr, located on Georges Road, was founded in 1723. One of the many large active Roman Catholic parish churches is St Thomas of Canterbury and the English Martyrs, located on Garstang Road.

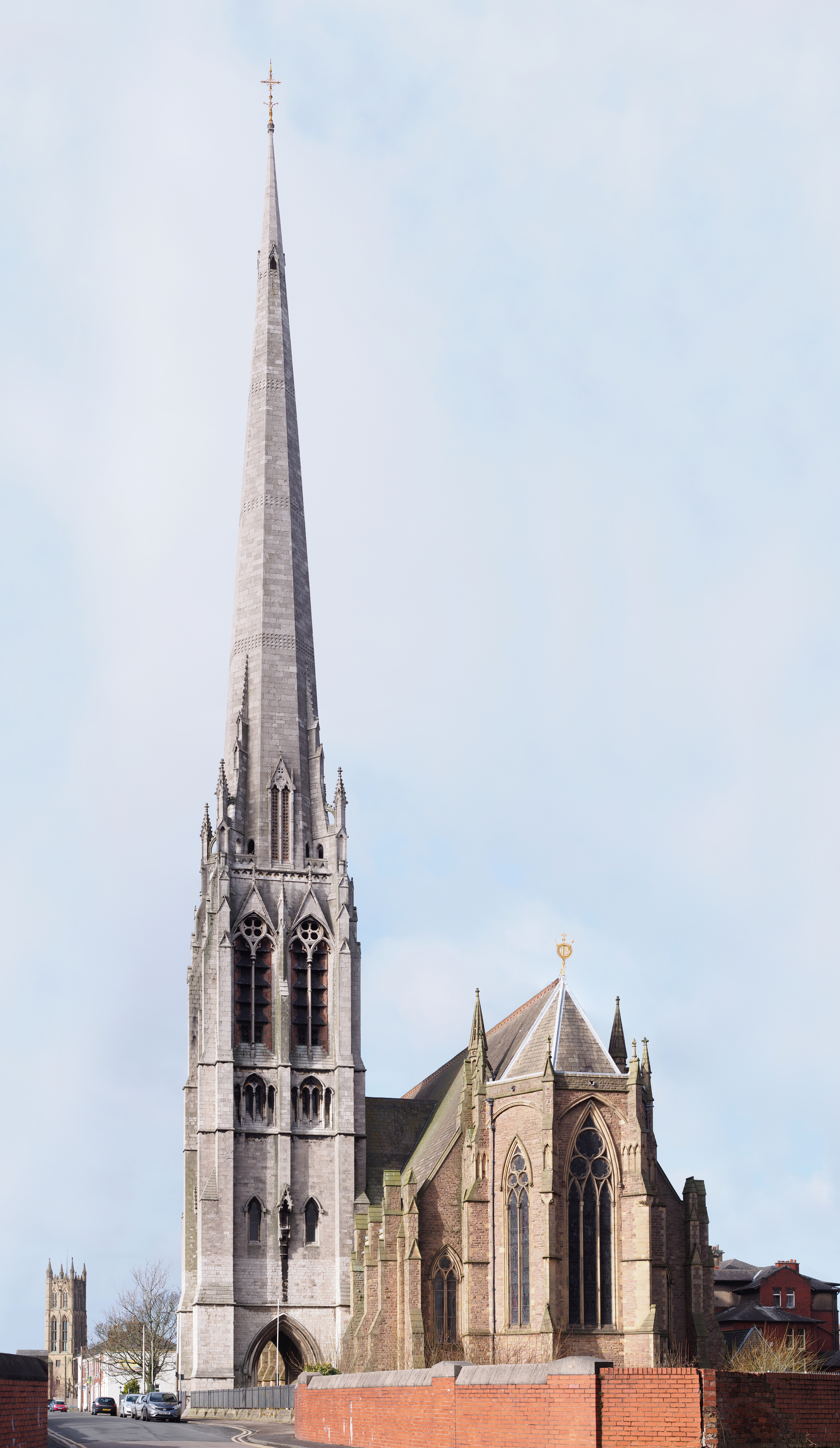
St. Walburge's Church

St Walburge's Church, designed by Joseph Hansom of Hansom Cab fame, has the tallest spire in England on a church that is not a cathedral and the third tallest in the UK; it is 309 feet (94 m) high.

In July 2016, St Ignatius Church in Preston, which had been gifted by the Catholic Diocese of Lancaster to the Syro-Malabar Catholic community, was raised to the status of a cathedral by Pope Francis. It now serves as the seat of the Syro-Malabar Catholic Eparchy of Great Britain.

== Landmarks ==
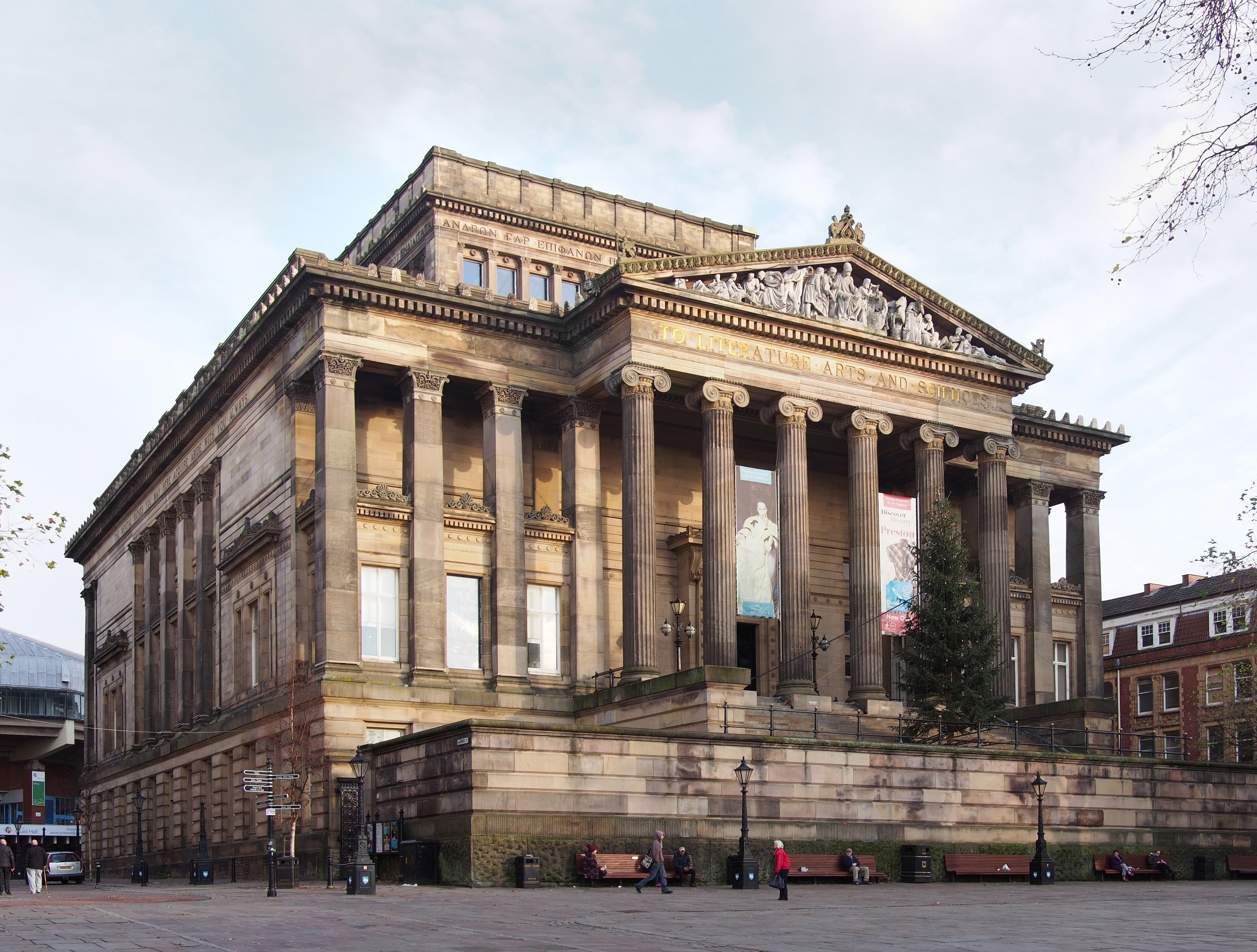
The Harris Museum

There are many notable buildings dotted in and around the city centre, including the Miller Arcade, the Town Hall, the Harris Museum, the Minster Church of St. John the Evangelist (formerly Preston Parish Church, elevated to Minster church status in June 2003), the former Corn Exchange and Public Hall, St. Wilfrid's Catholic Church, Fishergate Baptist Church and many beautiful Georgian buildings on Winckley Square. Many Catholic and Anglican parish churches are also to be found throughout the city. HMP Preston is also a good example of a typical Victorian radial-design prison.

Modern architecture is represented by the Guild Hall and Preston bus station, which was featured on the 2012 World Monuments Fund's list of sites at risk due to threats of demolition, before becoming Grade II listed.

Museums	Parks	Nature reserves
Harris Museum and Art Gallery; Broughton Cottage Museum; Lancashire Infantry Museum; Ribble Steam Railway; Museum of Lancashire	Avenham Park; Ashton Park; Moor Park; Miller Park; Ribbleton Park; Winckley Square; Brookfield Park; Conway Park; Haslam Park; Mill Lane Park	Brockholes (nature reserve); Conway Park Woods; Fishwick Nature Reserve; Grange Valley; Highgate Park Woods; Hills and Hollows; Mason's Wood; Pope Lane Field and Boilton Wood; Squire Andertons Wood

=== Listed buildings ===
Grade I	Grade II*	Grade II	
Harris Public Library, Museum and Art Gallery; Preston Cenotaph; St Walburge's Church	Arkwright House; Avenham Park; The Bull and Royal Hotel; Harris Institute; Miller Park; Moor Park; St George the Martyr's Church; St Ignatius Church; St John's Minster; St Mark's Church; St Michael and All Angels Church; St Peter's Church; St Wilfrid's Church; Sessions House	All Saints Church; Bus Station; Carey Baptist Church; Covered Market and Fish Market; Deepdale Hall (former Royal Infirmary); Emmanuel Church; English Martyrs Church; Fishergate Baptist Church; Fishergate Bridge; Miller Arcade; North Road Pentecostal Church; Penwortham Old Bridge; Post Office, Birley Street; Preston railway station	Public Hall (Corn Exchange); Ribbleton railway station; St Andrew's Church; St Augustine's Church portico and towers; St Joseph's Church; St Luke's Church; St Mary's Church; St Paul's Church; St Thomas' Church; Town Hall; Tulketh Mill; Windmill, Cragg's Row; and hundreds more

The chimney of the Grade II listed Tulketh Mill was designed by engineer Fred Dixon of Bolton for the Tulketh Spinning Company and dates from 1905. It has its own Grade II listing, the designation record describing it as "very tall, forms group with associated mill, both being very prominent landmarks to the north-west of the town".

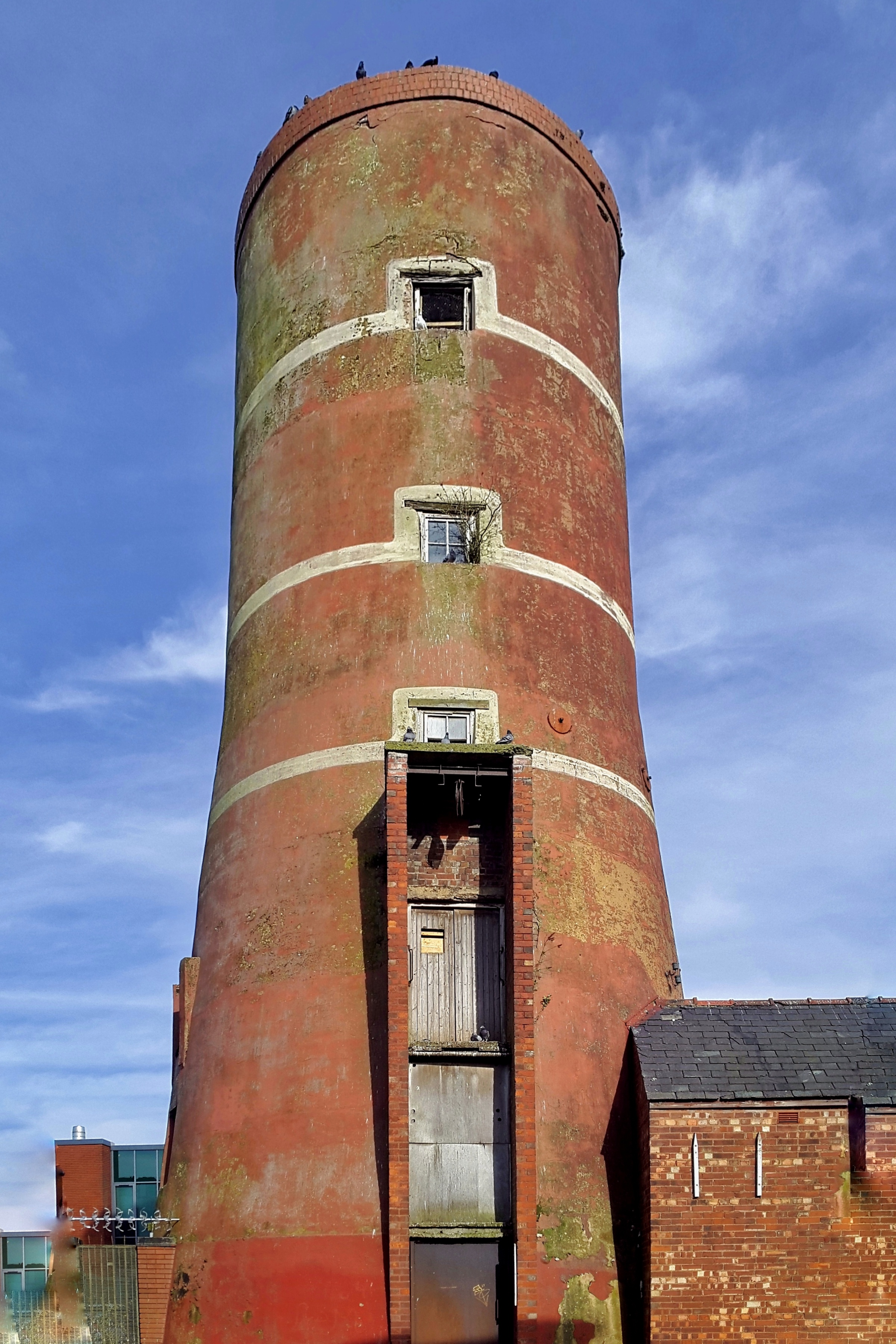
The old windmill on Cragg's Row

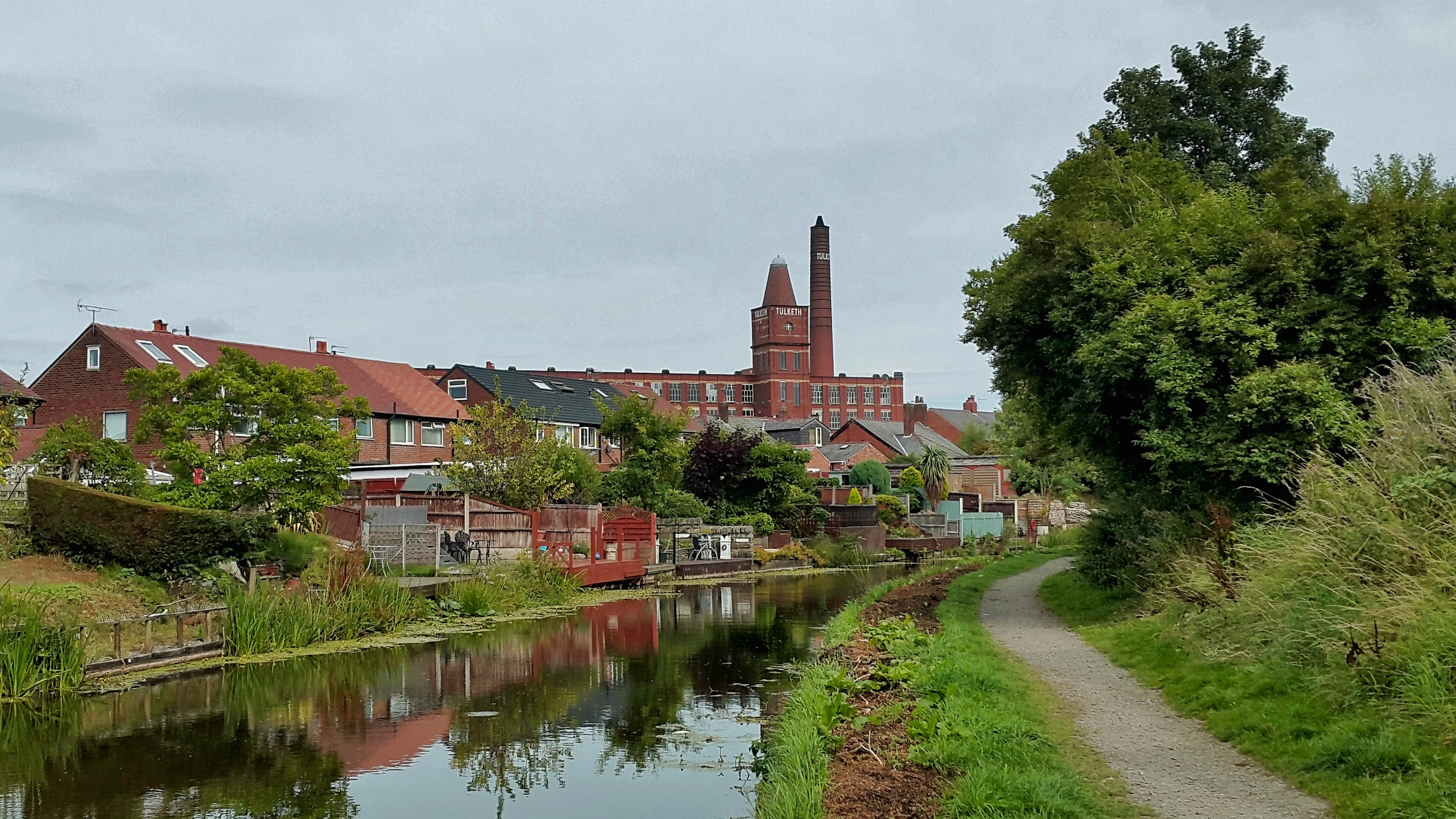
Tulketh Mill and its chimney, as seen from the Lancaster Canal

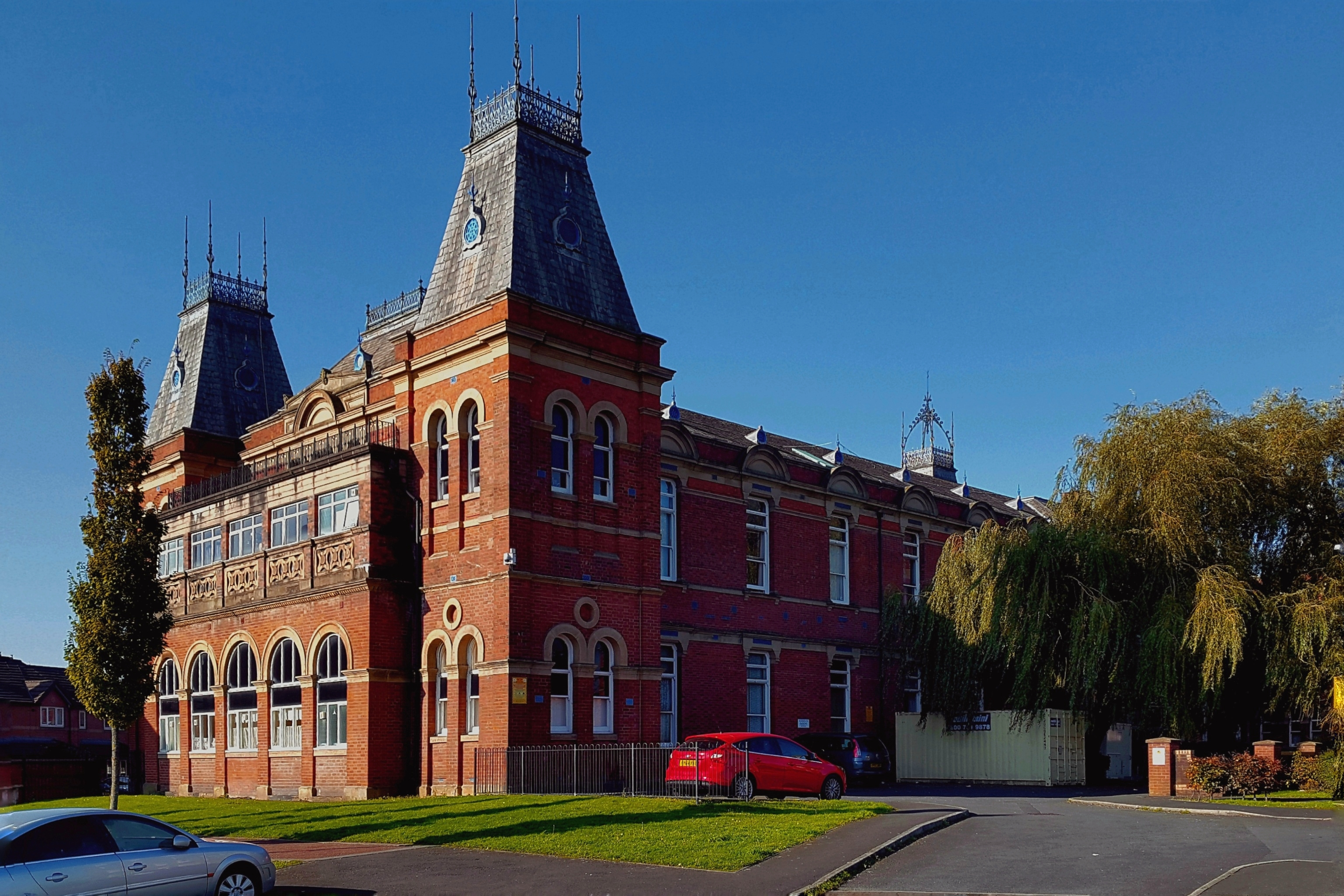
Deepdale Hall

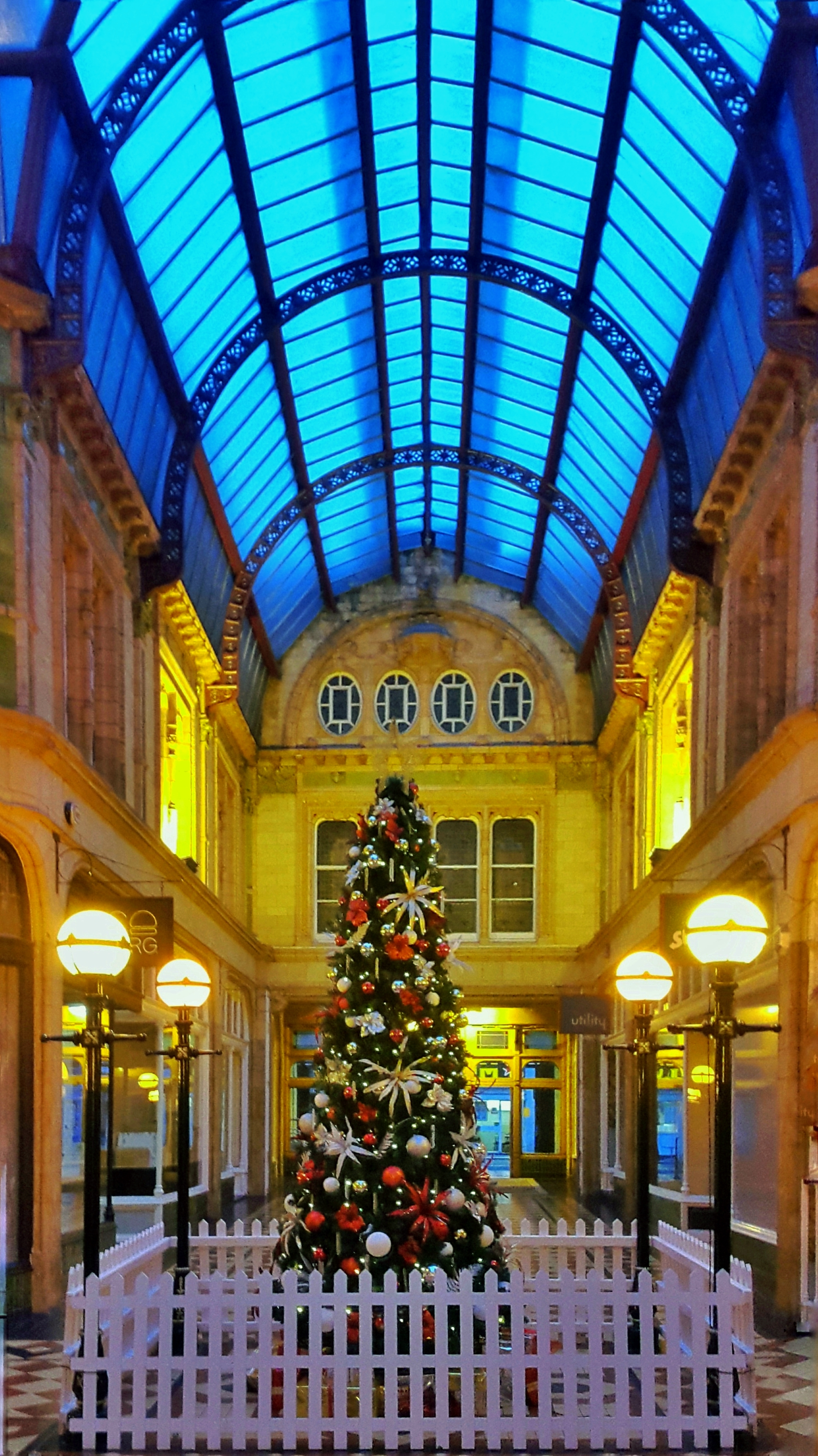
The interior of Miller Arcade at Christmas

=== Monuments and public artworks ===
Preston has a number of notable monuments and public artworks, including:

- Obelisk: located opposite the Cenotaph on Preston's Market Square, the Obelisk dates back to 1782 and was originally installed for the Guild celebration of the same year.
- Peace Gardens: located on Friargate, the gardens, designed by Graham Mort, originally housed the praying hands sculpture which now resides on Fylde Road.
- Preston Martyrs' Memorial: located in front of the Corn Exchange in Lune Street, this sculpture marks the site of the Lune Street Riots which occurred during the 1842 General Strike, when troops opened fire on striking mills workers, killing four and injuring three.
- The Splash: a sculpture of Tom Finney, located in front of the Deepdale football stadium. The statue is based upon a famous photo taken of Finney in a game against Chelsea in 1956, which was named England's Sports Photograph of the Year.
- The bronze statues of Wallace and Gromit, with Wallace in Wrong Trousers and Gromit reading his newspaper on the bench, was erected in September 2021 at the south market hall entrance to the Covered Market to commemorate its creator Nick Park, who originated from Preston. Their archnemesis, Feathers McGraw, soon joined them when his statue was unveiled by Nick Park as part of the opening of the Animate extension in February 2025.
- Cotton Reel: designed by artist designed by Van Nong, this sculpture of a large cotton reel and needle is located in Avenham Road (between the city centre and Avenham Park) and commemorates the former Simpsons Gold Thread Works, which advanced the science of gold thread manufacture and from 1839 provided gold and silver thread for the military, royalty, cruise ships (including Titanic) and freemasonry.
- Landscape With Trees: designed by artist Clare Bigger, this series of four-metre high stainless steel pylons of stylised trees is located in Friargate in the city centre.
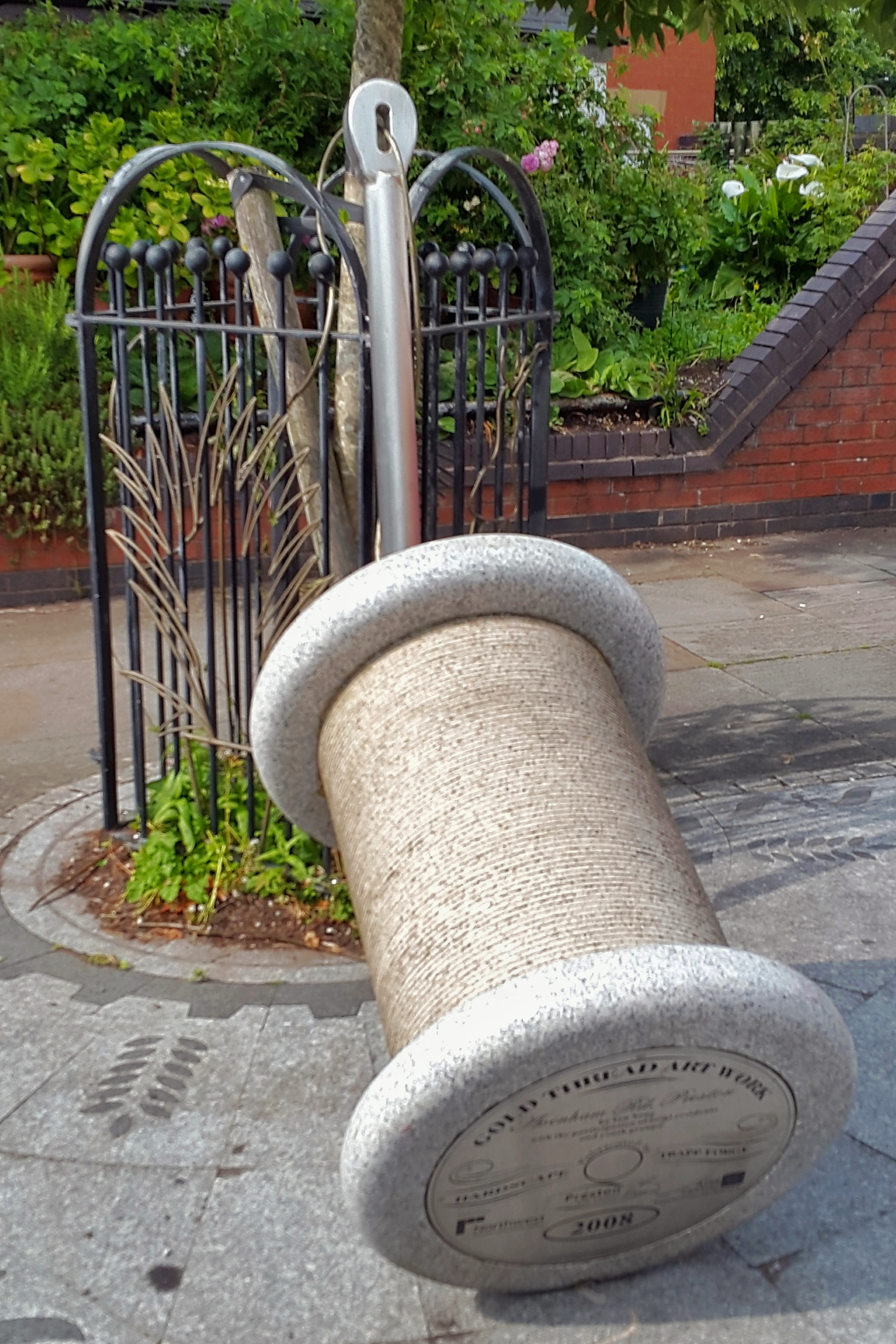
The Cotton Reel in Avenham Road

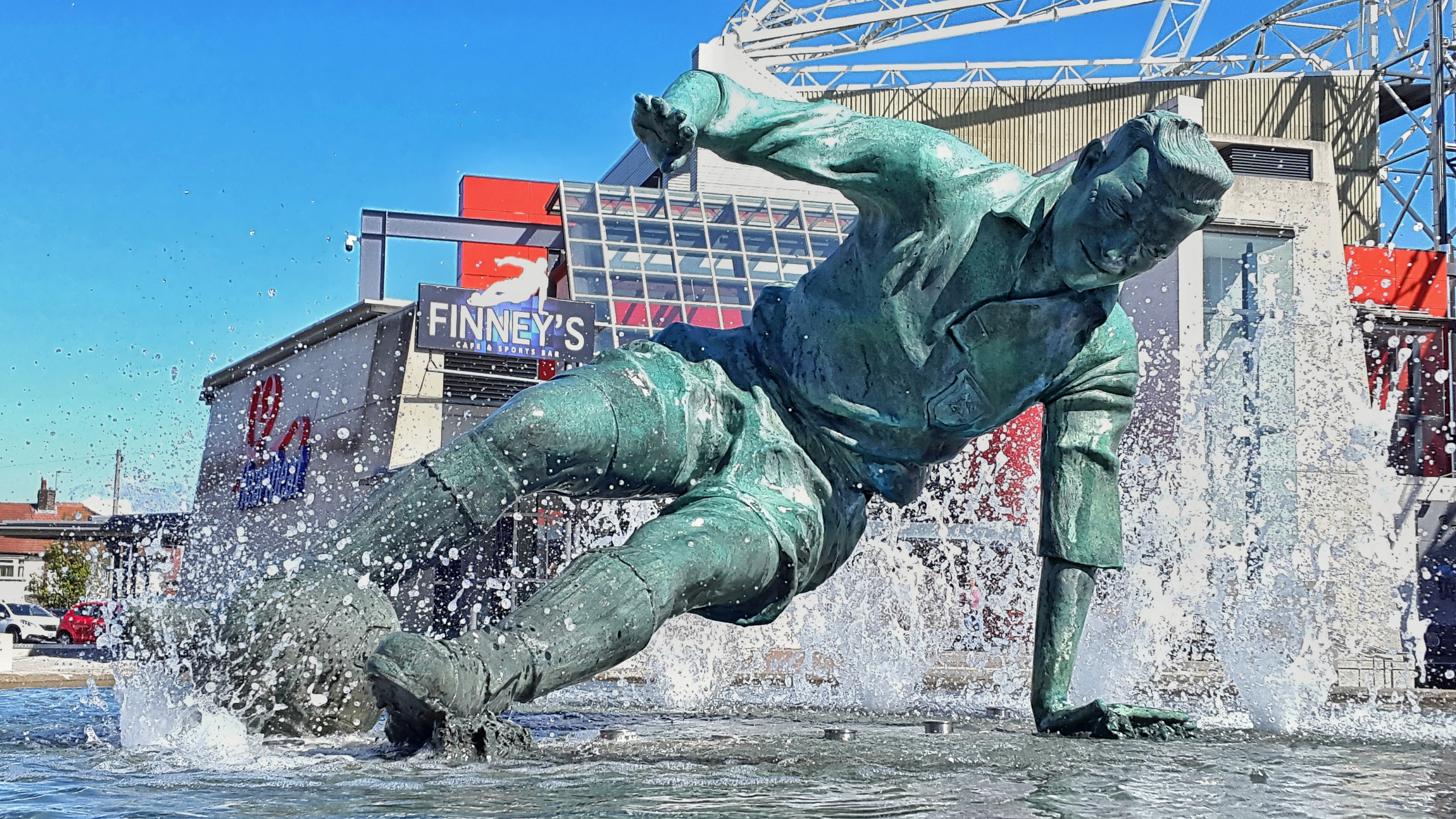
The Splash, depicting Tom Finney, at Deepdale Stadium

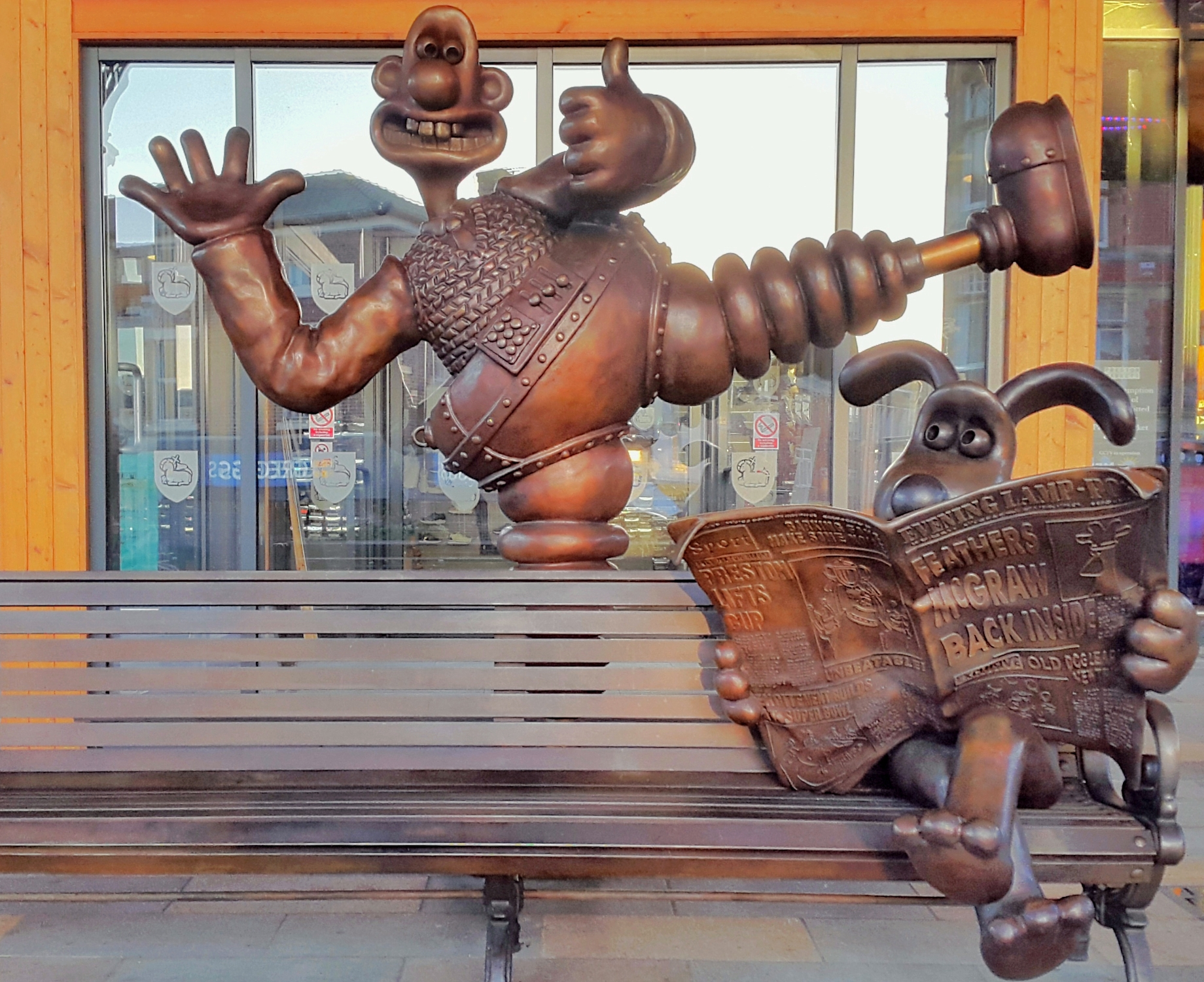
The statues of Wallace and Gromit at the Preston Market Hall

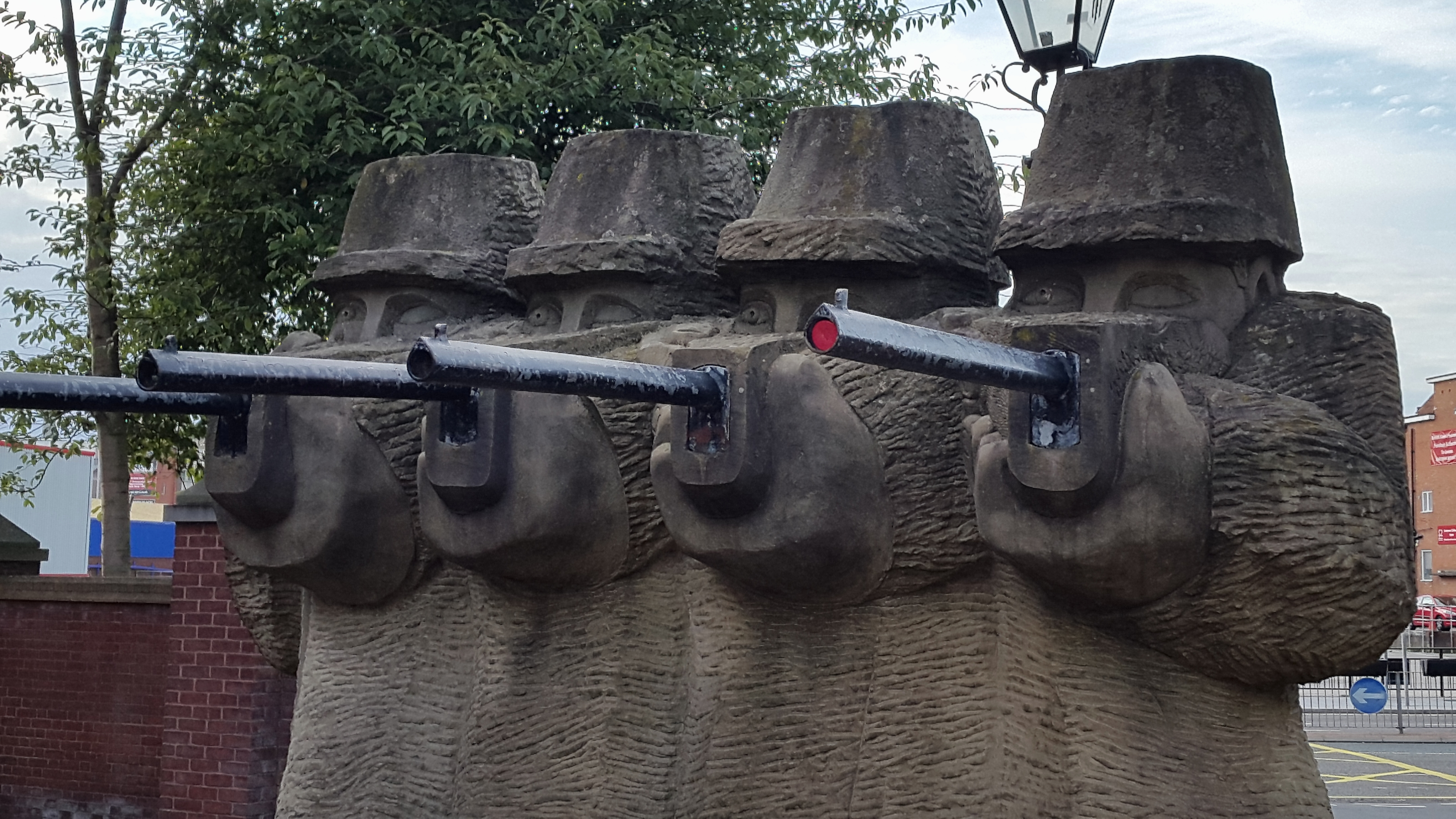
Preston Martyrs' Memorial (the troops)

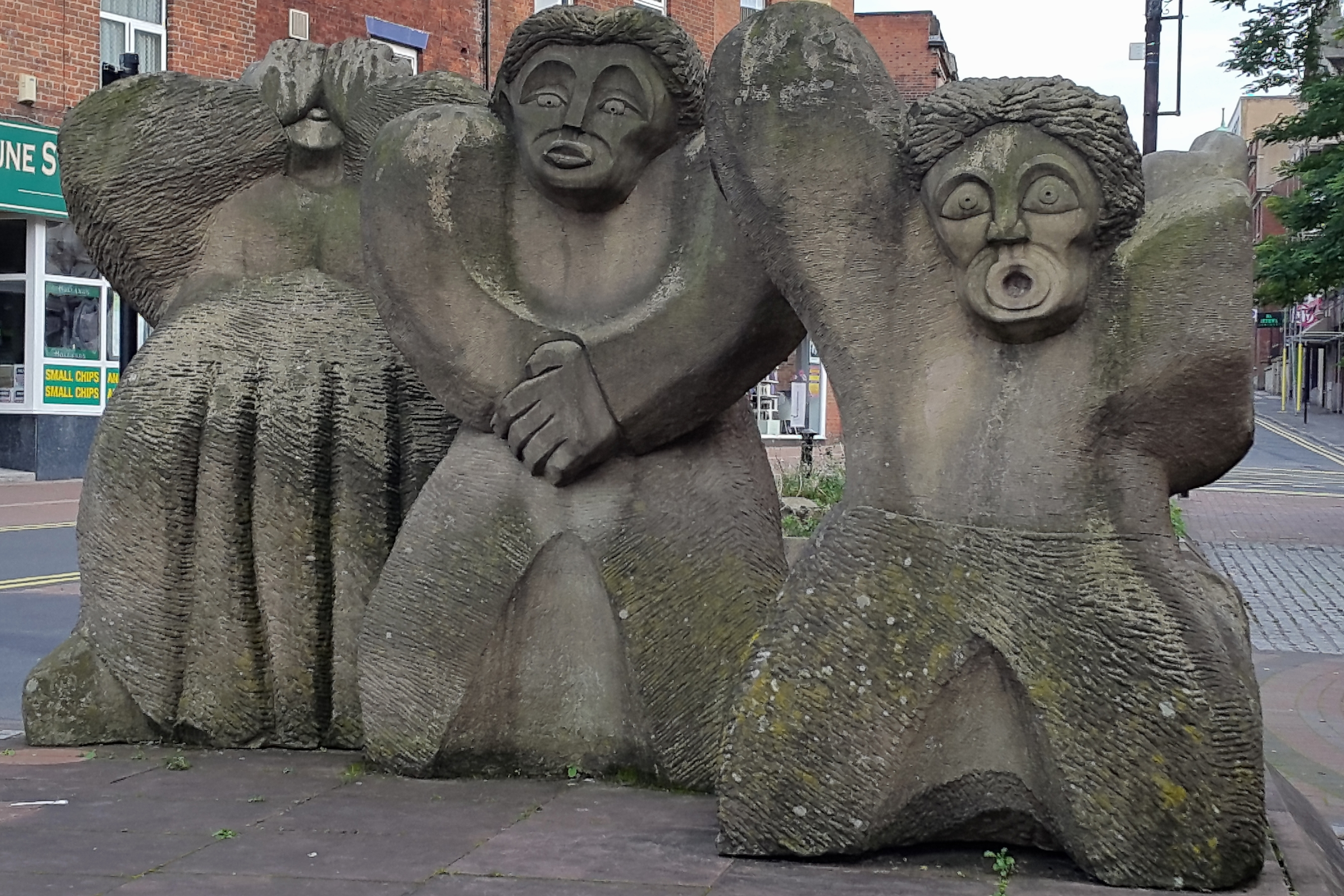
Preston Martyrs' Memorial (the victims)

== Economy ==
Preston has seen many changes over the course of its history in regards to its local economy, shifting from a market town to the textile industry and more recently to tertiary education and research.

The city was home to Alstom Transport's main UK spare parts distribution centre (formerly GEC Traction Ltd), until it transferred operations to Widnes in July 2018. Matalan Retail Ltd was also founded in Preston under the name Matalan Cash and Carry. Although the head office of Matalan moved to Skelmersdale in 1998, the city still has the tax office for the company (located in Winckley Square).

Goss Graphic Systems Limited, a global supplier of printing presses based in the United States, formerly employed more than 1,000 people in Preston, but in 2007 the company moved manufacturing to the United States, China and Japan and now has around 160 employees in the city.

Unemployment in Preston rose 15% in the year up to April 2012, to a total of 3,783 claimants. However, in November 2018, Preston was named as Most improved city in UK, with unemployment down to 3.1% from 6.5% in 2014, and improvements above the national average for health, transport, the work-life balance of its residents, and for the skills among both the youth and adult populations.

=== Major employers ===
Preston is a major centre of the British defence aerospace industry with BAE Systems, the UK's principal military aircraft design, development and manufacture supplier, having its Military Aircraft headquarters located in nearby Warton. The company has two of its major facilities located some miles on either side of the city. BAE Warton is located to the western side of the city whilst BAE Samlesbury is located to the east, over the M6 motorway. BAE Systems also operate large office facilities at the Portway area within the city and at The Strand office complex.

On 20 February 2006, the telecommunications retailer The Carphone Warehouse took over Tulketh Mill (formerly the home of the Littlewoods catalogue call centre) in the Ashton-on-Ribble area of the city. The building has undergone an extensive interior refurbishment and since March 2007 had been the workplace of some 800 employees. The site's main purpose was as a call centre for the broadband and landline services provider TalkTalk as well as The Post Office and Student Loans Company. The site also housed call centres for Team Knowhow and Carphone Warehouse which are now part of Dixons Carphone. It was officially opened on 19 December 2006 by CEO Charles Dunstone and the Mayor of Preston. Following the COVID-19 pandemic, Dixons Carphone along with other tenants within Tulketh Mill, moved to a hybrid working solution (time split between working from home and working from the office), eventually moving to a permanent working from home solution and as of August 2022 Dixons Carphone no longer have any operations based in Tulketh Mill.

Due to Preston's location as a transport hub, sitting between the M6, M55, M61 and M65, it is home to several freight and haulage companies. Haulage supplier and operator James Hall and Co, which supplies produce for Spar stores in the north of England, have their head office – the biggest building in the city of Preston – located just off the M6 junction 31a at Bowland View.

The Riversway area (in the Ashton-on-Ribble area of the city) is also home to the Preston Docklands, once Europe's largest single dock basin, which has undergone redevelopment. Several office areas surround the docks, along with significant residential presence. Several small businesses such as the Football League's LFE headquarters are based in the area, together with Riversway Developments which have been responsible for some of this redevelopment.

The financial sector also has a presence in the city with a large selection of consultancies, insurance and law firms based in Winckley Square in the city centre.

The Westinghouse Electric Company (formerly BNFL) Springfields nuclear processing plant also lies to the west of the city boundary at Salwick.

Skiddle is an event ticketing operation based in Preston since 2001, which claims to be the UK's largest what's on guide.

=== Retail ===
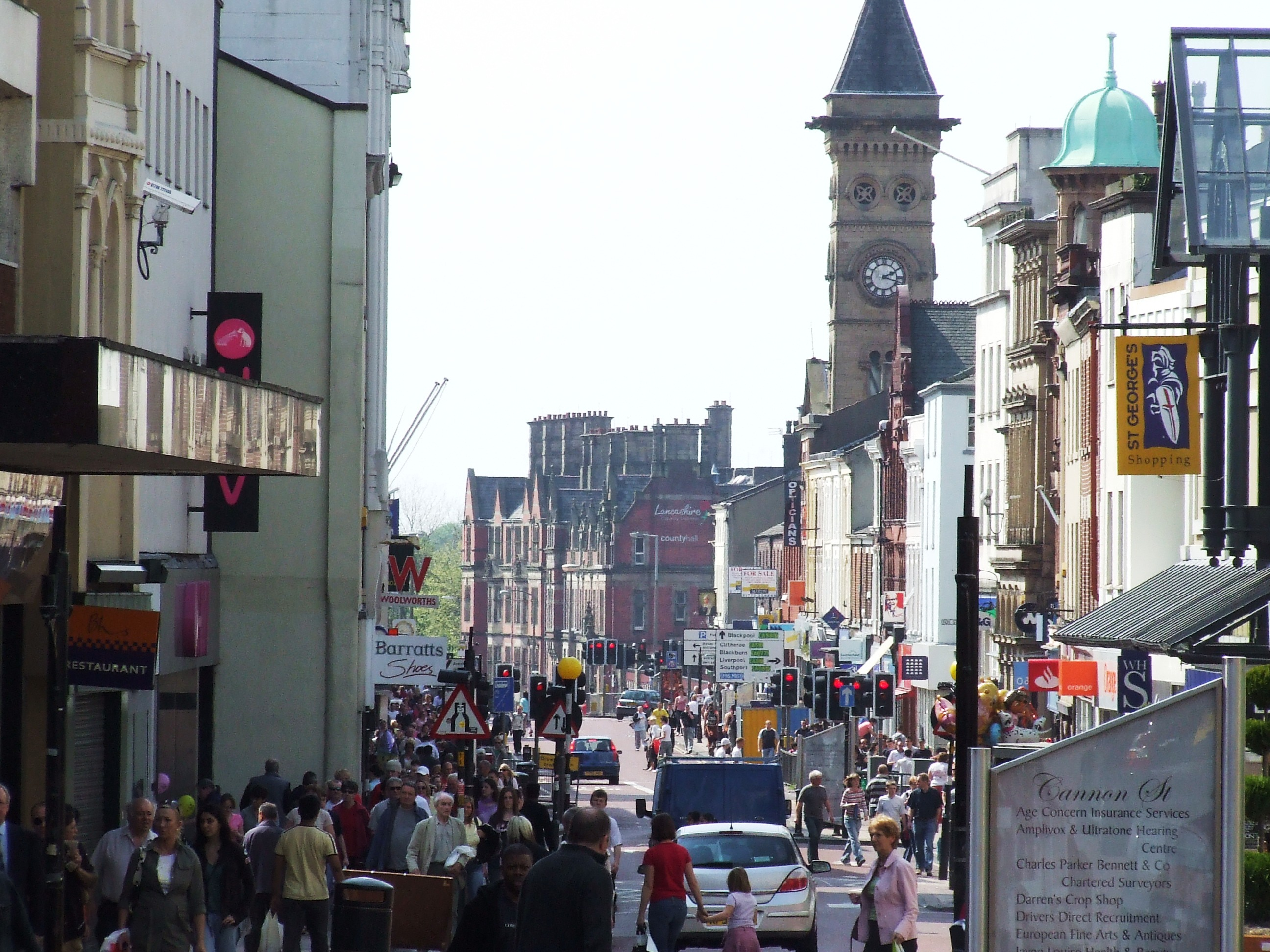
Fishergate, Preston's main shopping district

Retail is also a major contributor to Preston's economy. The city's main high streets are Fishergate and Friargate which offer shops, bars and restaurants with many more tucked away down the side streets. Two major shopping centres are located along the high streets:

- Fishergate Shopping Centre – which had a Debenhams department store (closed May 2021)
- St George's Shopping Centre (formerly The Mall Preston) – a popular centrally-located shopping centre, dating from the 1960s.

Preston is also home to the historic Covered Market and Fishmarket. In 2016, these sites were redeveloped, and the old covered market now contains the new Market Hall and the Outdoor and Secondhand Markets, and the old fish market now contains the Box Market, a unique shopping space consisting of upgraded shipping containers. Vendors sell fresh food and drinks. Markets are open Monday–Saturday and a car boot sale operates from the outdoor market on Tuesdays.

Also in the city centre is the Miller Arcade, a specialist shopping centre in a listed building (which formerly included a Victorian Turkish baths), is situated off Fishergate near the Harris Museum.

The first KFC outlet in the UK was opened on Fishergate in 1965. The Flag Market is the home of fast food provider SpudBros. They are based at the Hot Potato Tram which has been serving up baked potatoes and parched peas to Preston visitors since 1955.

A number of large retail shopping centres can be found in Preston's suburbs and surrounding towns, including:

- Deepdale Shopping park, on the A5085 Blackpool Road on the northern edge of the city, has over 30 major stores Free parking is provided for over 1,000 cars.
- Riversway Retail Park, located off the A583 Riversway at Ashton-on-Ribble. Free parking is provided.
- Capitol Centre Retail Park on the A6 London Way just outside the city boundary at Walton-le-Dale, in the neighbouring borough of South Ribble. The centre has over 20 major stores. Free car parking is provided along with a bus interchange.
- South Rings Business Park is located several miles outside Preston, off the A6 at Bamber Bridge, near the intersection of the M6, M65 and M61 motorways. Free car parking is provided.

=== Education and research ===
The University of Lancashire has become a major employer and source of economic growth not just for Preston in recent years, but for Lancashire as a whole, providing direct and indirect benefits to the local economy through employment, housing and retail.

The Regeneris Report, commissioned by the Lancashire County Council in 2013/14, found that the university:

- contributed over £200m to the North West's economy
- was one of the largest employers in Preston and supported an estimated 4,300 Full-Time Equivalent (FTE) jobs in the North West through its core economic footprint and through the expenditure of students
- with 36,160 students was the largest university in Lancashire and the third-largest in the North West, with the ninth largest undergraduate population of all UK universities
- graduates add on average £24m to the North West economy per annum through increased skills and productivity

In terms of direct economic benefits, in 2013/14 it:

- directly employed 3,290 staff
- spent £15 million on suppliers based throughout Lancashire and the wider North West area
- had 18,390 full-time students residing in the North West who spent a total of £210m throughout the region, with £155m of that being spent in Lancashire.

In 2015, it announced its intention to create historic and transformational change at its Preston Campus through a £200 million development programme entitled Campus Masterplan 2020. Its vision over the next five years is to create a unified, sustainable and welcoming campus which will enhance the experience for all those visiting the university. The long-term vision is to spark a major focus on regeneration and business investment in the university quarter, reinforce the university's ties to the local community and create wider benefits for Preston and beyond.

September 2019 saw the opening of the £35 million Engineering Innovation Centre (EIC), a facility with integrated teaching and research space.

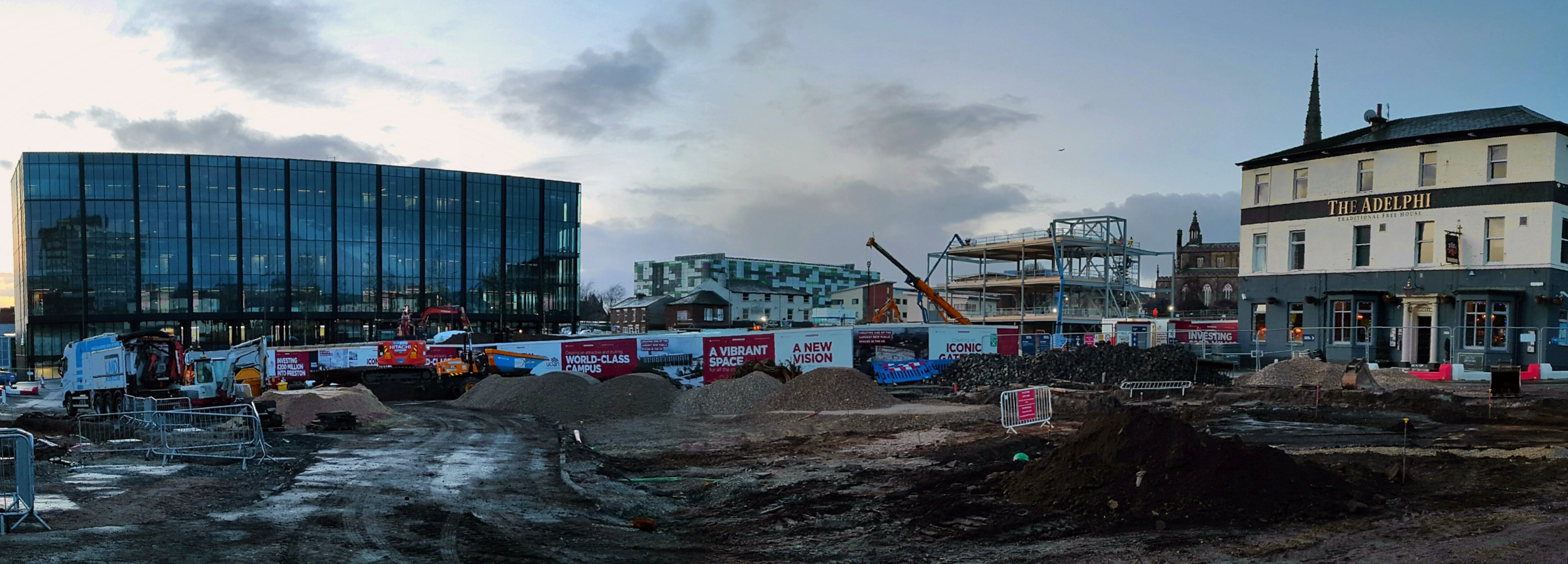
Construction of UCLan's new student centre and public square

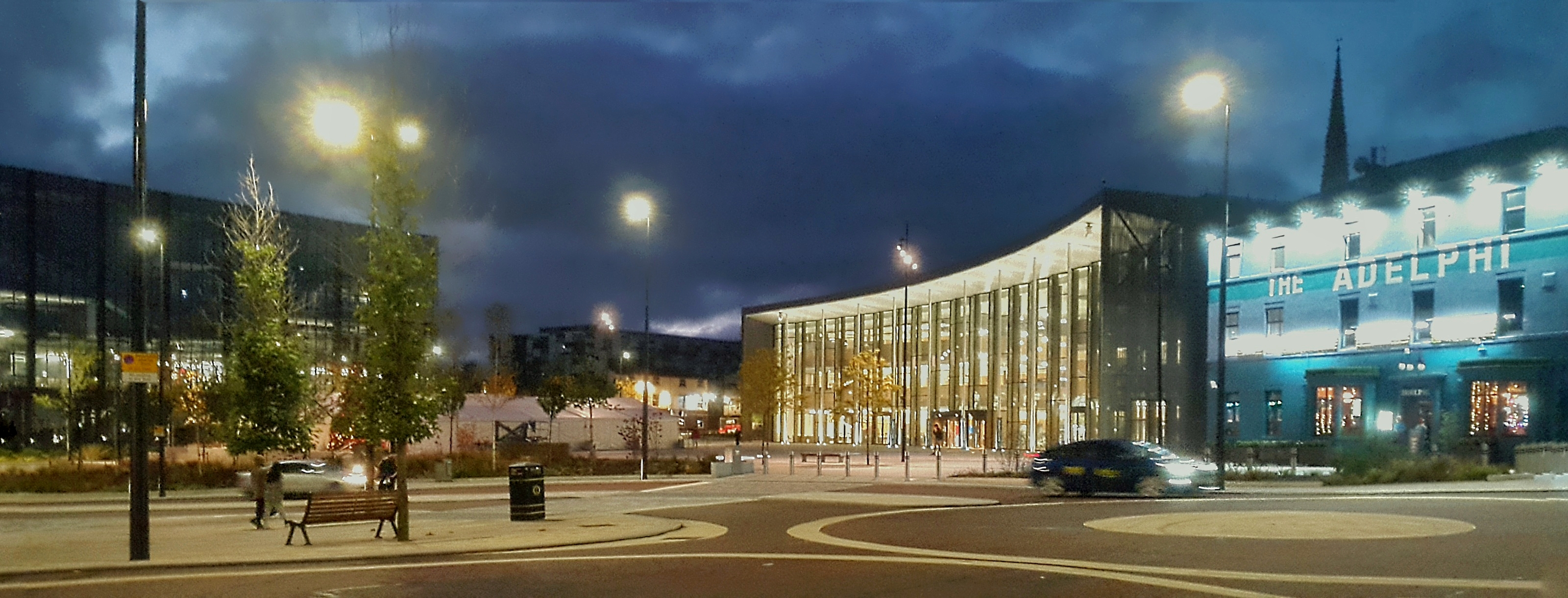
The newly opened Student Centre and University Square

Also under development is the £57 million Student Centre and public square, which will provide a new campus reception building housing several student services, meeting rooms, office space, event venues and a rooftop garden. The new public square, provisionally known as Adelphi Square, will span over 8,400 square metres and will be constructed in front of the new student centre and opposite the EIC, on empty land that was previously the site of the Fylde Building and public land bought by the university from the council. The project has seen the demolition of existing housing in St Peter's Square opposite the University Library and St Peter's Arts Centre, and redevelopment of the A583 and other nearby public roadways, including the Adelphi roundabout, which will result in revised traffic flows. Construction commenced in the third quarter of 2019 and is expected to be completed in 2021. On 30 July 2021 it officially took ownership of the new Student Centre and University Square (which had provisionally been known as Adephi Square) when a ceremonial key was presented to the university's Vice-Chancellor, Professor Graham Baldwin, by the project's major contractor Bowmer + Kirkland. The building became operational in September 2021.

As the university increases in the global rankings, it continues to attract more international students, researchers and Fellows, as well as partnerships with international learning institutions. It is anticipated that further economics benefits from increased foreign investment and business opportunities should entail.

=== Proposed developments ===
An £800 million regeneration project known as the Tithebarn Project was also planned for Preston. The project was originally managed by property giants Grosvenor and Lendlease, Grosvenor withdrew from the project, followed a few years later by Lendlease. The project was dependent upon a number of requirements (such as the re-location of the current bus station, which would cost at least £25million, and be funded largely by the taxpayer). In November 2011, it was announced that John Lewis, which was originally intended to be the major flagship store of the Tithebarn development, had also withdrawn from the project, effectively killing it. The council is now exploring more piecemeal ways of bringing in development and former Labour leader Jeremy Corbyn praises Preston for its "inspiring innovation".

Since city status was awarded in 2002, Preston has been targeted by a number of developers. Residential developments were particularly popular with new apartments planned in and around the city centre. Many of these developments however are still struggling to find buyers for these apartments, and there are rising numbers of repossessions. Office and hotel space is also in demand and a new Central Business District is being planned as well as a number of new hotels.

== Transport ==
=== Railway ===
Railway station
Heritage railway station
Site of former railway station

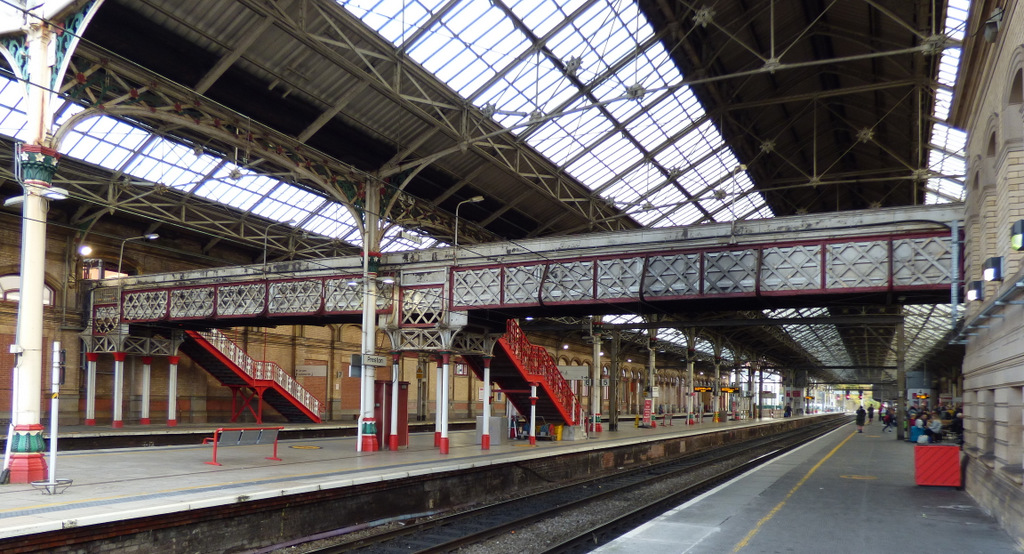
Preston station

Preston railway station is served by four train operating companies on the following routes:

- Avanti West Coast operates inter-city services on the West Coast Main Line to London Euston, Birmingham New Street, Glasgow Central and Edinburgh Waverley
- Northern Trains operates local services to Barrow-in-Furness, Blackburn, Blackpool North & South, Bolton, Bradford Interchange, Carlisle, Lancaster, Leeds, Liverpool Lime Street, Manchester Piccadilly, Manchester Victoria, Wigan North Western, Windermere and York
- TransPennine Express provides regular services between Manchester Airport, Manchester Piccadilly, Carlisle, Glasgow Central and Edinburgh Waverley
- Caledonian Sleeper provides an overnight sleeper service between London Euston, Edinburgh Waverley, Aberdeen, Fort William and Inverness.
- Lumo provides intercity services to London Euston Milton Keynes Central, Nuneaton, Crewe, Carlisle, Lockerbie, Motherwell, Whifflet, Greenfaulds, Larbert & Stirling.

In December 2020, Lancashire County Council approved a proposal to construct a new station in Lea, west of the city, to service new housing estates being built in the area. The proposed station will be located near the site of the former Lea Road station, which closed in 1938. Although a timeline is yet to be established and construction yet to begin, government funding of £22.3 million, along with local funding of £21 million, was conditional that it must be spent by 2023.

=== Roads ===
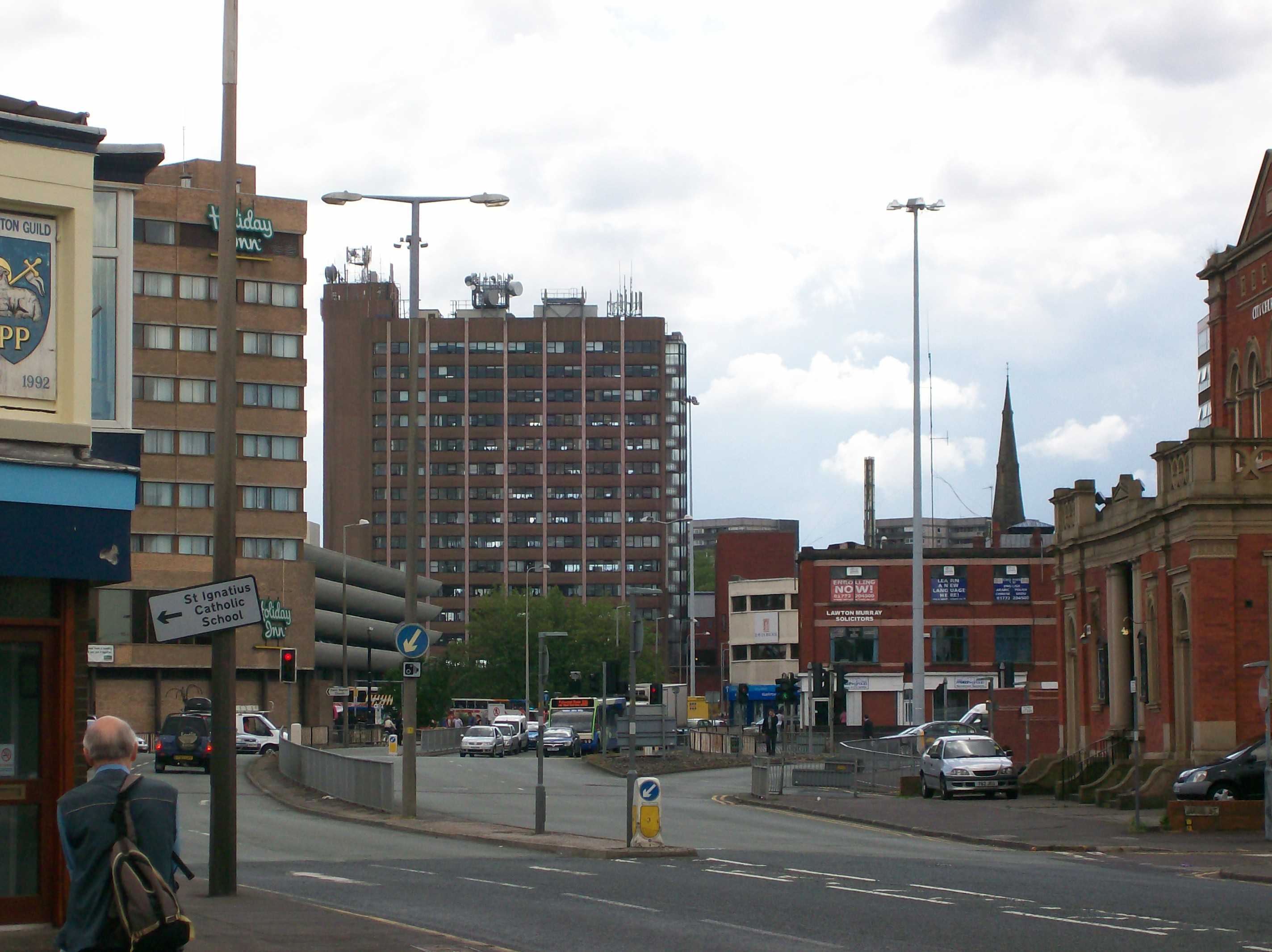
North Road approaches the city centre from the north

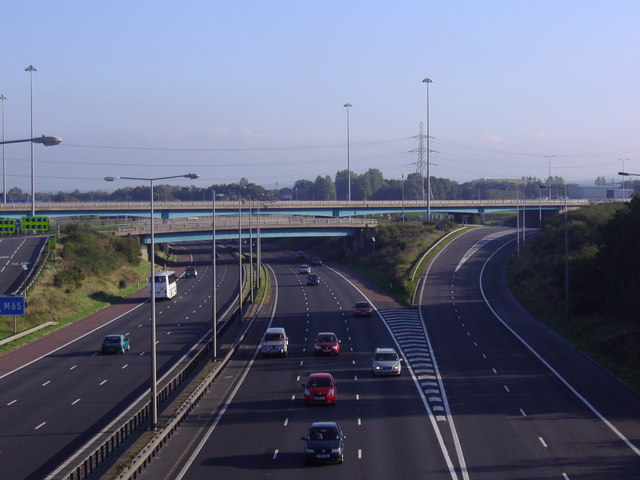
The M6 at junction 29

The Preston By-pass, which opened 5 December 1958, became the first stretch of motorway in the UK and is now part of the M6 with a short section now forming part of the M55. It was built to ease traffic congestion caused by tourists travelling to the popular destinations of Blackpool and the Lake District. The first traffic cones were used during its construction, replacing red lantern paraffin burners.

In the 1980s, a motorway around the west of the city which would have been an extension of the M65 to the M55 was started but never finished. Originally, the M55 had no junction 2 because it was reserved for this new western bypass. Now constructed, it creates a link with the A583, close to the Riversway Docklands; known as the Preston Western Distributor, this alleviates traffic on the M55 and the A6 at the Broughton Interchange to the north of the city. The M6 between junctions 30 and 32 was widened extensively between 1993 and 1995 to compensate. Junction 31A which has only a northbound exit and a southbound entry opened in 1997 to serve a nearby business park.

Motorways terminating close to the city are:

- M55 – Preston to Blackpool, via Kirkham
- M61 – Preston to Manchester, via Chorley and Bolton
- M65 – Preston to Colne, via Blackburn, Accrington and Burnley.

=== Buses ===
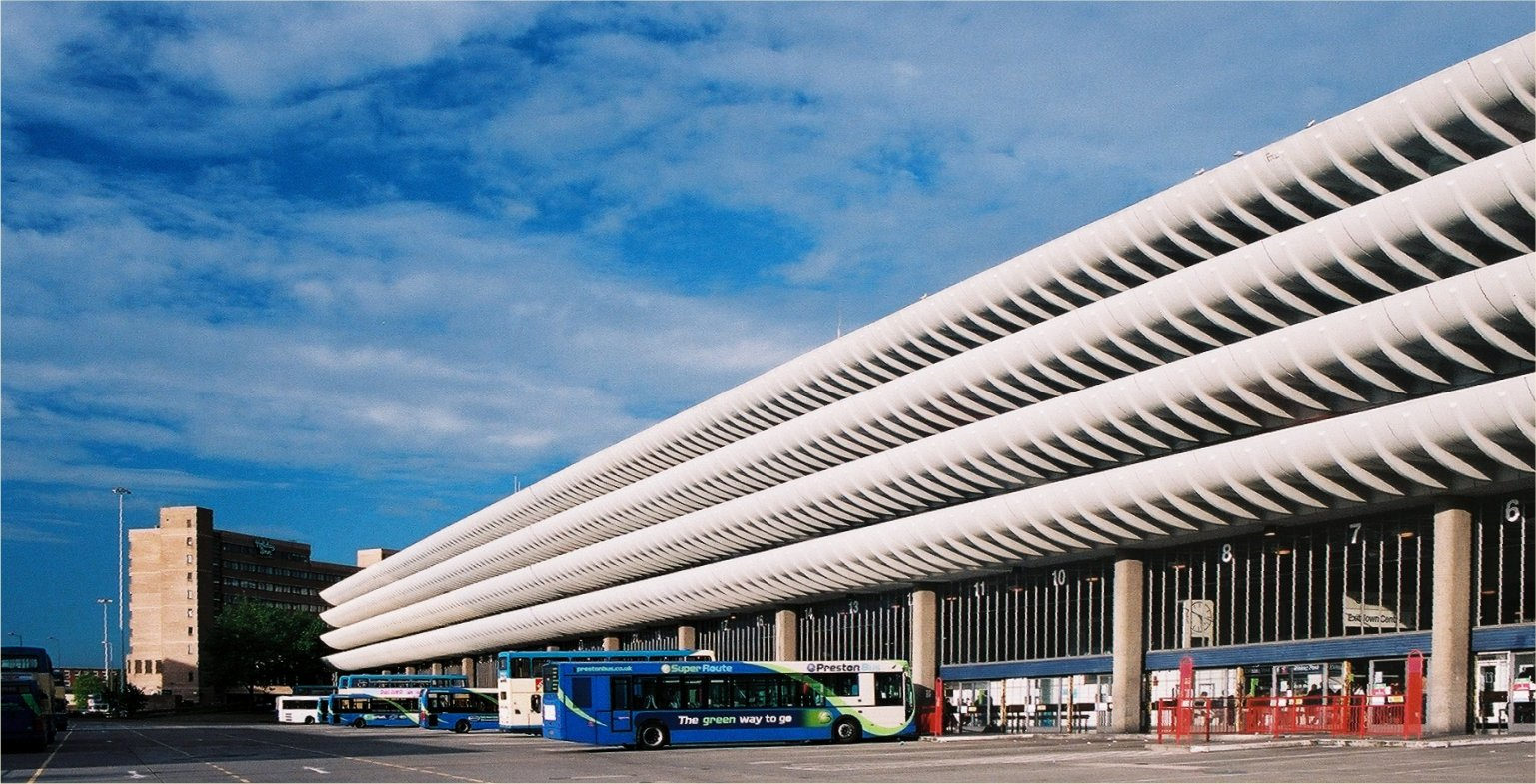
Preston bus station

Local, regional and national bus services operate from Preston bus station, which is located on the south-east edge of the city centre, off the A59 and claimed by some residents to be the largest or second largest station in Europe.

Bus services are operated predominately by Stagecoach Cumbria & North Lancashire, formerly Ribble Motor Services, and Preston Bus, formerly the city's municipal bus company; Vision Bus, Archway Travel and Blackburn Bus Company also operate in and around the city. Key destinations include Blackpool, Blackburn, Bolton, Fleetwood, Lancaster, Liverpool, Manchester, Morecambe, Southport and Wigan.

National Express and Flixbus provide coach services to major cities across Great Britain, including London, Birmingham, Manchester, Glasgow, Edinburgh and Cardiff.

In conjunction with car parking facilities at the bus station, two Park and Ride systems operate. They are located on the outskirts of the city, at Portway in the Riversway area and the other off the A6 at Walton-le-Dale.

Preston was one of the first cities in the UK to have displays fitted to every bus stop, using GPS tracking to provide accurate times and destinations of the next buses arriving.

=== Air ===
Liverpool John Lennon Airport and Manchester Airport are located about 40 miles (64 km) south-west and south-east of the city respectively. Manchester Airport is linked by a direct rail service operated by TransPennine Express. Blackpool Airport lies approximately 16 miles (26 km) to the west of Preston, which provides facilities for private aviation and charter flights.

Although not a public airport, Warton Aerodrome is an active airfield west of the city and is the airfield for the BAE Warton factory.

BAE Samlesbury to the east of the town was an active aerodrome, with a gliding club, but today serves as a facility for BAE Systems and no longer supports flying activities.

=== Water ===
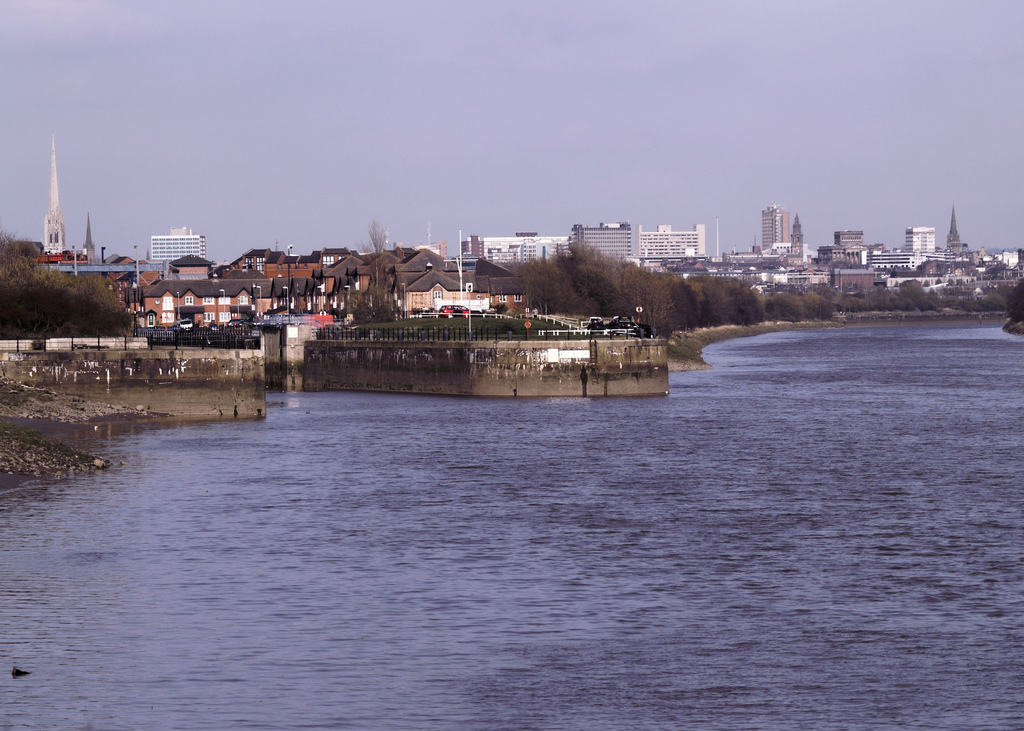
The river Ribble, with the dock entrance to the left

The River Ribble has a length of approximately 75 miles (121 km), originating near the Ribblehead Viaduct in North Yorkshire. It flows westward and passes through Preston, before entering the Irish Sea at the Ribble and Alt Estuaries near Lytham, approximately 11.5 miles (18.5 km) to the west of the city.

Preston Dock was a former maritime dock located on the northern bank of the River Ribble approximately 1.6 mi (2.6 km) west of the city centre. It was the location of the Port of Preston at the Albert Edward Basin which opened in 1892 and is connected to the river by a series of locks. The dock provided a port for shipping and ferry operations until its closure in 1981.

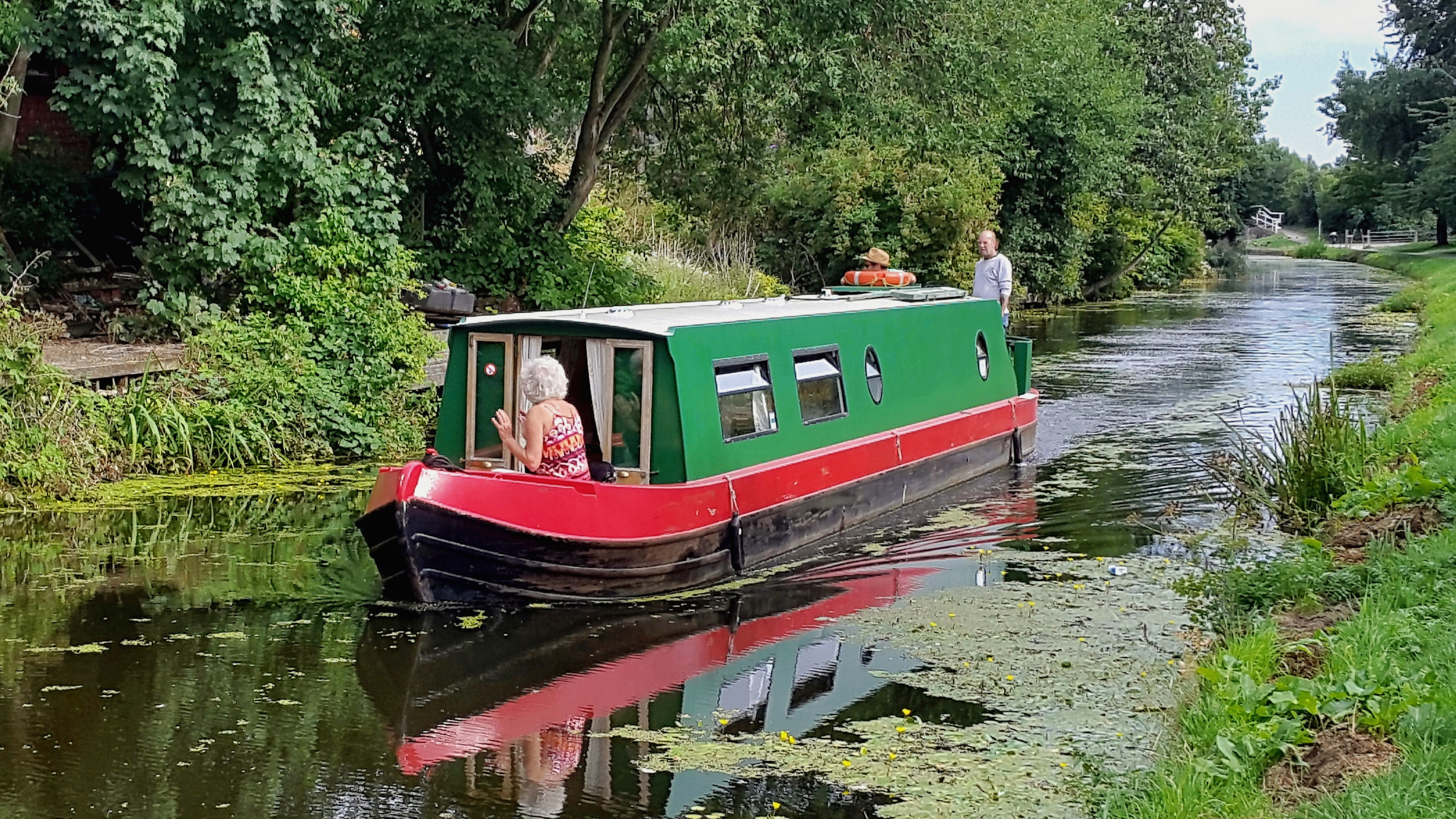
A narrowboat on the Lancaster Canal at Ashton-on-Ribble

The Lancaster Canal runs from Preston to Kendal, Cumbria. It was originally planned to join the Leeds and Liverpool Canal at Westhoughton and while the section north to near Chorley was built, the section south from Preston was never built. Instead, a "temporary" bridge – which still stands today – was constructed over the Ribble near Avenham Park, and a tramway operated from 1803 to Walton Summit.

The canal was originally isolated from the Ribble, but this changed in 2002 with the opening of the Ribble Link. Opened in July 2002, it is a navigation waterway built along a section of the Savick Brook that connects the previously isolated Lancaster Canal to the River Ribble. Featuring a series of locks, the Link allows narrowboats and other small watercraft to transit between the two waterways.

=== Walking and cycling ===
The Guild Wheel is a public footpath and cycle route, created in 2012 in celebration of the Preston Guild and officially opened in August of that year. 21 miles (34 km) in length, it encircles Preston, linking the city to the countryside and surrounding villages. Walking and cycling along the banks of the Lancaster Canal is popular among the city's residents and visitors.

== Education ==
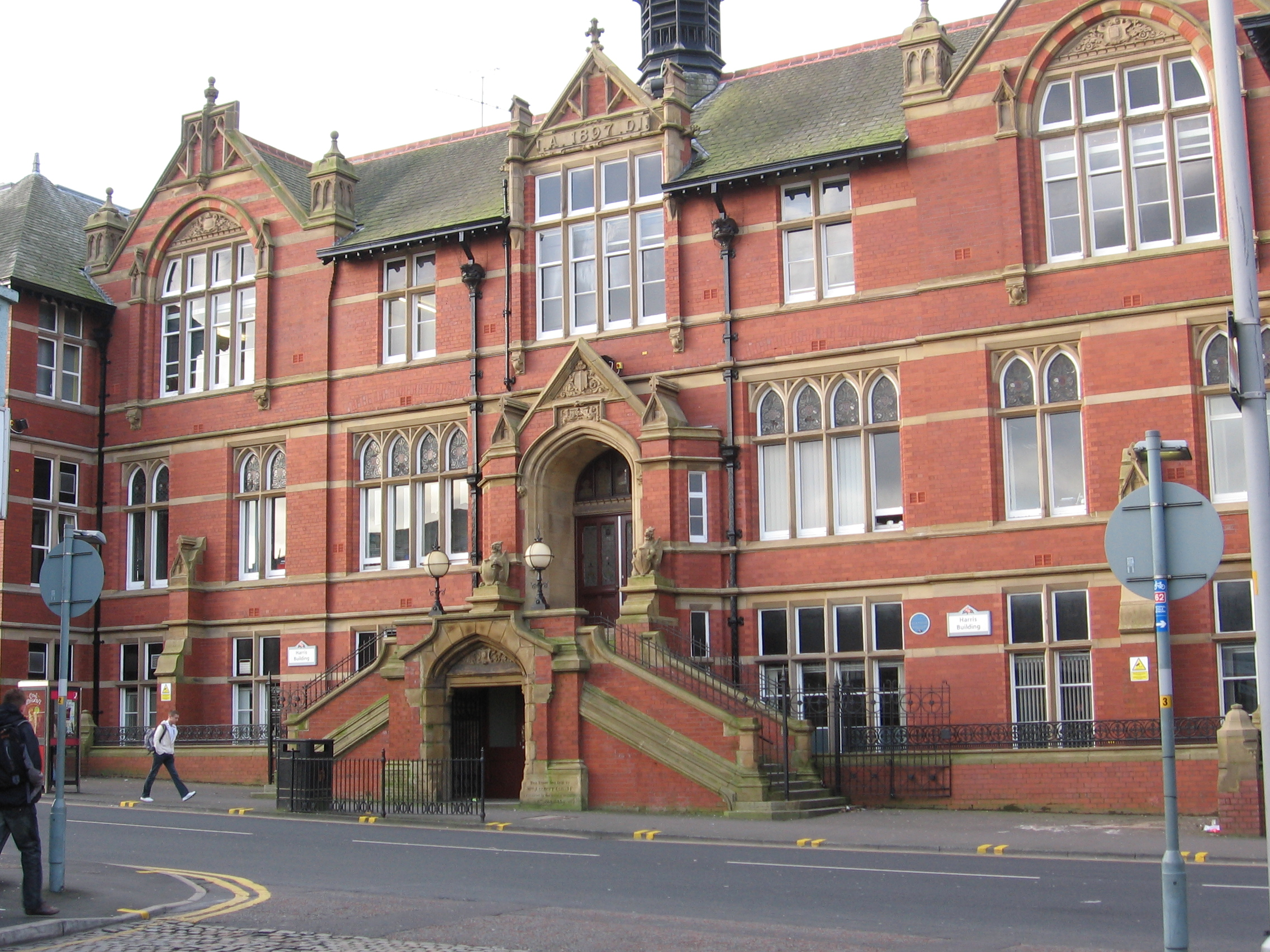
Harris Building, University of Lancashire

The city is home to the University of Lancashire. Formerly known as The Harris Institute, Preston Polytechnic and more recently (1985–1992) as Lancashire Polytechnic, the university was the sixth largest in the country in 2006, with over 33,000 students.

=== Colleges of further and higher education ===
- Lancaster University School of Mathematics - state selective Maths school based in central Preston, near Cardinal Newman College. It focuses on a curriculum of A-levels with all students taking maths and further maths.
- Preston College – based mainly in Fulwood with two campuses – one near the Royal Preston Hospital for A-Levels and vocational courses, and an arts college in Moor Park. It has COVE (Centre of Vocational Excellence) status in retail.
- TUC Education Unit – based at Buckingham House, in the city centre
- Royal Preston Hospital – a teaching hospital, with a proportion of medical students from the University of Manchester based here for their clinical training.
- Cardinal Newman College – based on a single campus in Avenham, close to the city centre.

=== High schools ===
- Archbishop Temple School
- Ashton Community Science College
- Broughton High School
- Christ the King Catholic High School
- Corpus Christi Catholic High School
- Fulwood Academy
- Moor Park High School
- Our Lady's Catholic High School
- Preston Muslim Girls High School
- Eden Boys' School, Preston

== Healthcare ==
Preston has a number of public and private hospitals, including:

- Fulwood Hall Hospital, a private hospital in Fulwood operated by Ramsay Health Care UK, providing a wide range of services
- Greater Lancashire Hospital, a private hospital in Ribbleton operated by Bespoke Health Care Ltd, providing a limited range of services
- Royal Preston Hospital, an NHS general and teaching public hospital at Fulwood.

== Attractions ==
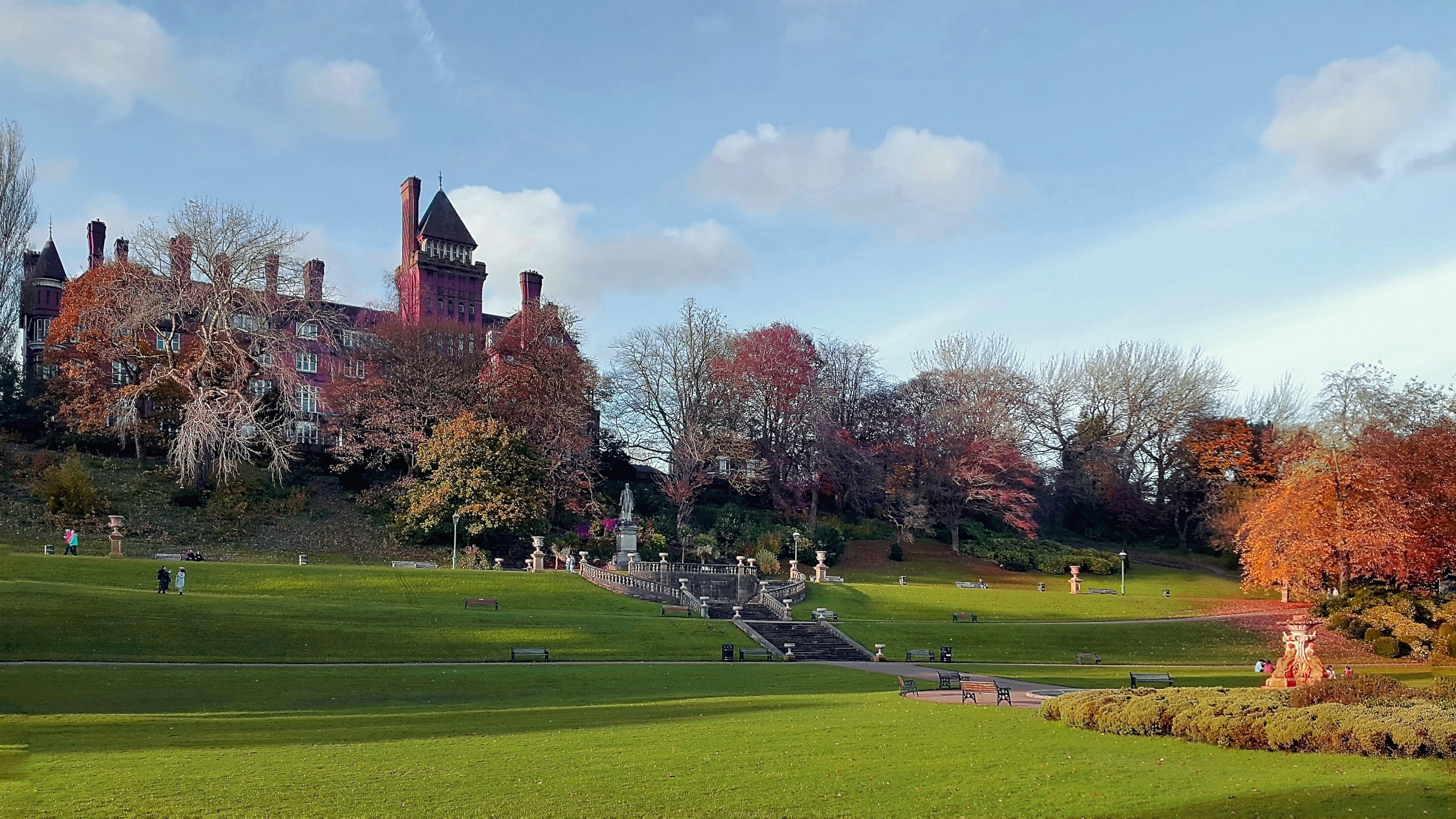
The old Park Hotel overlooking Miller Park in autumn

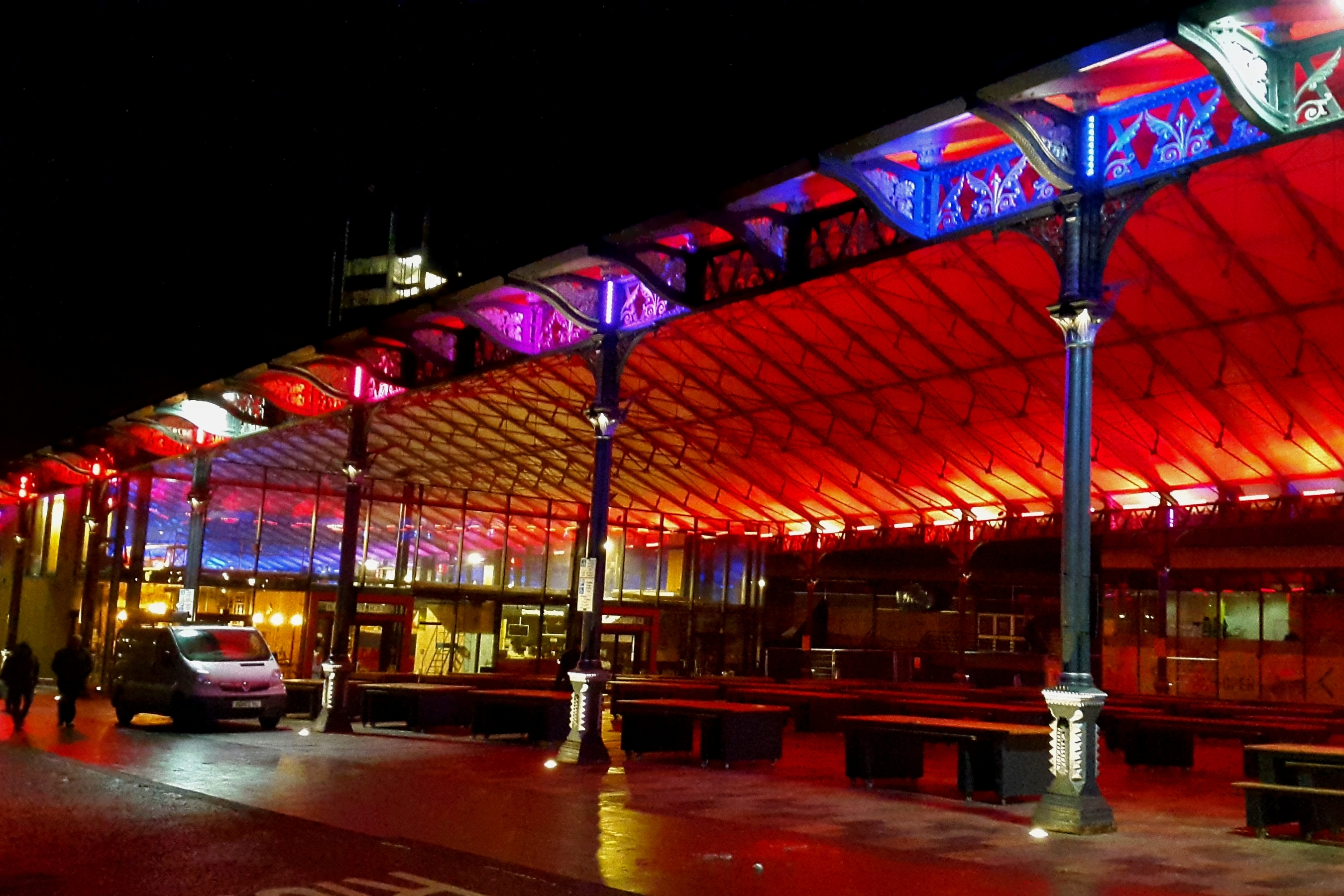
Preston Market Hall and Covered Market at night

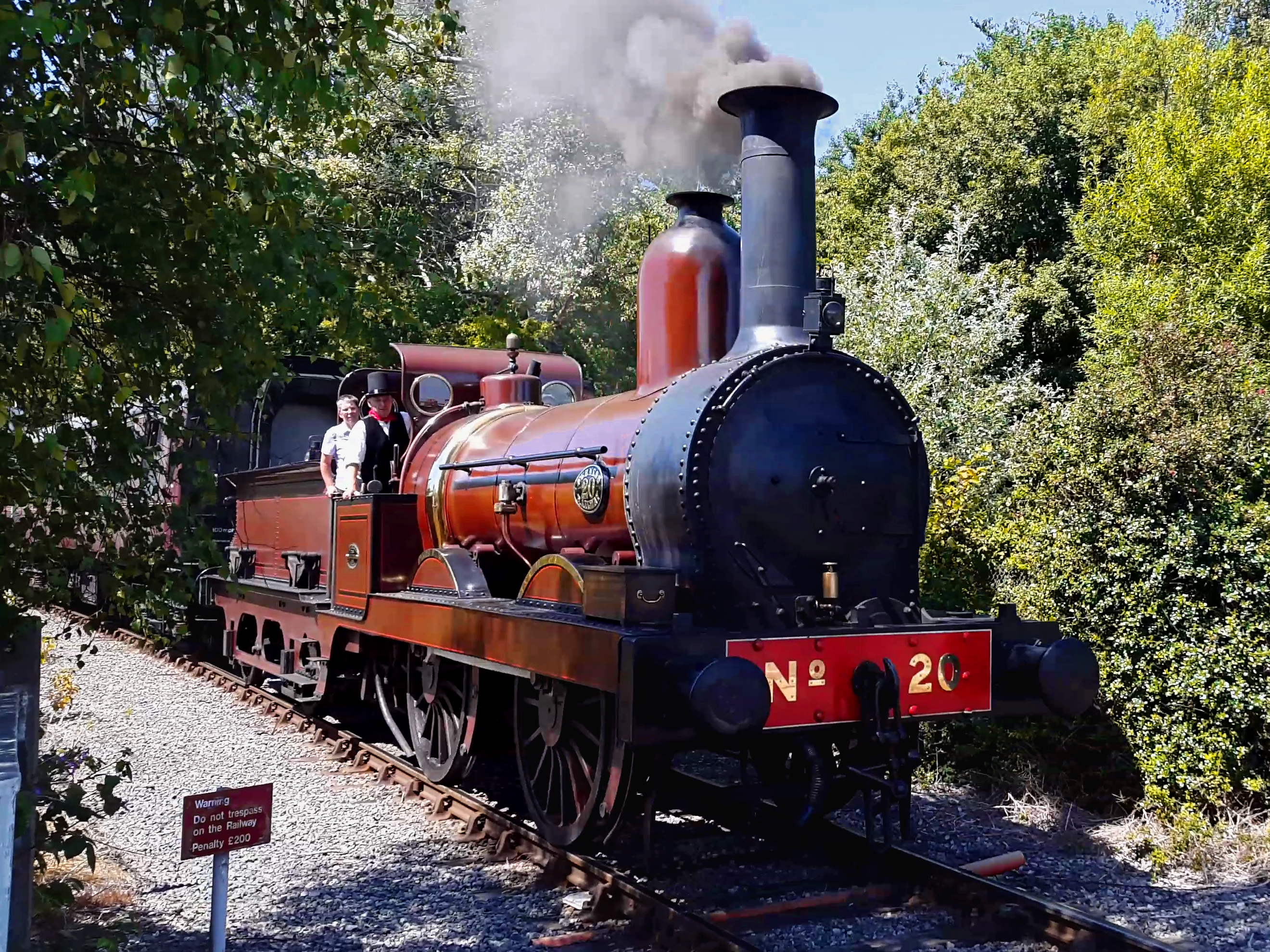
Locomotive no.20, on loan from the National Railway Museum Shildon, operating on the Ribble Steam Railway

Popular attractions around Preston include:

- Avenham and Miller Parks: located a short walk from the centre of the city on the banks of the River Ribble and adjacent to Winckley Square, these large parks rank amongst the finest examples of traditional Victorian parkland in the North West of England.
- The Black Horse public house at 166 Friargate, is on the Campaign for Real Ale's National Inventory of Historic Pub Interiors.
- British Commercial Vehicle Museum located in the nearby town of Leyland, approximately six miles (9.7 km) south of the city, the museum displays antiquarian buses, early fire engines and other historical and commercial vehicles produced by the British manufacturing industry.
- Brockholes is a nature reserve located just off Junction 31 of the M6 Motorway. It is owned by the Lancashire Wildlife Trust and was previously a major quarry excavation site. It provides a wide range of events throughout the year and over 250 acres of trails and hides.
- Deepdale is a football stadium and the home of Preston North End F.C. It is a 15-minute walk from the city centre and located opposite Moor Park. Outside the Sir Tom Finney Stand is The Splash statue of the famous player which was inspired by a photograph taken in 1956.
- Harris Museum, Art Gallery & Preston Free Public Library: located in the city centre, the museum has collections on archaeology and local history; also fine art including decorative art, costume, and textiles, with a focus on local works.
- Lancashire Infantry Museum: located at Fulwood Barracks, the museum claims to be the "largest Regimental archive and the premier centre for military historical research in the North of England."
- Lancaster Canal: from its terminus and boat basin at Ashton-on-Ribble the canal provides narrowboat cruising and a scenic cycle path and walk (approximately 22 miles) to Lancaster and destinations north.
- Museum of Lancashire: located a short walk from Preston bus station, the museum hosts historical collections on the theme of "Lancashire Through Time". On 30 September 2016 the museum closed to the general public due to council budget cuts. In July 2019 Lancashire County Council stated it was their "ultimate ambition" for the museum to reopen.
- Preston Market Hall and Box Market: located on the site of the historic Covered Market and Fishmarket, traders sell local fresh produce, hot and cold foods to dine-in or take-away, artesan beer and coffee, gifts and bric-à-brac. Open Monday-Saturday.
- Preston Minster, a grade II* building, dating from at least 1094, although most of it was rebuilt in the nineteenth century; it is the parish church of Preston and is united to the Church of St George, both of which are located in city centre.
- Ribble Steam Railway: a preserved railway running along Preston Dock, the museum includes workshops (where preservation work is undertaken), a visitor centre and cafe, and offers rides on restored steam trains on operating weekends.
- St Walburge's Church: located about a 15–20 minute walk from Preston Railway Station, free guided tours are available around midday on Saturdays. At certain times of the year, tours of the spire (the tallest in England for a church that is not a cathedral) are available; tickets are limited and are available from the church in return for a recommended donation.

== Culture ==
In September 2024, Moor Park in the city was the venue for Radio 2 in the Park, with guest artists including Sting, Sister Sledge, Manic Street Preachers and the Pet Shop Boys.

== Traditions and folklore ==
=== Leaping the Colt Hole ===
A former civic custom in Preston was known as “leaping the Colt Hole”. It took place on Collop Monday, when the Corporation perambulated the borough boundaries. The Colt Hole was a large water-filled ditch on Preston Marsh, and newly elected freemen or bailiffs, known as “Colts”, were expected to leap it. Joseph Livesey recalled that substitutes could be hired to make the attempt. In 1832 Annie Milner described the newly elected burgess being taken to the widest part of the ditch, while spectators also risked being pushed into the water. She recorded a tradition that the custom commemorated a king who had fallen into the ditch while hunting. Anthony Hewitson later wrote that a substitute received 2s. 6d. if he fell in and 5s. if he cleared the ditch. Joseph Livesey recalled that on Collop Monday the leaping of the Colt Hole was followed by further horseplay. At Water Lane End, coppers were thrown into dirty water for boys to scramble after; heated pennies were thrown from the Castle Inn; and newly elected “Colts” were made to run around a pump in Lord Street while the crowd struck them with hands, hats or other convenient objects.

=== Boggarts ===
A long-standing supernatural tradition was the Bannister Hall Doll, a boggart associated with Bannister Hall at Higher Walton. Joseph Livesey recalled that local children in the early nineteenth century believed in its exploits. An 1853 account described the apparition as a headless woman who wandered the lanes and streets of Preston, could take the form of a large black dog, and was sometimes heard rattling chains.

=== Touching for the King's Evil ===
In the late seventeenth century, Preston Corporation gave financial assistance to townspeople seeking the royal touch, which was believed to cure scrofula or the “King's Evil”. In 1682 the bailiffs were ordered to give a local bricklayer 10 shillings towards taking his son to London to be touched by Charles II. In 1687, when James II was at Chester, the council granted five shillings each to two local sufferers to travel there for the same purpose.

== Media ==
The following regional radio stations include Preston within their coverage:

- BBC Radio Lancashire – Lancashire wide, news, talk, sport and music. (Broadcast from Blackburn)
- Greatest Hits Radio Lancashire – Lancashire and North West England, classic hits. (Broadcast from Manchester)
- Hits Radio Lancashire – Lancashire and North West England, pop music. (Broadcast from Manchester)
- Heart North West – across the North West, pop music. (Broadcast from Manchester)
- Smooth North West – across the North West, easy-listening music. (Broadcast from Manchester)
- Capital Manchester and Lancashire – across the North West, pop music. (Broadcast from Manchester)
- Central Radio North West – across The Fylde, Leyland and Chorley areas of Lancashire, news, talk, and music. (Broadcast from the city)

The Lancashire Evening Post newspaper is based in Fulwood.

Blog Preston is a hyperlocal news website which provides community news, views and information about the city.

Television is provided by ITV Granada, BBC North West and a local TV service for Blackpool and Preston, That's Lancashire, from studios at the Northern Lights Business Centre in the University of Central Lancashire's Media Factory building.

VisitPreston.com is a website that "showcases everything that Preston has to offer to all audiences", providing information on topics such as business investment, education, tourism, etc. It is provided by key local stakeholders including the Preston City Council, Lancashire County Council, University of Central Lancashire, Preston Business Improvement District, and The Chase creative consultants.

== Sport ==
=== Preston North End F.C. ===
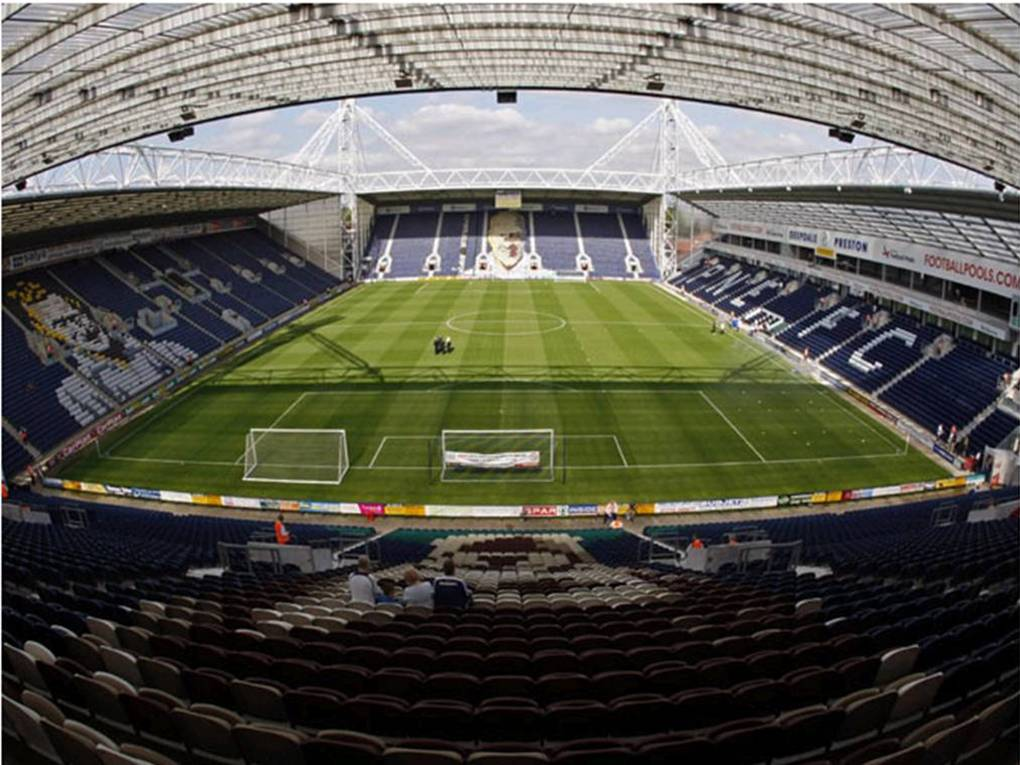
Deepdale Stadium, home of Preston North End F.C.

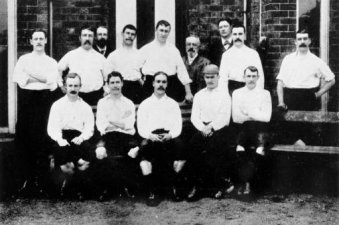
Preston North End in 1888–89, the first Football League champions, subsequently doing The Double

Preston North End F.C. were one of the founder members of the Football League and the first team to be crowned English football champions. They play at Deepdale Football Ground which was also the original site of the National Football Museum. The museum closed in 2011 in preparation for its move to Manchester due to funding issues.

Preston were champions of the Football League in its first two seasons, but have not won it since. Their last major trophy came in 1938 when they won the FA Cup, and they have not played top division football since 1961. They are one of the few English league clubs to have been champions of all four tiers of the English professional league.

Dick, Kerr's Ladies, one of the successful early women's football teams in Britain, called Preston home, starting in 1917. They were one of the first ladies teams to play an international match against an overseas side when they played against a team from Paris in the spring of 1920. They played a series of matches in the north west of England, and at Stamford Bridge, London. The opening match of the tour was played at Deepdale, the home of Preston North End, in front of 25,000 spectators, a record for the ground at that time.

=== UCLan Sports Arena ===
The UCLan Sports Arena is the University of Central Lancashire's multi-million pound sporting venue, catering for a wide range of outdoor sports such as football, rugby, athletics, hockey, tennis, netball and cycling on a 64-acre site. Open to students and the wider community, the arena is the city's premier multi-sports venue.

The arena is located in Lea, approximately two miles from the university's main campus in Preston. A shuttle bus operates for students on Monday-Saturdays from outside the UCLAN Students' Union building in Fylde Road. As well as being the home of a number of university sporting clubs, the arena also hosts various public sporting clubs including the Preston Harriers Athletics Club and the Preston Springsfields Tennis Club.

The arena has a 0.6 miles (1 km) cycle track and a 0.5 miles (0.8 km) junior cycle track, open for use by individuals, clubs and cycle races/meetings. It is often used for cycle racing by the university's cycling club, as well as local and regional events and at such times is closed to general users.

=== Golf ===
Preston has two golf clubs with 18-hole courses, these are:

- Ashton and Lea Golf Club, in Lea in the west of the city
- Preston Golf Club, in Fulwood in the north of Preston.

The clubs operate on a membership basis, and usually allow playing and non-playing visitors. They also provide further facilities such as function rooms and pro shops.

The Ingol Village Golf Club operated in Ingol in Preston's northwest from 1981 until its closure in 2017, when it was deemed nonviable due to dwindling membership.

=== Other sports ===
Speedway racing, then known as Dirt Track Racing was staged at Farringdon Park in the late 1920s and early 1930s. The Preston team raced in the English Dirt Track League of 1929 and the Northern League of 1930 and 1931. The best known rider of the team was Joe "Iron Man" Abbott who went on to Test Match successes riding before the war for Belle Vue. After the war Joe appeared for Harringay and Bradford.

Preston is home to many other sports leagues and clubs.

- Rugby union: Preston Grasshoppers R.F.C., established in 1869, play in the Northern Premier League, the fifth tier of the English league system.
- Cricket: Preston Cricket Club, founded in 1882 and based at West Cliff, compete in the Northern Premier Cricket League. Many other cricket clubs including Fulwood and Broughton Cricket Club are based in Preston, with many competing in locally based competitions such as the Palace Shield.
- Hockey: Preston Hockey Club was established in 1903.
- Mountaineering: Preston Mountaineering Club is based in the town and has been in existence for over 70 years.
- Roller derby: Preston is also home to Lancashire's first roller derby league; Preston Roller Girls, have been playing since 2011.

== Notable people ==
- Sir Richard Arkwright (1732–1792), born in Preston and developed his water frame in the building now known as Arkwright House. A Blue Plaque commemorates the location at Stoneygate
- Fiona Armstrong, Lady MacGregor (born 1956), journalist, author and Lord Lieutenant of Dumfries.
- Ann Baynard (1672–1697), a natural philosopher and model of piety.
- Leo Baxendale (1930–2017), cartoonist who drew the comic characters Dennis the Menace, the Bash Street Kids and Minnie the Minx for The Beano was born in Whittle-le-Woods near Preston and educated at Preston Catholic College.
- Eddie Calvert (1922–1978), trumpeter, greatest success from 1953 to 1958; known as the "Man with the Golden Trumpet".
- Laurence Clarkson (1615–1667), an English theologian and accused heretic.
- Joseph Delaney (1945–2022), author of science fiction and fantasy books
- William Dobson (1820–1884), journalist and antiquary.
- Tupele Dorgu (born 1977), actress famous for her role as Kelly Crabtree in the British ITV soap-opera Coronation Street
- Anulka Dziubinska (born 1950), model and actress, Playboy centrefold in May 1973; now a florist in Los Angeles
- Tim Farron (born 1970), MP for Westmorland and Lonsdale and former Leader of the Liberal Democrats
- Benjamin Franklin (1706–1790), one of the Founding Fathers of the United States, lived briefly on Friargate before returning to America; a Blue Plaque on the wall of the building commemorates the location
- John Eldon Gorst (1835–1916), a lawyer and politician.
- Phil Ellis (born 1981), an award-winning stand-up comedian and series 20 Taskmaster contestant
- Lieutenant-General Sir John Bagot Glubb, (1897–1986), known as Glubb Pasha, a British military officer, scholar and author
- Sir George Grenfell-Baines (1908–2003), an architect and town planner, who founded the Building Design Partnership.
- Thomas Shuttleworth Grimshawe (1778–1850), biographer, Anglican priest and five times mayor of Preston.
- Edmund Robert Harris (ca.1804–1877), local solicitor, the principal benefactor of the Harris Museum, Harris Institute or Art School, Harris Technical School and the Harris Orphanage. A Blue Plaque is located at his former home at 13 Ribblesdale Place
- A. J. Hartley (born 1964), award-winning, bestselling novelist
- Lubaina Himid (born 1954), Turner Prize-winning artist; professor of Contemporary Art at the University of Central Lancashire
- Susan Hanson (born 1943), actress, played Diane Hunter (aka Miss Diane) in the ITV soap opera Crossroads, from 1965 to 1987
- Mary Anne Hobbs (born 1964), English BBC Radio One DJ and music journalist
- Mary Holt (1924–2021), MP for Preston North, the first woman to hold the seat; qualified barrister, and judge on the Northern Circuit.
- William Thomas Hughes (1946-1977), prison escapee and mass murderer
- William Adam Hulton (1802–1887), lawyer and antiquarian.
- John Inman (1935–2007), actor, famous for his role as Mr. Humphries in Are You Being Served?
- Anne Jessopp (born 1963), first female CEO of the Royal Mint
- Sarah Ann Kennedy, voice of Miss Rabbit in Peppa Pig and Nanny Plum in Ben and Holly's Little Kingdom, works at the University of Central Lancashire as a lecturer in animation
- Ian Kirkham (born 1963), saxophone player for the group Simply Red, grew up locally
- Joseph Livesey (1794–1884), a temperance campaigner, local politician, newspaper proprietor and philanthropist, a Blue Plaque commemorating him is located on Stoneygate
- Dan Nightingale (born 1981), comedian and podcaster
- John Boyle O'Reilly (1844–1890), Irish writer, journalist and civil rights activist lived in Preston from 1859 to 1863 with his family while he worked at the Preston Guardian.
- Nick Park (born 1958), filmmaker, animator and creator of Wallace and Gromit was awarded the Freedom of the City in 1997. There is a bronze statue of the two animated characters by the entrance to the Preston Market Hall in the city centre.
- Dame Karen Elizabeth Pierce, Lady Roxburgh (born 1959), British diplomat and British Ambassador to the United States at the Foreign, Commonwealth and Development Office, attended Penwortham Girls' High School
- Edith Rigby (1872–1950), English suffragette, there is a Blue Plaque commemorating her at a former home
- Robert W. Service (1874–1958), poet and writer associated with the Yukon Gold Rush; there is a Blue Plaque commemorating him near the railway station
- Ranvir Singh (born 1977), TV presenter, newsreader and Chancellor of the University of Central Lancashire
- Howard Stableford (born 1959), radio and TV broadcaster, presented the BBC's Tomorrow's World; attended Hutton Grammar School
- Francis Thompson (1859–1907), Victorian poet and ascetic, born in Winckley Street, Preston where there is a memorial plaque
- William Turner (1714–1794), dissenting minister, liberal in theology, supported rational dissent.
- Jordan North (Born 1990) Capital Breakfast host

=== Sport ===
- Stu Bennett (born 1980), WWE wrestler, lived in Preston until the age of six
- Holly Bradshaw (born 1991), Great Britain Olympic track and field athlete
- Clarke Carlisle (born 1979), footballer, played 470 games and TV personality
- Hugh Carthy (born 1994), Pro Peloton cyclist EF Pro Cycling
- Helen Clitheroe (born 1974), Great Britain Olympic athlete, middle and long-distance runner.
- Sir Tom Finney (1922–2014), footballer, played 433 games for Preston North End and 76 for England. He was awarded the Freedom of the City in 1979
- Andrew 'Freddie' Flintoff (born 1977), England and Lancashire cricketer as well as a current broadcaster. He was awarded the Freedom of the City in 2006 following England's Ashes victory of 2005.
- Phil Jones (born 1992), footballer who played 204 games mainly for Manchester United and 27 for England
- Stacey Kemp (born 1988), former Great Britain competitive pair skater
- Simon Kerrigan (born 1989), cricketer, played 125 first class games
- Mark Lawrenson (born 1957), TV presenter, footballer and pundit was born in Penwortham, just south of the city centre; he played 488 games, mainly for Liverpool and 39 for the Republic of Ireland
- Steve Walsh (born 1964), footballer played 581 games including 449 for Leicester City.

== Twin cities/towns ==
Preston is twinned with:

- Almelo, Netherlands; twinned in 1948
- Kalisz, Poland; twinned in 1989
- Nîmes, France; twinned in 1955
- Recklinghausen, Germany; twinned in 1956.
