= Douglas Navigation =

Coordinates: 53.5837°N 2.7458°W

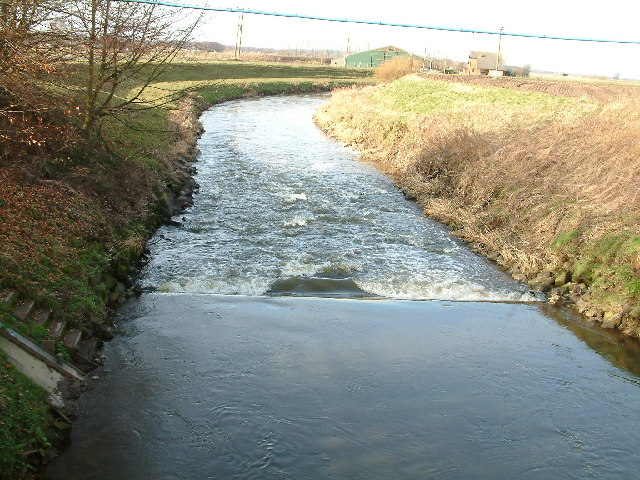
- The river from Wanes Blades bridge, between Parbold and Rufford
- Interactive map of Douglas Navigation

Specifications
- Locks: 13
- Status: Reverted to river

History
- Original owner: Douglas Navigation Company
- Date of act: 1720
- Date completed: 1742
- Date closed: 1801

Geography
- Start point: Wigan
- End point: River Ribble
- Branch: Rufford Branch
- Branch of: Leeds and Liverpool Canal

The Douglas Navigation was a canalised section of the River Douglas or Asland, in Lancashire, England, running from its confluence with the River Ribble to Wigan. It was authorised in 1720, and some work was carried out, but the undertakers lost most of the share money speculating on the South Sea Bubble. Alexander Leigh attempted to revive it eleven years later, and opened it progressively between 1738 and 1742. Leigh began work on a parallel canal called Leigh's Cut to improve the passage from Newburgh to Gathurst, but progress was slow and it was unfinished in 1771.

The working life of the navigation was short, as it was bought out by the Leeds and Liverpool Canal Company in 1772, to prevent a rival scheme to build a canal from Liverpool to Wigan. The canal company could not really afford the purchase price, but needed to secure the water supply to prevent the rival scheme from using it. The Leeds and Liverpool completed Leigh's Cut, built locks to enable sailing boats on the river to avoid having to pass under the aqueduct which carried the canal over the river at Newburgh, and improved the upper river into Wigan in time for a formal opening in October 1774. The final 3 miles (4.8 km) of river section into Wigan was replaced by a parallel canal, completed in 1780, and the lower river was superseded by the Rufford Branch, opened in 1781.

The navigation was not a financial success, but most of the investors had interests in coal mines, and improvements to the river enabled them to get their coal to wider markets. Leigh in particular continued to invest in the navigation until its takeover, presumably using profits from his coal interests. The navigation was abandoned by 1801, but because the canal company had not been able to buy all the original shares, the new cuts were known as the Upper and Lower Douglas Navigations, and were accounted for separately, until the final two shares were purchased in 1893. Thus on paper the Douglas Navigation lasted for 173 years, and a small part of it remains, as to build the Rufford Branch, the river was diverted into a new channel, and the old channel reused by the canal. Sollom Lock can still be seen on this section, although it no longer has any gates. Some 4 miles (6.4 km) of the tidal river are in use below Tarleton Lock, and this section has been increasingly used since 2002, when the Ribble Link opened, connecting the Lancaster Canal to the River Ribble.

== History ==
Cannel coal, which burns with a bright yellow flame, producing little ash, was being mined in the Wigan coalfield, and there was an increasing market for coal around the edges of the Irish Sea, but the industry was hampered by the lack of an efficient way to transport the coal to the coast. The roads were primitive, but the River Douglas ran from Wigan to the River Ribble below Tarleton, and in the early 18th century, there was growing interest in making it into a navigation.

In 1712, Thomas Steers, a civil engineer and surveyor who had arrived in Liverpool in 1710 to work on building the docks, surveyed the Douglas and recommended that it be made accessible to ships, enabling the transport of coal from the coalfields around Wigan down to the Ribble, and onwards to Preston. It is not clear who employed him, but it may have been Sir Roger Bradshaigh, who owned land on which coal could be mined around Wigan, and who presented a bill to the House of Commons on 10 April 1713. The bill was supported by petitions from Justices of the Peace and Gentlemen from the County palatine of Lancaster, who saw the potential for improved manufacturing and communications. Steers had proposed seven locks to negotiate the rise of 75 feet (23 m) from the mouth of the river at Hesketh Bank to Wild Mill in Wigan. Although the bill passed through the House of Commons successfully, some local landowners objected, and the bill was defeated in the House of Lords. A series of pamphlets were produced in an attempt to sway local opinion, and with the support of Wigan Corporation, another bill was presented. Again there was opposition, but the bill was passed, and the canalisation of the river from its junction with the River Ribble to Miry Lane End in Wigan was authorised by Parliament on 7 April 1720, with Steers and William Squire, Esq. of Liverpool as the two proprietors. They were given 11 years to complete the work, and could charge tolls on all goods carried, except for manure, which could not be charged. Commissioners were appointed, who could engage new proprietors if Steers and Squire failed to finish the task.

In order to fund the scheme, Steers and Squire, assisted by Squire's brother-in-law Richard Norris, divided the expected profits into four, allocated themselves one portion each, and split the remaining portion in 1,200 parts, which they hoped to sell for £5 each. This would in theory raise £6,000, but it is unclear how many shares were actually sold, though it was at least 942, which would have raised £4,170. Steers began work, replacing the ford at Rufford with a bridge and building the first lock using stone from quarries at Harrock Hill and Bartons Delf, both locations fairly close to Rufford. the channel downstream from there was made straighter and wider for about 1.5 miles (2.4 km) to where work began on the lowest lock at Croston Finney. A boat was constructed, that allowed Steers to trade on the river, and he stated that he had spent £700 on the work carried out, but that Squire had only given him £600.

1720 was the time of the South Sea Bubble, a boom in the stock exchange, and Squire had stayed in London after the Act was obtained to raise the finance, but is believed to have lost most of the money he raised by speculating on the South Sea Bubble. The bubble burst two months after the shares had been issued, and with no finance, work ground to a halt. Steers, Squire and Norris eventually ended up in court, charged with fraud. All denied any wrongdoing, with Steers describing how he had bought land, stone and timber, constructed the lock, and been carrying goods along a 5-mile (8 km) section of the river. The case rumbled on from 1729 to 1734, with Squire disappearing around 1730, but the Court of Chancery failed to reach a conclusion as to whether the men had deliberately set out to defraud shareholders of their money.

=== Completion ===
Although the landowners had originally resisted the scheme, and the eleven years to complete it had passed, in 1731 Alexander Leigh of Hindley Hall, Wigan and Alexander Radcliffe of Ormskirk negotiated with the commissioners that they should become the new undertakers for the scheme. Agreement was reached on 12 June 1731, and they were granted a further eleven years to complete the project. They asked William Palmer, who was working on improvements to the River Ouse Navigation for the Corporation of York, to make a new survey, which he duly did. His report was delivered in March 1733, and indicated that the work would cost £6,685, and would require 12 locks. The total rise was 68 feet (21 m), each lock would be 60 by 12 feet (18.3 by 3.7 m), and the depth of the navigation would be 3 feet (0.91 m). He identified a problem with the original plans, as the tide lock would not accessible except for a couple of days either side of spring tides. He therefore proposed creating a new cut from Rufford to Crossens, near Southport, crossing Martin Mere. This additional work would cost £2,530, but would have the advantage that the tidal range at Crossens would enable boats to reach the navigation more easily, the route would be 6 miles (9.7 km) shorter, and it would offer better flood protection the land above Rufford, as there would be two channels for flood water to reach the sea. No further action was taken until 1737, when Radcliffe died. Leigh became the major shareholder for the scheme, and was joined by Robert Holt of Wigan.

The two men set to work, and opened four locks in 1738, and another three in 1739. In 1738, the commissioners made a contract with a colliery owner to deliver 800,000 baskets of coal. Holt and Leigh consulted Steers occasionally, paying him for advice on the basin in Wigan and Crooke Lock. The main contractor was Richard Fell, who was paid for all sorts of work, while other contractors were engaged for specific tasks. Holt died in 1740 and did not live to see the project completed, but an inspection was made by the commissioners on 12 June 1742, eleven years to the day since Leigh took over, The navigation was declared to be complete. An estimated £7,000 had been spent on this second phase of work, and another £1,000 on a fleet of boats.

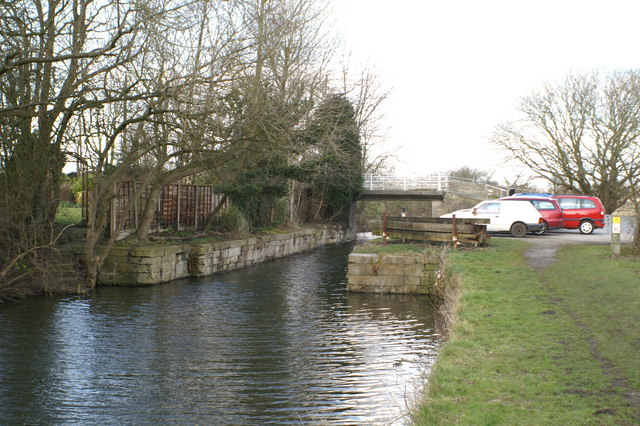
Sollom Lock was originally the end of the Douglas Navigation, but the route was re-used by the Leeds and Liverpool Canal Rufford Branch. It has no gates.

Canalisation of the river involved the construction of a number of locks, with a basin at Miry Lane End, in Wigan, which was connected to the river by a short artificial channel. Hadfield states that there were eight locks, all of which were upstream of Newburgh. Clarke, however, lists thirteen, eight of which were above Newburgh, with five more below it. To improve access to the navigation, a new lock was constructed further downstream at Tarleton, but there were complaints that it caused flooding, and it had been abandoned by 1770. As the navigation had fixed bridges, sailing boats needed to be able to lower their masts, and this prevented sea-going boats, called flats, from using the navigation, as they required the extra rigidity of a fixed mast. In the early 1760s, a new cut was built between Sollom and Rufford, and fixed bridges began to be replaced by swing bridges. A new lock at Sollom was a little further downstream than that at Crostons Finney, resulting in access to the navigation being possible on more days each month. Man power was used to tow the boats, but in 1800 land for a towpath between Sollom and Rufford was bought. Plans to make the whole length navigable by fixed-mast boats were dropped when the Leeds and Liverpool Canal became interested in the navigation.

Improvements to the river below Gathurst Bridge had begun in 1753, when Leigh started working on a cut to bypass the river from Gathurst to Newburgh, known as "Leigh's Cut". For whatever reason, progress was slow, and the cut was still unfinished in 1771. The main traffic was coal from Wigan, with north Lancashire limestone and Westmorland slate travelling in the opposite direction.

=== Takeover ===
The Leeds and Liverpool Canal had been authorised by an Act of Parliament on 19 May 1770, with the main opposition coming from the Douglas Navigation. However, they were chiefly concerned with protecting their water supply, and ensuring that the aqueduct to carry the canal over the navigation at Newburgh, near Parbold, would not impede the progress of fixed-masted boats. Leigh's son, Holt Leigh, had been talking to the canal committee since October 1769, to work out a solution. A branch canal would link the canal to the river upstream of the aqueduct, and locks would link them downstream. This would sailing boats to lock up into the canal and cross over the aqueduct rather than pass beneath it. The Leeds and Liverpool would pay £500 in compensation once the work was complete. The Canal Company built the canal in sections, and the first recorded use of boats was on 25 July 1771, on the section from Newburgh to Liverpool. Water supply was a problem, as the act of Parliament prohibited extraction from the River Douglas. At the time, Alexander Leigh held 29 of the 36 shares in the navigation, and offered to sell them for £14,500 to the Leeds and Liverpool in November 1771. Although they could not really afford the price, they bought them anyway, as they were fighting a new scheme for a Liverpool Canal, which would have connected directly to Wigan. The Liverpool Canal bill was presented to Parliament in January 1772, but was defeated.

Alexander Leigh's 29 shares were initially bought by two committee members, Jonathan Blundell and William Earle, both from Liverpool, and held in trust on behalf of the proprietors. Holt Leigh succeeded in buying most of the remaining shares, apart from two owned by his uncle Edward Holt, in the following year, and eventually sold them to the Leeds and Liverpool Canal in 1785. Having bought Leigh's shares, the Leeds and Liverpool lost no time in ensuring that they could adequately service the Wigan coal trade. By August 1772, work had started on completing Leigh's Cut and on constructing a junction between it and their canal. This was completed in February 1774, and boats could reach Wigan from Liverpool by travelling along the new canal, then along Leigh's Cut, and finally joining the river at Dean Lock for the final 3 miles (4.8 km) into Wigan. Various repairs to the navigation were made in time for a formal opening in October 1774.

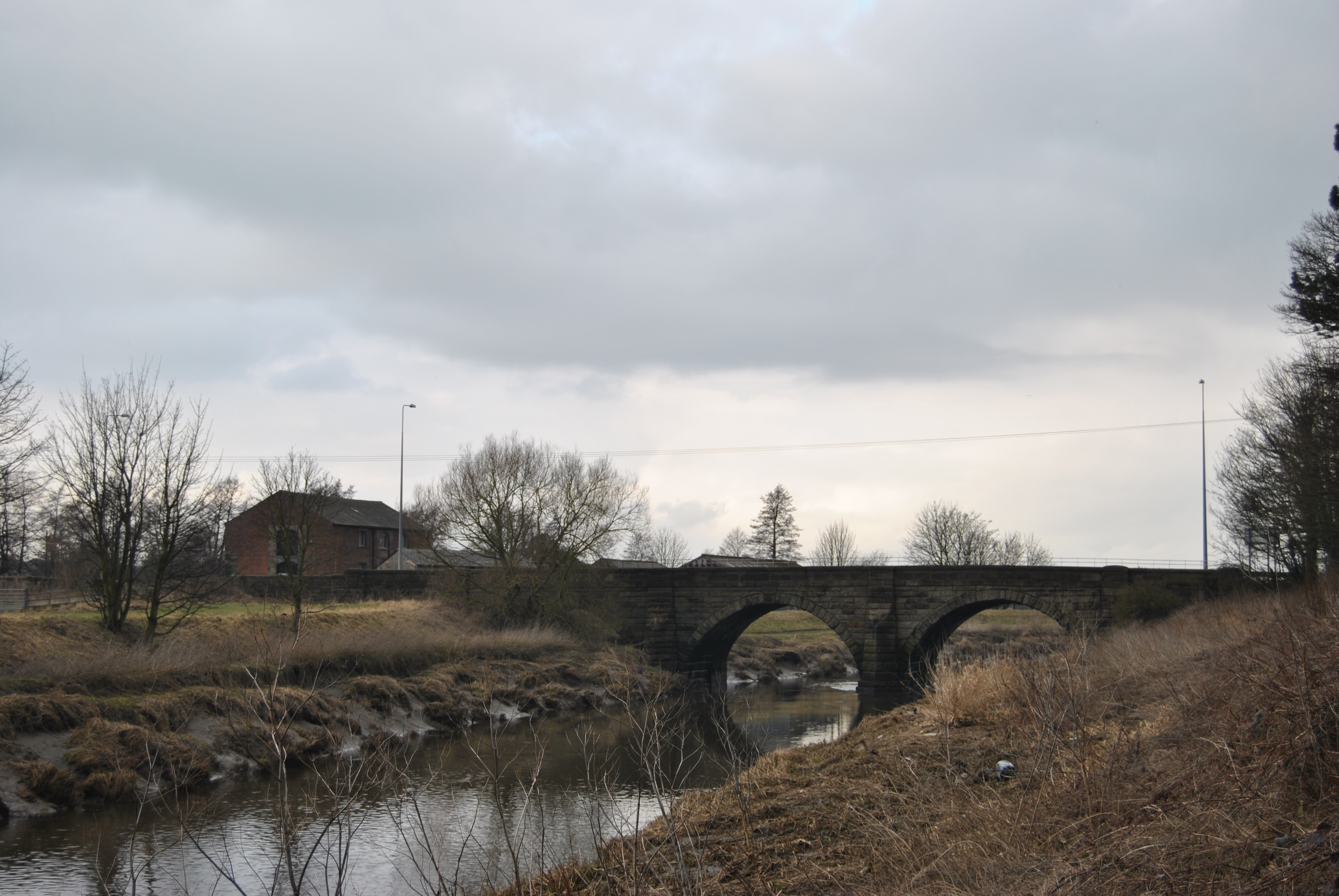
Bank Bridge at Tarleton viewed from the river bank at Bank Hall, looking north. The bridge is the nearest to the mouth of the river, as the West Lancashire Railway bridge at Hesketh Bank was demolished in 1965.

Alexander Leigh died shortly afterwards, and the Leeds and Liverpool rented the remaining shares in the navigation from Holt Leigh, who was administering his estate. There were calls to bypass the river sections of the old navigation entirely, and work started on a new cut, including two locks, from Gathurst to Wigan. Progress was slow, and it was not finished until 1780. The entire section from Newburgh to Wigan was known as the Upper Douglas Navigation. Meanwhile, work on a new canal to bypass the lower sections of the river began in 1777, and the Rufford Branch, which dropped through seven conventional locks and a tide lock to join the river near its mouth at Sollom, was completed in October 1781. This was known as the Lower Douglas Navigation.

All that remained to be done was to tidy up the legal details. The Leeds and Liverpool obtained another act of Parliament on 24 June 1783, which allowed them to purchase most of the remaining shares, but did not authorise the original purchase retrospectively. Once the canal was opened, all trade was transferred to it, and the river navigation was effectively abandoned. The lock gates on the river sections had been removed by 1782, and it was completely unused by 1801, although the wharf at Gathurst remained accessible by a side lock at Dean, and the side lock was still shown with gates on the 1928 Ordnance Survey map. In 1805, Sollom lock on the Rufford branch was abandoned, and a new tide lock was built further downstream at Tarleton. In order to build the extension, the river was diverted into a new channel further to the east between Rufford and Tarleton Bridge, and the old channel was re-used by the canal. From that time, only the lower portion of the river, from Tarleton to the confluence with the Ribble remained in use.

Because Edward Holt had retained his two shares, the Leeds and Liverpool Canal accounted for the Upper and Lower Douglas Navigation sections separately to the main canal, so that profits could be apportioned appropriately. This situation continued until 1893, when they were finally able to buy the remaining two shares from Holt's descendants. Thus, although trade on the river had only lasted for a little over forty years, the company lasted on paper for 173 years.

=== Trade ===
Both the original bill presented to Parliament in 1713 nnd the second attempt in 1720 were supported by noting the coal pits, and the delphs, a local word for a mine or quarry, of stone and slate, the transport of which would be much easier if the river was navigable. One of the provisions of the initial Act was that there was to be a maximum tonnage rate of two shillings and six pence (12.5p), regardless of the distance covered. Around 1738 or 1739, Leigh and Holt bought some land from Lord Derby at Freckleton on The Fylde, on the north bank of the Ribble opposite the mouth of the Douglas. The first traffic carried by the navigation was coal from Lord Derby's mine at Bispham to Freckleton. Sir Roger Bradshaigh worked in Parliament in 1739 to defeat a bill by Sir James Lowther to reduce the duty on coal carried around the coast. Lowther owned large collieries at Whitehaven, and if the bill had succeeded, he would have monopolised the coal trade to Ireland. Whitehaven coal was carried to Dublin, but the boats returned empty, whereas boats carrying coal from the Douglas to Lancaster and Kendal returned laded with limestone and iron, enabling the more expensive Douglas coal to compete with the cheaper Whitehaven coal. There were a number of wharfs along the navigation, but the two most important ones were at the terminal basin in Wigan, where coal from Bradshaigh's mine was loaded, and at Gathurst, serving coal mines at Orrell.

It appears that boats used on the navigation were between 45 and 55 feet (14 and 17 m) long, were less than 14.5 feet (4.4 m) wide, and had a draught of a little under 5 feet (1.5 m). Few records of what was carried exist, but a boat named Expedition carried coal, cannel, cinders (coke) turn and paving stones downriver, and returned with timber, hides, kelp, soap ashes, barley, beans, and most importantly limestone, which was the major return cargo. These records are for the years 1752 to 1755, while records dating from 1764 to 1768 for another boat called Success indicate that downriver traffic was mainly coal, with some cinders, paving stones and slates, while upriver traffic was exclusively limestone. Holt Leigh's diaries indicate that tolls for 1772 were £414, which would suggest that over 10,000 tons of goods were carried that year. Total costs for construction of the navigation were some £12,385, which had risen to £32,226 by 1768, by the time interest and maintenance charges were included. Thus the navigation was not profitable as a business, but most of the investors had coal to sell, and the river enabled them to do that. Leigh continued to invest in the navigation throughout his ownership, and this was probably as a result of his trading activities in coal.

Once the new cuts were completed as part of the Leeds and Liverpool Canal takeover, coal traffic increased steadily, although the river was still used for a while, as mineowners did not immediately build new wharfs on the new canal. The tonnage rates on the canal were reduced, and the changeover speeded up by raising tonnage rates on the river. The separate accounts for the Douglas Navigation kept by the canal company show that revenue rose from £162 in 1772 to £1,790 in 1778, and that this revenue was just under one quarter of the total revenue raised by the canal company.

== Today ==
With the decline in commercial trade on the canal system, even the final river section became little used, with most pleasure craft venturing only as far as Tarleton Lock, and it was not until 2002, with the opening of the Ribble Link that this section of the navigation began to see any appreciable traffic. Below Tarleton Lock, boats must navigate 4 miles (6.4 km) of the tidal River Douglas to reach the River Ribble. Asland Lamp is located in the Ribble, and boats heading upstream to the Ribble Link must keep it on the starboard side, to avoid an area of shallow water, which can be treacherous when the tides are running fast.

Despite having been abandoned for 200 years, traces of the navigation can still be seen between Parbold and Gathurst, which include the remains of several locks. The river has been altered to improve drainage, and this has resulted in the destruction of most signs of the navigation, particularly below Rufford, although the section between Rufford Lock and Sollom is preserved, having been reused when the river was diverted to the east as part of the construction of the Rufford Branch. Sollom Lock has no gates, but its walls are still intact.

== See also ==
- Canals of the United Kingdom
- History of the British canal system

== Bibliography ==
- Clarke, Mike (1990). The Leeds and Liverpool Canal. Carnegie Press. ISBN 978-0-948789-40-3.
- Cumberlidge, Jane (2009). Inland Waterways of Great Britain (8th Ed.). Imray Laurie Norie and Wilson. ISBN 978-1-84623-010-3.
- Hadfield, Charles; Biddle, Gordon (1970). The Canals of North West England, Vol 1 (pp.1-236). David and Charles. ISBN 978-0-7153-4956-4.
- Nicholson (2006). Nicholson Guides Vol 5: North West and the Pennines. Harper Collins. ISBN 978-0-00-721113-5.
- Priestley, Joseph (1831). "Historical Account of the Navigable Rivers, Canals, and Railways of Great Britain". Archived from the original on 7 March 2016.
- Skempton, Sir Alec; et al. (2002). A Biographical Dictionary of Civil Engineers in Great Britain and Ireland: Vol 1: 1500 to 1830. Thomas Telford. ISBN 978-0-7277-2939-2.
