= Lancaster Canal =

Canal in Northwest England

Coordinates: 54°04′N 2°48′W

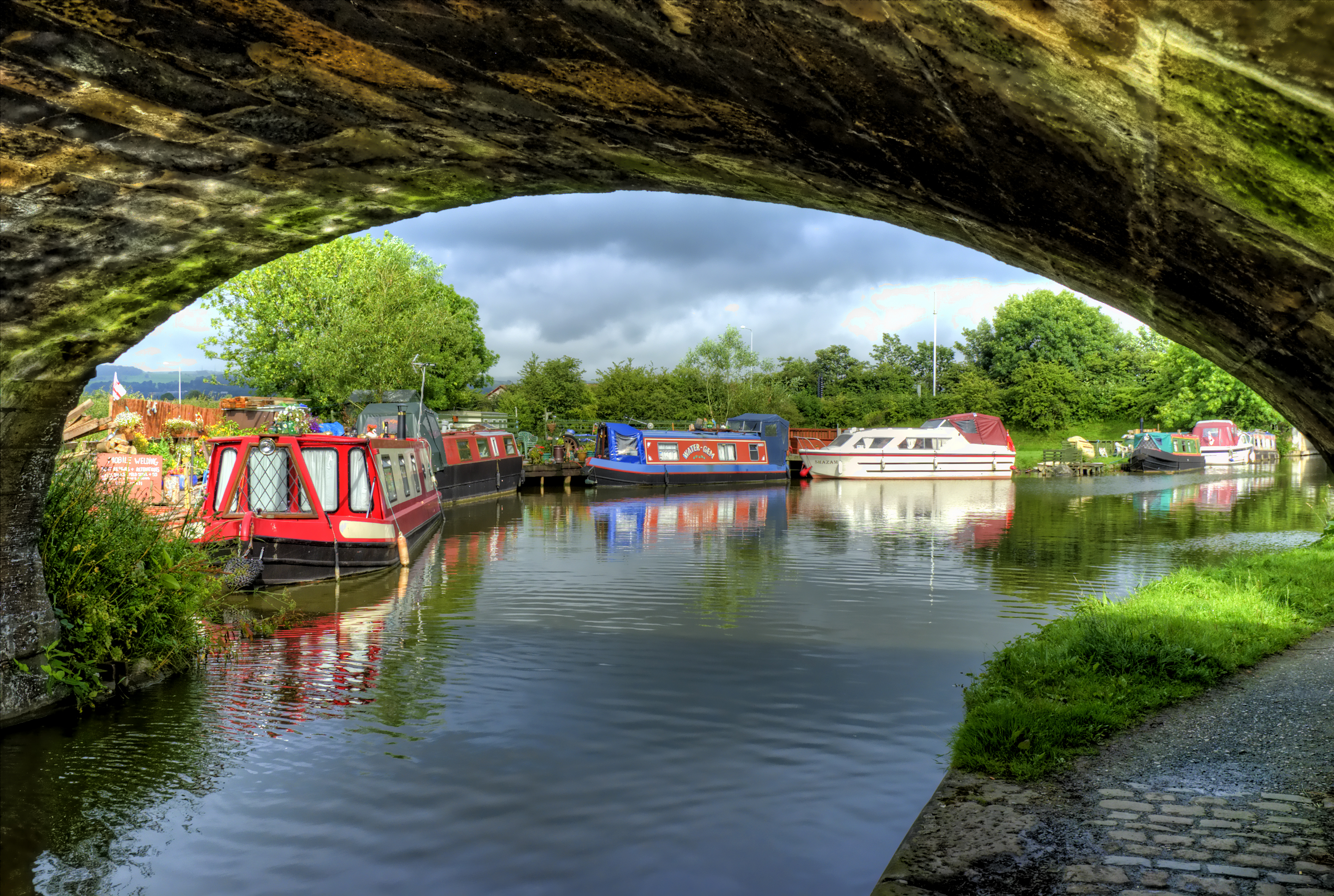
- Cathouse Bridge (No. 64) over the navigable section of the canal in Garstang
- Interactive map of Lancaster Canal

Specifications
- Maximum boat length: 70 ft 0 in (21.34 m)
- Maximum boat beam: 14 ft 0 in (4.27 m)
- Locks: 14
- Status: Navigable
- Navigation authority: Canal and River Trust

History
- Original owner: Lancaster Canal Navigation Co
- Principal engineer: John Rennie
- Other engineer: William Crossley
- Date of act: 1792
- Date of first use: 1797
- Date completed: 1826

Geography
- Start point: Preston
- End point: Kendal
- Branch: Glasson Dock
- Connects to: River Lune, Ribble Link

The Lancaster Canal is a canal in North West England, originally planned to run from Westhoughton in Lancashire to Kendal in south Cumbria (historically in Westmorland). The section around the crossing of the River Ribble was never completed, and much of the southern end leased to the Leeds and Liverpool Canal, of which it is now generally considered part.

Of the canal north of Preston, only the section from Preston to Tewitfield near Carnforth in Lancashire is currently open to navigation for 42 miles (67.6 km), with the canal north of Tewitfield having been severed in three places by the construction of the M6 motorway, and by the A590 road near Kendal. The southern part, from Johnson's Hillock to Aspull, remains navigable as part of the Leeds and Liverpool Canal. The planned continuation to Westhoughton was never built.

== History ==
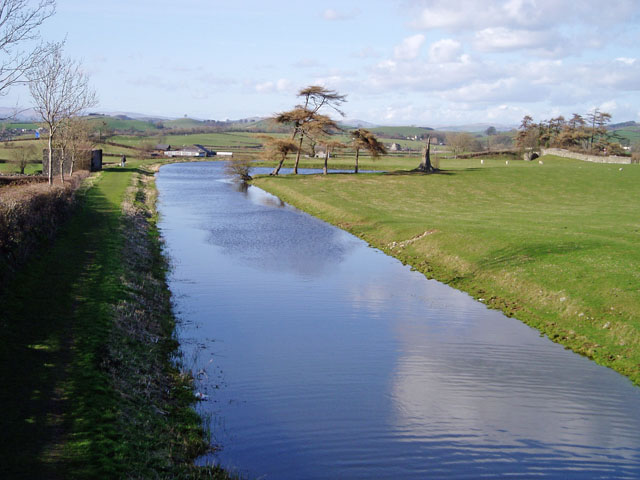
The canal at Farleton, Cumbria, in the unnavigable northern section. The building on the left was used as stables for the packet boat services.

Initial ideas for what would become the Lancaster Canal were formulated as a result of the high price of coal in the city of Lancaster and the surrounding area. James Brindley was asked to make a survey in 1771, but the work was carried out by Robert Whitworth, who presented his plans in 1772. The canal would run from the Leeds and Liverpool Canal at Eccleston for 54.5 miles (87.7 km) on the level to Tewitfield, passing through Preston and Lancaster. Locks would then raise the canal by 86 feet (26 m), and a further 18 miles (29 km) would bring the canal to Kendal. Major aqueducts would be required to cross the River Ribble and the River Lune. In 1787, a scheme to reclaim land along the coast and construct a canal passing through the reclaimed land was suggested by an ironmaster called John Wilkinson, but it failed to attract sufficient support for work to start.

In 1791, following a public meeting to promote a canal, John Longbotham, Robert Dickinson and Richard Beck resurveyed the proposed line, and looked at extending it southwards to join the Bridgewater Canal at Worsley. They could not suggest a better route than the one that Whitworth had proposed, but John Rennie was asked to see if he could, and in January 1792 suggested a 75.5-mile (121.5 km) route from Westhoughton to Kendal. This would have required 32 locks to descend to an aqueduct over the Ribble, and the Tewitfield flight would have been replaced by five locks at that location and four at Milton. The promoters sought an act of Parliament urgently, as proposals by the Leeds and Liverpool Canal to alter their route would have affected the profitability of the southern section.

Lancaster Canal Act 1793
- Act of Parliament
- Parliament of Great Britain
- Long title: An Act to alter and amend an Act passed in the last Session of Parliament, intituled, "An Act for making and maintaining a Navigable Canal from Kirkby Kendal, in the County of Westmorland, to West Houghton, in the County Palatine of Lancaster, and also a Navigable Branch from the said intended Canal at or near Borwick to or near Warton Cragg; and also another Navigable Branch, from, at, or near Gale Moss, by Chorley, to or near Duxbury, in the said County Palatine of Lancaster;" and also for making a Navigable Branch from the said Canal, at or near Galgate to Glasson Dock in the said County Palatine of Lancaster.
- Citation: 33 Geo. 3. c. 107
- Territorial extent: Great Britain

Dates
- Royal assent: 10 May 1793
- Commencement: 10 May 1793 (Note: The Acts of Parliament (Commencement) Act 1793.)
Other legislation
Amends	Westmoreland Canals Act 1792
Amended by	Lancaster Canal Navigation Act 1807; Lancaster Canal Navigation Act 1819; Lancaster Canal Transfer Act 1864

Status: Amended

Text of statute as originally enacted

Lancaster Canal Act 1800
- Act of Parliament
- Parliament of Great Britain
- Long title: An Act for better enabling the Company of Proprietors of the Lancaster Canal Navigation to complete the same.
- Citation: 39 & 40 Geo. 3. c. lvii
- Territorial extent: Great Britain

Dates
- Royal assent: 20 June 1800
- Commencement: 20 June 1800
Other legislation
Amends	Lancaster Canal Navigation Act 1819; Lancaster Canal Transfer Act 1864

Status: Amended

The Westmoreland Canals Act 1792 (32 Geo. 3. c. 101) received royal assent on 11 June 1792, and was entitled An Act for making and maintaining a navigable canal, from Kirkby Kendal in the county of Westmorland, to West Houghton in the county palatine of Lancaster, and also a navigable branch from the said intended canal at or near Barwick, to or near Warton Cragg, and also another navigable branch, from, at or near, Galemoss, by Chorley, to or near Duxbury in the said county palatine of Lancaster. The act created the Company of Proprietors of the Lancaster Canal Navigation, and gave them powers to raise £414,100 by the issuing of shares, and an additional £200,000, either by mortgage or by issuing more shares, if required. John Rennie was appointed as engineer in July 1792, with William Crossley the elder as his assistant, and Archibald Millar as resident engineer and superintendent. A second act of Parliament, the Lancaster Canal Act 1793 (33 Geo. 3. c. 107) was obtained in May 1793 to authorise the construction of the Glasson branch, so that the canal had a connection to the sea.

=== Construction ===
Work started almost immediately on the level section from Preston to Tewitfield. Contracts for 27 miles (43 km) of canal southwards from Tewitfield to Ray Lane near Catterall was awarded to John Murray of Colne and John Pinkerton. Although Pinkerton was a well-known canal contractor, Millar complained that the quality of his work was poor, and that he failed to follow instructions. Murray and Pinkerton were dismissed in 1795, to be replaced by several contractors each building smaller lengths of canal. In January 1794 work began on the Lune Aqueduct, which was built of stone, although Rennie thought brick should have been used, as it would have been considerably cheaper. By 1797 the aqueduct was completed, carrying the canal 62 feet (19 m) above the river, and boats were able to travel the 42.4 miles (68.2 km) from Preston to Tewitfield, known as the North End. Single span aqueducts carried the canal over the River Keer and the River Wyre. As the River Brock was on almost the same level as the canal, a weir was built above the canal and its bed was lowered beneath an aqueduct. Syphons were constructed to carry the River Calder and a stream near Ashton Hall under the canal. A formal opening ceremony was held on 27 November 1797, when six boats made the journey from Lancaster to the Lune aqueduct and back again, after which dinner was served at the King's Arms. £269,406 had been spent to get this far.

The section south of the River Ribble was a little more complex, because part of it was close to the intended route of the Leeds and Liverpool Canal. Work had been started on the South End, as it was officially known, in July 1793, when a contract for the length from Bark Hill near Wigan to Nightingales, near Chorley, had been let to Paul Vickers of Thorne. Negotiations with the Duke of Bridgewater had led to plans for an extension southwards from Westhoughton to the Bridgewater Canal at Worsley, but the bill presented to Parliament to authorise it was defeated, largely due to objections by the owner of Atherton Hall. The committee felt that a connection to the Leigh branch of the Bridgewater Canal, which was soon to be constructed, might be a better option. By February 1798, Vickers had completed construction of the canal from Bark Hill to Knowley Wharf near Chorley, and it was open for traffic. William Cartwright had been appointed as assistant resident engineer in January 1794, during the construction of the Lune aqueduct, but by July 1799 was resident engineer for the whole canal. He announced that 12 miles (19 km) of the South End was then open, as far north as Johnson's Hillock, and that the next section to Clayton Green was nearly completed, with the exception of the Whittle Hill tunnels. Meanwhile, the committee were struggling with cash flow problems, but the open sections brought in some much-needed revenue.

Attention then turned to how to join the North End to the South End. Several options were considered, including linking to the Douglas Navigation, and although the Leeds and Liverpool agreed to improve that waterway, the Lancashire committee could not afford their part of the work. They asked Cartwright for his opinion in 1799, and he suggested a 5-mile (8 km) tramway, to run from Clayton Green on the South End to a little short of the current terminus of the North End, which would be extended slightly. The committee then asked Rennie and William Jessop to consider Cartwright's tramway and another one that had been suggested, and to advise on a canal connection between the two sections. They suggested that an embankment should be used to support a canal at the same level as the section to Lancaster, with an aqueduct over the Ribble. Locks would be required to raise the level to meet the South End at Clayton Green. Their report included a design for an aqueduct with three arches, each of 117 feet (36 m), and a total length of 640 feet (200 m). Cartwright also submitted plans for an aqueduct, as did Thomas Gibson. Rennie and Jessop approved Cartwright's plan for a tramway as a temporary solution to the problem. They thought it would cost around £21,600, and work on it started shortly afterwards.

The existing South End canal was extended by 1 mile (1.6 km) from Clayton Green to Walton Summit, and a 259-yard (237 m) tunnel was constructed at Whittle Hill. This proved to be difficult to build, and it was 1 June 1803 before the first boat was able to pass through it. By that time, the North End had been extended to a new basin near Fishergate in Preston, but the tramway had only reached Bamber Bridge, and finally opened at the end of 1803. The tramway had two tracks and three inclined planes, each powered by a stationary engine and an endless chain. A wooden trestle bridge carried it over the Ribble. Cartwright died shortly after it was completed, on 19 January 1804. One of his other achievements was the cutting of a tunnel between the canal at Preston and the River Ribble, to provide a water supply for the canal. After his death, the project was completed by William Millar of Preston, and in July 1806, a Boulton and Watt steam engine began pumping water through the tunnel.

Lancaster Canal Navigation Act 1807
- Act of Parliament
- Parliament of the United Kingdom
- Long title: An Act to enable the Company of Proprietors of the Lancaster Canal Navigation to vary the Course of the said Canal, and to make Railways or Roads, and to amend and render more effectual Two Acts relating to the said Navigation.
- Citation: 47 Geo. 3 Sess. 2. c. cxiii
- Territorial extent: United Kingdom

Dates
- Royal assent: 13 August 1807
- Commencement: 13 August 1807
Other legislation
Amends	Westmoreland Canals Act 1792; Lancaster Canal Act 1793
Amended by	Lancaster Canal Navigation Act 1819; Lancaster Canal Transfer Act 1864

Status: Amended

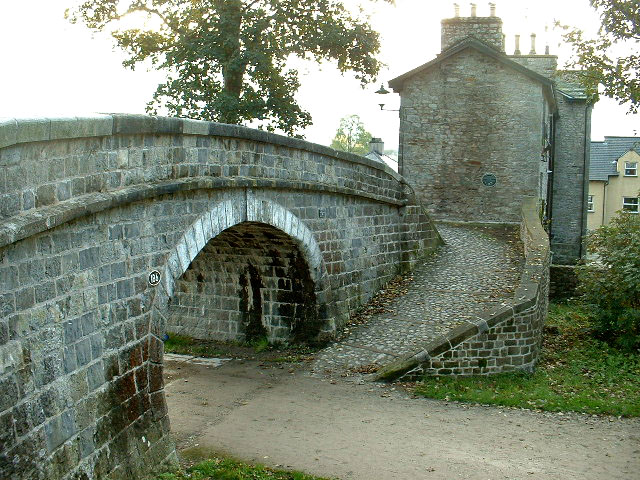
Change Bridge on the route of the canal through Kendal

When the committee had been set up in 1792, most of the members had been from Lancaster, with one from Preston and one from Kendal. This continued to be the case, and resulted in the extension northwards to Kendal being continually deferred. Millar surveyed two routes in 1805, and also considered the possibility of a tramway. The tramway was much cheaper, but the committee obtained a new act of Parliament, the Lancaster Canal Navigation Act 1807 (47 Geo. 3 Sess. 2. c. cxiii), to authorise variations to Rennie's route between Tewitfield and Hincaster, which also reverted to having all of the locks at Tewitfield. After much debate and several changes of plan, terms were finally agreed with the Leeds and Liverpool Canal, which would allow them to use much of the South End. The Lancaster Canal would construct two branches, a short 0.5-mile (0.8 km) length from Bark Hill to Wigan top lock, and a longer branch rising 64 feet (20 m) through seven locks from Johnson's Hillock. In order to provide a water supply to the Kendal level, they bought 86 acres (35 ha) of land at Killington for a reservoir, but the cost of the branches and the reservoir meant that there was no money left to construct the canal, and so the link to Kendal was deferred again.

Thomas Fletcher became the engineer in 1812, and his first task was to prepare estimates for the canal to Kendal. An agreement to start work was reached in 1813, and construction of the canal north of the locks, including Hincaster Tunnel and Killington Reservoir, was managed by William Crosley from May 1817. The tunnel was finished on 25 December 1817, but the finishing of the locks took a little longer. The embankment for Killington Reservoir was raised several times, so that it now covered an area of 153 acres (62 ha), and it was full by the time the locks were completed. The opening ceremony for the Northern Reaches, as this section would become known, was held on 18 June 1819, with a flotilla of boats followed by dinner and a ball at the Town Hall in Kendal.

Lancaster Canal Navigation Act 1819
- Act of Parliament
- Parliament of the United Kingdom
- Long title: An Act to alter and amend the several Acts passed for making and maintaining the Lancaster Canal Navigation.
- Citation: 59 Geo. 3. c. lxiv
- Territorial extent: United Kingdom

Dates
- Royal assent: 14 June 1819
- Commencement: 14 June 1819
Other legislation
Amends	Leeds and Liverpool Canal Act 1770; Westmoreland Canals Act 1792; Lancaster Canal Act 1793; Lancaster Canal Act 1800; Lancaster Canal Navigation Act 1807
Amended by	Lancaster Canal Transfer Act 1864; British Transport Commission Act 1956
Relates to	Leeds and Liverpool Canal Branch and Railway Act 1819; Bolton and Preston Railway Act 1837

Status: Amended

Text of statute as originally enacted

The next project would be the 2.5-mile (4 km) Glasson Dock branch, which had been authorised by the act of Parliament obtained in 1792. There was opposition from Preston, who felt that the canal crossing of the Ribble was much more important, but the makeup of the committee meant that the Glasson Branch was preferred. They obtained another act of Parliament, the Lancaster Canal Navigation Act 1819 (59 Geo. 3. c. lxiv) in 1819, to authorise the raising of more capital, and to retrospectively sanction the construction of Killington reservoir and the branch to the Leeds and Liverpool Canal at Johnson's Hillock. Crosley had taken over as superintendent of the entire canal from Fletcher in 1820, and work commenced in 1823. It was finished in December 1825, with six locks carrying the canal down 52 feet (16 m) to the basin and dock. The company was short of money, and the lack of warehouses and wharves initially led to trade developing slowly. With the project complete, Crosley left in June 1826 to become engineer on the Macclesfield Canal, and was replaced by Bryan Padgett Gregson.

A canal crossing of the River Ribble was never constructed. In 1813, when the northern extension to Kendal was about to be built, some of the Preston proprietors, led by a man called Shuttleworth, proposed a scheme to cross the Ribble on the level, which Fletcher decided was not practicable. They then proposed an aqueduct at a lower level, with locks on both sides of the river. Fletcher estimated the cost as £160,537, and while it could be done, that amount of money was not available, and providing a water supply for the locks would be difficult. Shuttleworth then demanded a special general meeting in 1817, at which he suggested that the cost could be obtained by applying to the Exchequer Bill Loan Commission, but his proposal was defeated.

=== Operation ===
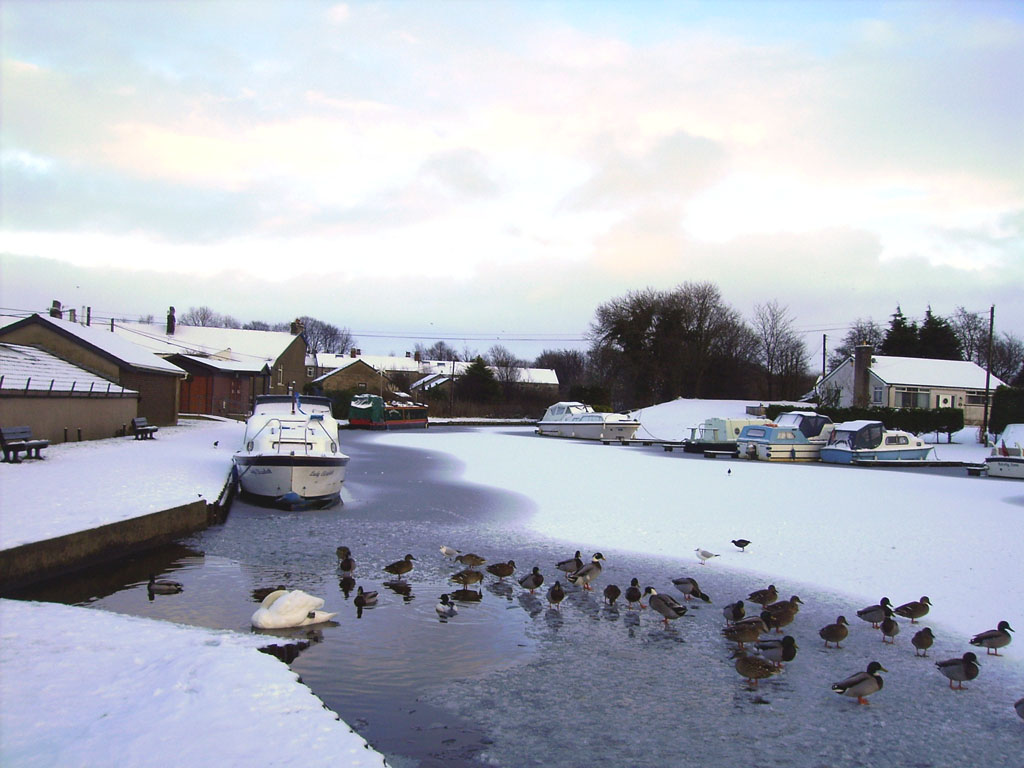
Basin at Carnforth, frozen over in the winter

Once the North End and the South End were connected by the tramway, profitability increased significantly. In 1803, gross income was £4,853; the following year, with the tramway now open, income jumped to £8,490. Revenue from tolls in 1803 was £4,332, with around 29 per cent derived from the South End and tramway. By 1807, this had risen to £12,467, of which 51 per cent came from the South End and tramway. Shareholders received a dividend of half a percent in 1803, and one percent from 1805 onwards. Toll income for 1820, with the link to Kendal newly opened, rose to £25,289, with just over half coming from the North End, and in 1825 was £27,069, with the North End contributing 52 per cent. Goods carried included grain, timber, potatoes and slate, while the canal was also used to export coal bound for Ulverston, North Wales and Ireland. The Glasson branch allowed small ships to use the canal without transhipment, and the number doing so rose from 64 in 1830, to 185 in 1840.

In the 1830s, the canal company realised it would have to adapt to the threat of railways. They forced the North Union Railway to build a bridge where it crossed the line of the canal to Westhoughton by extending the canal beyond Wigan locks for a short distance, although the idea of a canal to Westhoughton had long since been abandoned. The Bolton and Preston Railway wanted to use the line of the Lancaster Canal Tramway to reach Preston, and so they leased the line for £8,000 per year from 1837. However, they reached agreement with the North Union Railway in 1838 to use their line into Preston, but the canal company were not prepared to take back the tramway. In order to compete with a potential railway north of Preston, they ran packet boats providing an express passenger service between Preston and Lancaster, which took just three hours, and later extended the service to Kendal, with passengers walking up or down the flight of locks at Tewitfield and embarking on a second boat. The seven-hour journey time halved the best speeds of stage coaches; because of the comfort of the journey, passengers stayed loyal to the packet boats even after the advent of railway competition in the 1840s.

The pumping station at Preston was sold in 1836, as experience had shown that the water supply from Killington reservoir was adequate for the whole canal. Part of Whittle Hill tunnel on the South End section was converted to a cutting after roof collapses in 1827 and 1836. In the early 1840s, attempts were made to sell the canal to a railway company, but as neither the North Union Railway nor the Bolton and Preston Railway were interested, they leased the Lancaster and Preston Junction Railway from 1 September 1842. Seven years of complicated haggling ensued, with claims and counter-claims made by the canal and by various railway companies, until in 1849, the Lancaster and Preston Junction Railway became part of the Lancaster and Carlisle Railway. Acting as arbitrator, Robert Stephenson awarded the canal £55,552, and their claims to the railway ceased on 1 August 1849. During the seven years, the canal had made a profit of £67,391, which enabled them to pay off all their mortgages, award the proprietors a bonus of £1 17s 6d (£1 87.5p) per share and allocate £6,700 to a contingency fund.

Lancaster Canal Transfer Act 1864 (Note: Section 1.)
- Act of Parliament
- Parliament of the United Kingdom
- Long title: An Act for authorizing a Lease of a Portion of the Undertaking of the Company of Proprietors of the Lancaster Canal Navigation to the Company of Proprietors of the Canal Navigation from Leeds to Liverpool, and of the Remainder thereof to the London and North-western Railway Company; and for other Purposes.
- Citation: 27 & 28 Vict. c. cclxxxviii
- Territorial extent: United Kingdom

Dates
- Royal assent: 29 July 1864
- Commencement: 29 July 1864
Other legislation
Amends	Westmoreland Canals Act 1792; Lancaster Canal Act 1793; Lancaster Canal Act 1800; Lancaster Canal Navigation Act 1807; Lancaster Canal Navigation Act 1819

Status: Current legislation

Text of statute as originally enacted

An agreement was reached with the Lancaster and Carlisle Railway in 1850, whereby the railway carried passengers and general merchandise to Kendal, but the canal carried coal and heavy goods. The canal continued to carry goods between Glasson and Preston, and the relationship between the canal and railway carried on somewhat uneasily until 1858, when a dispute occurred, and the railway started to block the coal traffic from Kendal to the Lake District. The London and North Western Railway leased the Lancaster and Carlisle Railway from 1859, and the proprietors sought to lease the canal to the London and North Western Railway in 1860. After a bill to authorise the arrangement was defeated in the House of Lords in 1863, it was reintroduced the following year, and became an act of Parliament, the Lancaster Canal Transfer Act 1864 (27 & 28 Vict. c. cclxxxviii), on 29 July 1864. The canal company then received £12,665.87 per year for the lease of the northern end of the canal, which allowed them to continue paying dividends and to make investments. The South End was leased to the Leeds and Liverpool Canal for £7,075 per year, and the tramway was closed from Preston to Bamber Bridge. Traffic on the remainder of the tramway had ceased by 1879, and it was closed. Eventually, the railway company offered to buy the canal, and this was formalised by the London and North Western Railway Act 1885 (48 & 49 Vict. c. lxxxviii) obtained on 16 July 1885, although they actually took over the canal on 1 July.

Under railway ownership, the canal was well-maintained, particularly because it carried coal from Preston to Kendal Gas Works, which had been built in 1824 on land bought from the canal company. This traffic amounted to between 6,500 and 7,500 long tons (6,600 and 7,600 t) each year, and there was no railway access to the gas works. The canal had always suffered problems with leakage due to limestone fissures in the bed, and the London, Midland and Scottish Railway, who by then owned the canal, obtained the London Midland and Scottish Railway Act 1939 (2 & 3 Geo. 6. c. xxviii) which authorised them to close the first 0.5-mile (0.8 km) section at Kendal. By 1941–42, the section north of the gas works was unused and was closed because of leakage. The railway then attempted to close the whole canal in 1944, along with several others in their ownership, but opposition in the House of Lords resulted in the Lancaster Canal being removed from the scope of that act. Coal traffic to the gas works was transferred to road vehicles in 1944, and the canal carried its final commercial traffic in 1947.

=== Demise ===
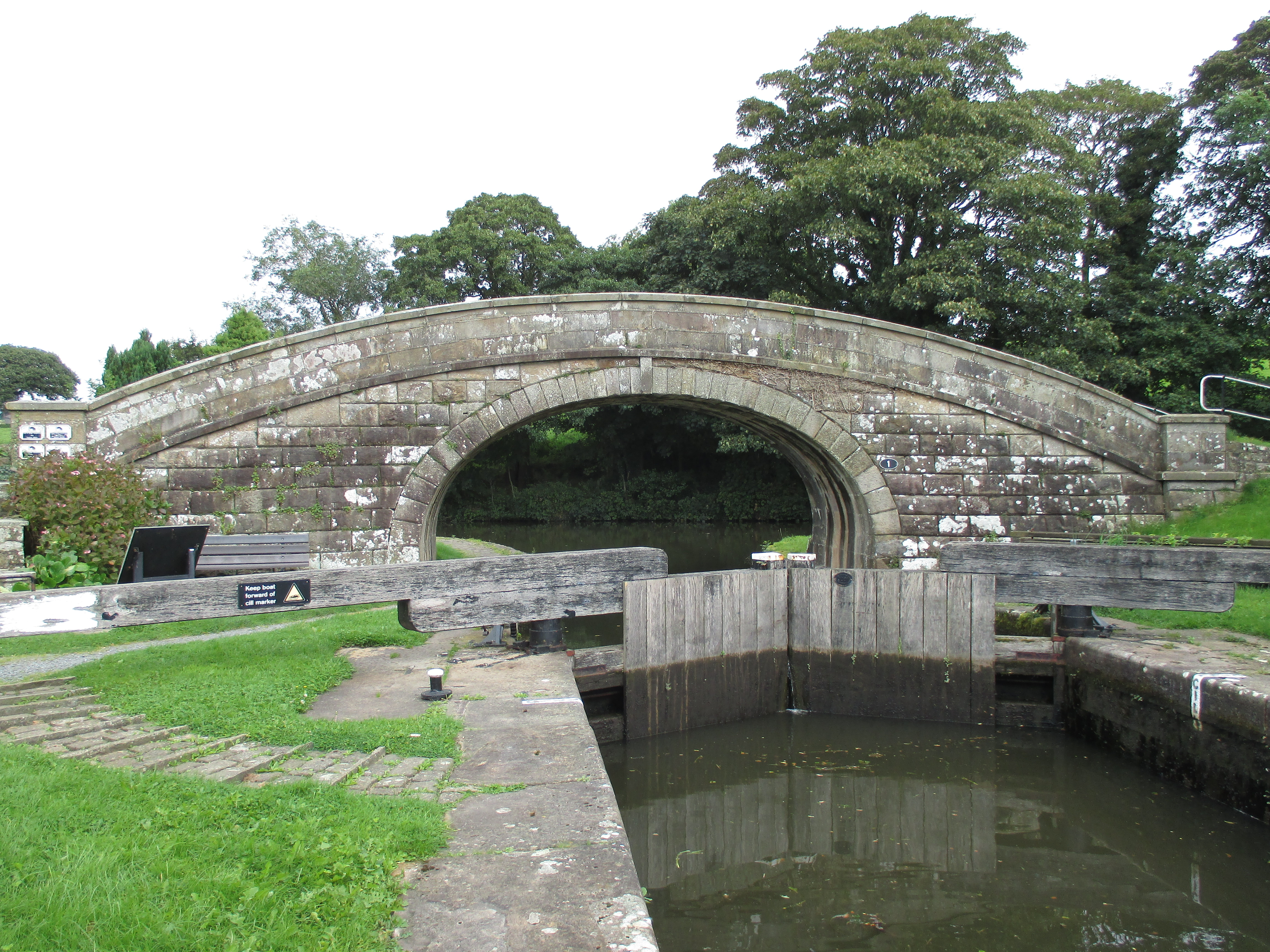
Bridge 1 of the Glasson branch, next to the junction with Lancaster Canal

Following the nationalisation of the railways and canals and the formation of the British Transport Commission as a result of the Transport Act 1947, the Docks and Inland Waterways Executive (DIWE) were responsible for the newly nationalised canals. In late 1952, the DIWE formed plans to sell off some 600 miles (970 km) of canals which were no longer commercially viable, including the Lancaster Canal, to county and local authorities. These plans were published by the British Transport Commission in April 1955, as part of a report entitled Canals and Inland Waterways. By then the Lancaster Canal was part of 771 miles (1,241 km) of waterways that formed group III, earmarked for disposal. Following its publication, the Inland Waterways Association organised a series of protest meetings, with the Lancaster Canal Boat Club being formed after the one held in Lancaster. The annual British Transport Commission bill was expected to contain details of what would happen to these waterways, but when it was published on 28 November 1955, the bill only contained proposals to abandon the derelict Nottingham and Walsall canals. The Inland Waterways Association detected a softening in official attitudes towards revival of the canal network.

Nevertheless, parts of the canal were abandoned, using discretionary powers contained in the Transport Act 1953, which allowed the DIWE to close unused or little-used canals. Around 5.75 miles (9.25 km) of canal from Stainton Crossing Bridge to Kendal were closed under the British Transport Commission Act 1961 (9 & 10 Eliz. 2. c. xxxvi), and drained, because of leakage through fissures in the underlying limestone, and the last 2 miles (3.2 km) in Kendal were filled in. Although the land was sold to adjoining landowners, the towpath was retained as a public footpath, and many of the bridges remain in place. At the Preston end, around 0.75 miles (1.21 km) of canal from Aqueduct Street southwards were gradually drained and partly filled in. Above Tewitfield locks, a 100-yard (91 m) section at Burton-in-Kendal was drained because of problems with leakage, and replaced by a pipe, so that the water supply to the lower canal was maintained, but navigation north of Tewitfield ceased. The gates of the Tewitfield locks were removed, and replaced by concrete cills, to act as weirs.

From January 1963, responsibility for the canal passed to the newly formed British Waterways Board. The Association for the Restoration of the Lancaster Canal was formed in December 1963, to campaign for retention of the canal. It later became the Lancaster Canal Trust. When the Ministry of Transport were developing plans for the M6 motorway north of Preston, they were not prepared to fund bridges where the route crossed the canal, and published plans to abandon the canal north of Tewitfield in mid 1965. There was a local campaign for bridges to be built, so that restoration would be possible in the future, but the canal was culverted at the three locations where the motorway crossed it, and at three more sites, where other roads were re-routed as part of the construction. The channel below Stainton could still be used by small boats, as it delivered water from Killington Reservoir to the lower canal, and also fed a pipeline which ran from the canal near Garstang to a chemical works near Fleetwood.

The Kendal to Preston section now terminates at Ashton basin, but previously continued to the centre of Preston where there are a number of streets and pubs whose names give clues: Wharfe Street, Kendal Street, the Lamb and Packet (the lamb being the crest of Preston), the Fighting Cocks (formerly the Boatmans). Most of the ground formerly occupied by the canal basin is now part of the University of Central Lancashire site. A Trust was formed in 2003 to extend the canal back to a new marina at Maudland, but as no progress was made, the university plan to landscape the area, in a way that will not preclude restoration of the canal in the future.

=== Southern end ===
The canal between Walton Summit and the Leeds and Liverpool link at Johnson's Hillock was last used for commercial traffic in 1932, although a party in canoes managed to navigate the branch as late as 1969 with only two portages This section was closed in the 1960s, as a result of the M61 motorway proposal which would have required three bridges over the canal. The Ministry of Transport and British Waterways Board decided that the cost of constructing the bridges was not justified, particularly as the canal was in poor condition, and promoted a bill in Parliament for closure of the canal. As a result, much is now buried under the M61 motorway, and in the Clayton-le-Woods area housing estates were built on the route in the 1990s. The remainder of the southern end, between Johnson's Hillock and Wigan Top Lock, is now considered to be part of the Leeds and Liverpool Canal and remains well used by leisure traffic.

== Restoration ==
At around the same time as the M6 was being planned, the first of many booklets produced to promote waterway restoration was published by the Association for the Restoration of the Lancaster Canal. It was written by T S H Wordsworth, and entitled The Lancaster Canal: Proposed Linear Park and Nature Reserve. Wordsworth was a planning officer for Lancashire County Council, and had been instrumental in setting up the forerunner of the Lancaster Canal Trust. Ashton Basin on the outskirts of Preston was restored and reopened to provide a destination at the southern end of the canal in 1972. In the early 1970s, the Inland Waterways Amenity Advisory Council had carried out a fact-finding survey of the northern reaches, and the Lancaster Canal Trust produced a report outlining possible ways forward. They then began promoting the idea of building slipways on the truncated northern reaches, to enable boats to access the canal where possible, and a series of slipways were completed, enabling a boat rally to be held over the Easter weekend in 1978. Although the Northern Reaches were officially no longer navigable, the pipeline that blocked the channel near Burton-in-Kendal was replaced by a concrete trough in the 1980s, which was made deep enough and wide enough to accommodate narrow boats, should navigation be restored.

An umbrella organisation called the Northern Reaches Restoration Group (NRRG) had been formed by 1992 to coordinate the restoration, consisting of nine partners. These were British Waterways (now Canal & River Trust), Cumbria County Council, Inland Waterways Association, Kendal Town Council, Lancashire County Council, Lancaster City Council, Lancaster Canal Trust, South Lakeland District Council and the Waterways Trust. They commissioned the civil engineers Scott Wilson Kirkpatrick to determine whether full restoration was feasible, and their report of 1992 concluded that it was.

In 1998, British Waterways and the Northern Reaches Restoration Group signed a joint Memorandum of Understanding, which formally outlined how restoration of the canal could proceed. In 2000, Scott Wilson Kirkpatrick updated their report, and a further study in 2002 estimated the cost for full restoration at between £54.6 million and £62.4 million. A feasibility report was launched on 20 March 2003, at a public meeting held in Kendal. This included proposals for an inclined plane, to avoid two crossings where the canal was cut by the M6 motorway. Although the cost was high at around £55 million, with an extra £2 to £7 million needed to construct diversions to join the existing canal to the plane, it was estimated that the project would generate some £24 million per year into the local economy, and would also create around 800 new jobs.

The Lancaster Canal was finally connected to the rest of the English canal network in 2002, with the opening of the Ribble Link. This provides access from the Rufford Arm of the Leeds and Liverpool Canal via the tidal River Ribble. On leaving the Ribble, it follows the course of the Savick Brook, and rises through eight locks to the junction with the canal.

A bid for funding to restore the whole of the northern reaches was made to the North West Development Agency (NWDA), but was declined in mid-2004. However, both South Lakeland District Council and Rural Regeneration Cumbria, an independent organisation funded by the NWDA, pledged £325,000 towards the cost of a design phase in October 2004, which British Waterways estimated would cost £750,000. The restoration would involve dealing with the three motorway crossings and four trunk road crossing where the canal has been culverted, and include work on 52 listed structures. Following discussions with the NWDA, the project was broken down into three phases, with the first covering the 1.5 miles (2.4 km) from Canal Head at Kendal to Natland Road. The second phase would cover from Natland Road to Crooklands, and the third phase would cover the rest of the northern reaches to Tewitfield. The Northern Reaches Restoration Group (NRRG) submitted a revised bid to the NWDA for £13.5 million, to fund the first phase of the restoration, and were hopeful that work could begin in 2007. South Lakeland District Council set aside £1.5 million to assist with this project in 2004. In parallel with these larger schemes, Cumbria County Council spent £125,000 on renovating Castle Bridge in Kendal, and Kendal Civic Society were are major funder for the £20,000 restoration of Natland Mill Beck Lane Bridge.

By 2006, the project development phase for the first section in Kendal was being led by British Waterways. Funding of £756,000 had been obtained from several sources, including NWDA, South Lakeland District Council and Rural Regeneration Cumbria. The two-year project commenced in January 2006. An Area Action Plan was published in 2008 for the Kendal Canal Head area, outlining plans for a comprehensive regeneration of both the canal and the surrounding area. The document incorporated many of the findings from the feasibility study produced by British Waterways, but restricted reinstatement at the final terminus. It suggested a new canal arm slightly further to the south, and that some of the hard edging proposed for the channel should be made softer, to accommodate some wetland and improve the visual impact of the canal. British Waterways had suggested using a concrete channel, to overcome problems of leakage, with edges using stonework excavated from the infill.

Despite the intentions, work to restore the canal at Kendal had still not been started by late 2016. However, work had started on extending the canal northwards from Stainton. In 2002, around 0.5 miles (0.8 km) of canal immediately adjacent to the end of the watered section at Stainton was offered for sale and was bought by two retired members of the Canal Trust, Angela and Howard Broomby. The Canal Trust worked on a 220-yard (200 m) length between bridges 172 and 173, which was dug out and lined with bentonite membrane to make it water tight. This was marketed as "the first furlong", and refilling of the restored bed occurred in 2014, to check that it did not leak. It did leak, and after much consultation, it was relined with large EPDM sheets, similar to pond liner, which was protected top and bottom by geotextile matting. The top layer was then covered with around 25,000 concrete blocks. Refilling of the section began in December 2021, and in the same month the Canal and River Trust, the successors to British Waterways, approved the work. As of early 2023, the final bund between the new section and the old has not been removed. Work is expected to start on another 490 yards (450 m) beyond bridge 173 in 2023, which will take the canal almost to Hincaster Tunnel, although details of how the canal will pass under the A590, just before the tunnel mouth, have not yet been finalised.

The Grade I Listed Lune Aqueduct was scheduled for a £2 million facelift in 2009–10. The organisations responsible for the aqueduct were awarded £50,000 by the Heritage Lottery fund to enable them to put together a credible bid for funding. Work began to restore the aqueduct in January 2011, and was completed in March 2012 with the project costing £2.4 million.

Stainton Aqueduct, which carries the canal over Stainton Beck near the northern end of the watered section, was extensively damaged in December 2015 as a result of flooding during Storm Desmond. This led to the temporary closure of the canal by means of a clay dam (the dam being intended to prevent any loss of water from the remaining open section, should the aqueduct fail). Funding was obtained for the restoration of the aqueduct with the main works commenced in August 2018 by construction firm Kier Group who have been employed by the Canal & River Trust. Restoration, which included resurfacing of 1 mile (1.6 km) of towpath, was completed in 2020, but due to the coronavirus pandemic, a formal re-opening was delayed until October 2021, when the Lancaster Canal Regeneration Partnership hosted a month of festivities. The work was funded by a grant of £1.5 million from the Heritage Lottery Fund, with other contributions by the Rural Payments Agency, South Lakeland District Council, Cumbria County Council and Kendal Town Council.

=== Restoring Preston Basin ===
In 2023, the Restoring Preston Basin campaign was launched to explore the possibility of repurposing the site of Preston Basin, the 300 foot long, 60 foot wide transhipment basin where the Lancaster Canal met the canal company's tramroad or plateway head on off Corporation Street in central Preston. Preston Basin was filled in from the late 1930s and represents the very southern end of the Lancaster Canal in Preston, which itself was cut back ¾ mile in length, de-watered and filled in from the 1960s to the canal's present terminus north of Aqueduct Street near Ashton Basin. The campaign outlines a number of possible repurposing options utilizing the footprint of the basin as an amenity, recreational and biodiverse space, much of which currently lies beneath the car park of the Corporation Street Retail Park.

The campaign was a response to the Preston Station Quarter Regeneration Framework which was launched by Preston City Council, Lancashire County Council and the University of Lancashire in 2022, and authored by Building Design Partnership. The framework called for the creation of 'green infrastructure' and the reuse of 'heritage assets' but did not make mention of the route of the former Lancaster Canal and tramroad and how these features could be better recalled and repurposed in any future development. In 2024, the campaign worked with urban designers and think tank Create Streets to create an outline masterplan and visuals for the area, which shows an option whereby the former basin is partly uncovered and repurposed as an open, green space with a section of wetland, acting as a Sustainable drainage system, surrounded by generic, new development represented by massing blocks. The designs can be viewed on the homepage of the Restoring Preston Basin website.

The restoration and reopening of Ancoats Green in Manchester in 2025 repurposes canal coping stones unearthed from the infilled Prussia Street arm of the Rochdale Canal for seating, clambering features for children and heritage markers. The park forms part of a planned biodiverse, pollinator corridor called the Prussia Greenway on the alignment of the former canal arm. Alongside more than 10 examples, Ancoats Green is listed as an inspiration for the Restoring Preston Basin campaign and summarised on the campaign website.

In 2026, the Restoring Preston Basin campaign successfully ensured discarded Lancaster Canal tramroad stone sleeper blocks were incorporated into the southern abutment of the replacement for the Old Tram Bridge over the River Ribble, which opened to the public on 22 May, 2026. The tramroad sleeper blocks can easily be identified by twin bore holes which once held gad irons countersunk in oak pegs to attach 3 foot lengths of cast iron flanged tramplates to them.

The Restoring Preston Basin campaign is supported by the Inland Waterways Association and Canal and River Trust.

== Route ==
Starting at Preston, the canal begins inconspicuously on an embankment, just to the south of Ashton Basin. It formerly continued for a little under a mile to a basin where it connected to the Lancaster Canal Tramroad. The towpath is on the left hand bank when heading to the north for almost all of the canal. With the exception of Preston and the City of Lancaster, most of the canal runs through open countryside, while all of the navigable main line follows the same contour, and is therefore free of locks. At Preston, the canal runs through urban surroundings for around 2 miles (3.2 km), passing the junction with the Ribble Link at 1.4 miles (2.3 km), where there was a large sculpture, Gauging the Ripple, one of four nearby which were created by Thompson Dagnall. However, the wooden construction suffered from rot, and it was removed in 2007. It has since been replaced by a statue of a canal barge with large hand tools on it, made from stainless steel, which is perched on top of a corten steel plinth.

The canal is crossed by the M55 motorway before reaching Swillbrook, to the south of Catford, and then crosses the Woodplumpton Brook at Woodplumpton Aqueduct, before turning to the north. At Bilsborrow it is briefly joined by the A6 road, the West Coast Main Line railway and the M6 motorway. To the north of the village is Brock Aqueduct, and the canal continues to the east of Catterall to reach Garstang, where it crosses the River Wyre on a stone aqueduct, which is 110 feet (34 m) long and 34 feet (10 m) high. The inlet from the canal to Garstang Marina is a visual reporting point (VRP) for general aviation aircraft in the local Blackpool airspace. Beyond Garstang, the canal passes through open countryside, with few villages, before reaching the junction with the Glasson Dock branch, 24 miles (39 km) from Preston. A further rural section brings it to the southern edge of Lancaster.

Within Lancaster, the canal is hemmed in by buildings. The towpath briefly crosses to the east bank between bridges 98 and 100, before Bulk Road Aqueduct carries it over the A683 road. The aqueduct is relatively modern, having been built in 1961. Shortly afterwards comes the Lune Aqueduct, crossing the non-tidal part of the River Lune, which is 30.8 miles (49.6 km) from Preston. At Hest Bank the canal comes close to the sea at Morecambe Bay, and follows the coastline through Bolton-le-Sands, before turning inland at Carnforth. Its passage through the town is mostly in a cutting, and on the eastern edge of Carnforth, is crossed by the A601(M) motorway. Immediately afterwards, it follows a new route alongside the M6 motorway, before making a sharp turn through a new bridge under the motorway, and rejoining its historic course. It crosses the River Keer on a small aqueduct at Capernwray, overshadowed by a much larger viaduct that carries the railway over the river and the canal. The Capernwray Arm, a short branch that once served a quarry, now offers secluded moorings to the east of the main line, and after passing along the western edge of Borwick, the navigable canal ends at Tewitfield Marina next to the M6 motorway, which is 42.1 miles (67.8 km) from Preston.

Beyond lie the eight abandoned Tewitfield locks, isolated from the canal by Twitfield Culvert under the A6070 road at the southern end and Cinderbarrow Culvert under the M6 motorway at the northern end. Nearly 8 miles (13 km) of canal above Cinderbarrow Culvert remain in water, and can be used by canoes and other small craft that can be portaged around obstructions. It remains in water because Killington Reservoir still acts as the main water supply for the navigable section below the locks. Burton-in-Kendal is to the east of the canal, with Holme to the west. The former bridge carrying North Road has been lowered to become a culvert, and at Spinney Culvert, the M6 motorway again crosses the canal, while the towpath has been diverted away from the canal, to rejoin it at Duke's Bridge. To the north of Farleton, Farleton Aqueduct carries the canal over Farleton Beck. Moss Side Culvert blocks the canal where the A65 road crosses it, and the M6 motorway crosses for the third time at Millness Culvert. At Crooklands, the canal crosses the Peasey Beck, which carries water from Killington Reservoir to supply the canal, and from here to Stainton the canal is used by a trip boat operated by the Lancaster Canal Trust. The watered section ends just beyond Stainton Aqueduct, some 50 miles (80 km) from Preston.

Although dry and partly infilled, its route can be followed for the final 5 miles (8 km) to Kendal. It passes through Hincaster Tunnel and over Sedgwick Aqueduct, which crosses the main street in Sedgwick. Although the course is infilled, there are a number of bridges still in good condition, including the Changeline Bridge, where the towpath changes to the eastern bank of the canal. Shortly afterwards, it arrives at Canal Head, where a number of stone buildings date from the time of the canal's construction. The basin is 55.8 miles (89.8 km) from Preston.

== Angling ==
Angling along the Lancaster Canal’s towpath is controlled by the Pike Anglers Club of Great Britain (PAC), a club centred around the angling and conservation of Pike. It remains the club’s only fishery. Anglers must purchase a Lancaster Canal permit directly from the PAC, but if wanting to fish for Pike specifically, must also be a member of the PAC, as well as having a Lancaster Canal permit.

The Canal also contains other coarse fish such as Bream, Carp, Eel, Gudgeon, Perch, Roach and Rudd.

== See also ==
- Ribble Link Trust
- Lancaster Canal Tramroad

== Bibliography ==
- Barritt, S. (2000). The Old Tramroad - Walton Summit to Preston Basin. Carnegie Publishing. ISBN 978-1-85936-058-3.
- Biddle, Gorden (2018). 200 Years of the Lancaster Canal. Pen and Sword. ISBN 978-1-52670-434-4.
- Cumberlidge, Jane (2009). Inland Waterways of Great Britain (8th Ed). Imray Laurie Norie and Wilson. ISBN 978-1-84623-010-3.
- Clifford, John (December 2004). "Further Funds for Northern Reaches?". Waterways World. ISSN 0309-1422.
- Conway, Lawrence (April 2008). "Kendal Canal Head Area Action Plan" (PDF). South Lakeland District Council. Archived (PDF) from the original on 15 November 2021.
- Denny, Andrew (May 2015). "Cumbria's Canal". Waterways World. ISSN 0309-1422.
- Hadfield, Charles; Biddle, Gordon (1970a). The Canals of North West England, Vol 1 (pp.1-236). David and Charles. ISBN 978-0-7153-4956-4.
- Hadfield, Charles; Biddle, Gordon (1970b). The Canals of North West England, Vol 2 (pp.241-496). David and Charles. ISBN 978-0-7153-4992-2.
- Jones, Tony (March 2023). "Northern Star". Waterways World. ISSN 0309-1422.
- Lancaster Guardian (4 July 2019). "Isolated 14 mile Northern Reaches of Lancaster Canal 'will re-open' say campaigners". Lancaster Guardian.
- Laws, John, ed. (2022). The Complete Guide to the Lancaster Canal (7th ed.). Lancaster Canal Trust. ISBN 978-0-9514146-6-8.
- Nicholson (2019). Nicholson Guides Vol 5: North West and the Pennines. Harper Collins. ISBN 978-0-00-830939-8.
- Philpotts, R. (1983). Building the Lancaster Canal (Rev. ed.). London: Blackwater Books. ISBN 978-0-946623-00-6.
- Potter, Hugh (March 2008). "Last Boat to Walton Summit" (PDF). Waterways World. Vol. 37, no. 3. pp. 96–98. ISSN 0309-1422. Archived from the original (PDF) on 25 July 2011.
- Priestley, Joseph (1831). Historical Account of the Navigable Rivers, Canals, and Railways of Great Britain. Archived from the original on 13 March 2016.
- Rigby, J. (2007). The Lancaster Canal in focus. Blackpool: Landy. ISBN 978-1-872895-72-7.
- Slater, D. (2000). The complete guide to the Lancaster Canal (2nd ed.). Lancaster Canal Trust. Lancaster: Lancaster Canal Trust. ISBN 978-0-9514146-1-3.
- Satchell, J. (2001). Kendal's canal : history, industry and people (Rev. ed.). Kendal Civic Society. ISBN 978-0-9509869-1-3.
- Squires, Roger (2008). Britain's Restored Canals. Landmark Publishing. ISBN 978-1-84306-331-5.
- Tomlinson, V.I. (1991). The Manchester Bolton and Bury Canal. Bolton: The Manchester Bolton & Bury Canal Society. p. 109. Archived from the original on 10 October 2008.
- Whitehead, Dianne (5 January 2006). "Restoration of the Lancaster Canal in Kendal" (PDF). Cumbria County Council. Archived (PDF) from the original on 5 July 2022.
- Willis, K.G.; Garrod, G.; Dobbs, I. (1990). The value of canals as a public good : the case of the Montgomery and Lancaster canals. Countryside change working paper series, 5. Newcastle upon Tyne: Countryside Change Unit, University of Newcastle upon Tyne.
- Yeadon, H.L. (2005). The Motorway Achievement: Building the Network: The North West of England. Chichester: Phillimore & Co. ISBN 978-1-86077-352-5.
