= Lancaster Canal Tramroad =

Former horse-drawn railway in Lancashire, England

Coordinates: 53.7505°N 2.6964°W

Route of tramroad shown on a 2014 map Footpath/cyclepath along route of tramroad Former route of tramroad Extant Lancaster Canal Former route of Lancaster Canal

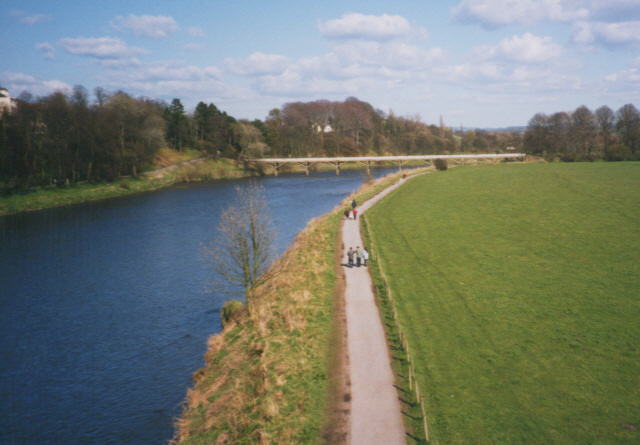
The River Ribble with the tramway bridge in the background

The Lancaster Canal Tramroad, also known as the Walton Summit Tramway or the Old Tram Road, was a British plateway opened in 1803. It ran between Preston Basin and Walton Summit, linking the two separately built sections of the Lancaster Canal north and south of the River Ribble.

== History ==
The Lancaster Canal Company obtained an act of Parliament, the Westmoreland Canals Act 1792 (32 Geo. 3. c. 101) in 1792 to construct a canal linking the towns of Kendal, Lancaster and Preston to the coalfields around Wigan. Coal was to be the chief traffic northwards and limestone southwards. (Note: In the original Canal documentation (see Barritt; 2000), the southbound and northbound tracks were referred to as the Limestone and Coal Roads respectively – reflecting their primary traffic and its direction) Most of the canal was completed quickly, including the impressive aqueduct across the River Lune near Lancaster, but the part across the wide valley of the River Ribble remained to be built when the construction capital became exhausted.

The original plan foresaw an impressive stone aqueduct across the river and up to 32 locks to complete the route. As a temporary measure, the canal company constructed a tramroad to link the two halves and allow revenue traffic to start flowing. Construction took three years.

== Tramroad ==
In 1794, the canal company engaged the services of William Cartwright, first to supervise the construction of the foundations for the Lune Aqueduct and later as Resident Engineer. John Rennie and William Jessop were the chief engineers to the company, but such was the demand for their services at this time of Canal Mania that they were much in demand elsewhere and Cartwright was solely responsible for the construction of the tramroad. His house in Preston is still extant and now forms the façade of the Fishergate Shopping Centre, currently occupied by Primark.

The five-mile-long tramroad comprised a double-track plateway, except for a short section of single track through a tunnel under Fishergate in Preston, just south of the canal basin. The iron rails were 'L' shaped in section and were spiked to large stone blocks. The wheels on the wagons were not flanged and it was the vertical section on the iron rails that kept the wheels on the track. The gauge was 4 foot 3 inches (1295 mm) between the verticals, which were on the inside of the track.

The wagons were pulled by horses, up to six at a time, and each wagon had a capacity of two tons. Originally there were three inclined planes where the wagons were hauled by stationary steam engines and a continuous chain.

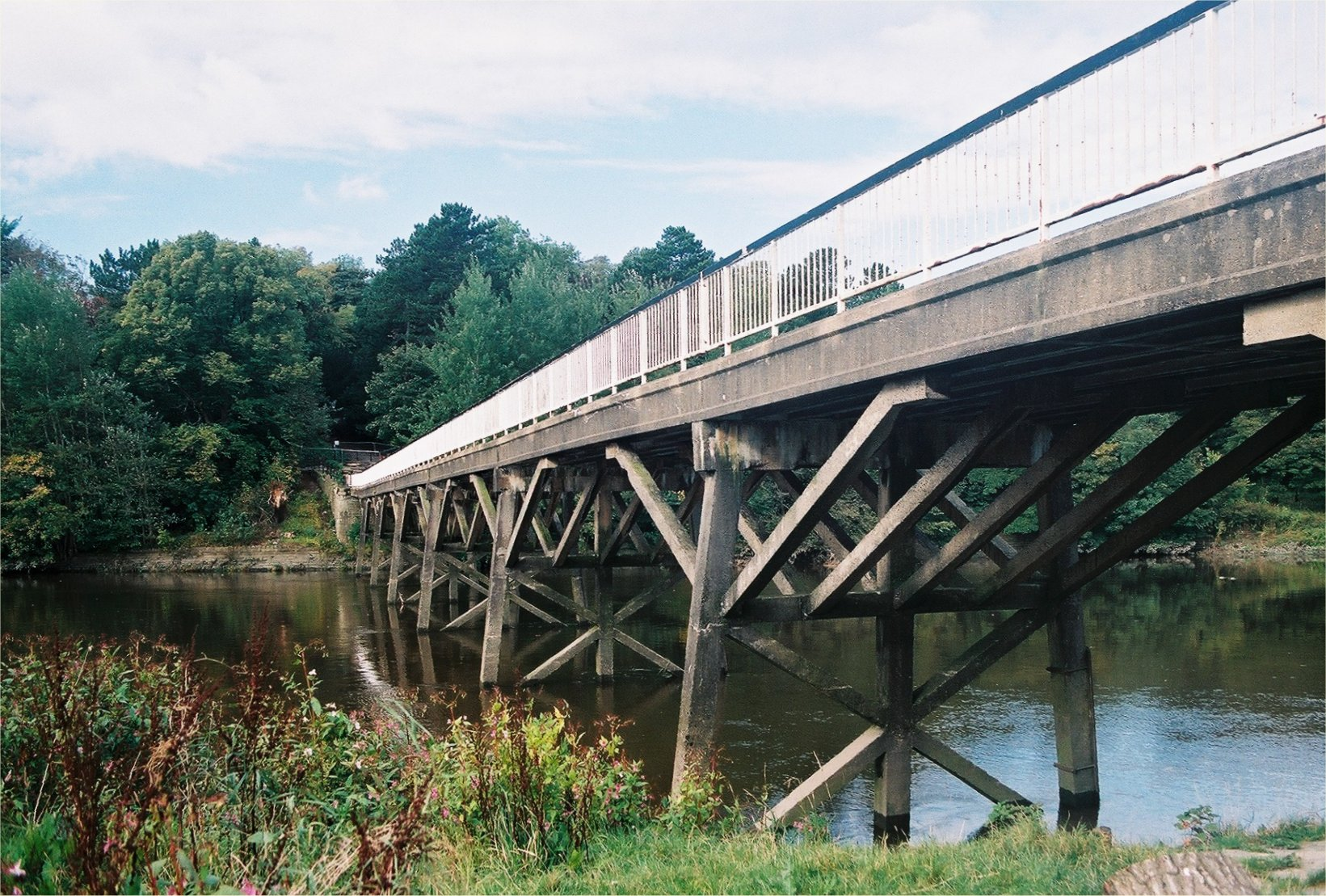
The concrete tramroad bridge across the Ribble

The tramroad crossed the River Ribble on a timber trestle bridge known as the Old Tram Bridge. This structure outlived the tramroad by nearly one hundred years albeit with heavy modifications (including the replacement of the wooden trestles with precast concrete ones in 1938 and the bridge deck with prestressed precast concrete in the mid sixties). The Old Tram Bridge was demolished in 2024 to allow the building of a replacement due to the poor condition of bridge in recent years.

There were many accidents during the life of the tramroad, many involving the inclined planes with wagons running away.

As was common on early 'railway' systems, the wagons could be privately owned by the hauliers themselves (known locally as halers) who paid the company a toll to use the tramroad. The last haler to work the tramroad, John Procter, walked the 10-mile return journey twice a day for 32 years. It has been estimated that he walked or rode nearly 200,000 miles (300,000 km) during his career on the tramroad, and needed his clogs resoling once per week.

== Decline and closure ==
In 1813, estimates were prepared to replace the tramroad by a canal but the cost of £160,000 was too much for the company at the time. In 1831 the coming of the Preston and Wigan Railway sounded the death knell for the tramroad and proposals were made to convert it into a railway or amalgamate with the new railway company. This never happened and the tramroad became embroiled in the railway politics of the day.

In 1837 the new Bolton and Preston Railway leased the tramroad as a potential alternative route into Preston that avoided the rival North Union Railway. However, an agreement was concluded between the two parties before this proved necessary. Nevertheless, the lease arrangements were incorporated into the Bolton and Preston Railway's act of Parliament and the ownership of the tramroad passed to the railway. In 1844 the Bolton and Preston merged with the rival North Union Railway and shortly afterwards a branch line to the canal basin in Preston was built. This created a railhead for Wigan coal in Preston and removed the raison d’être of the tramroad.

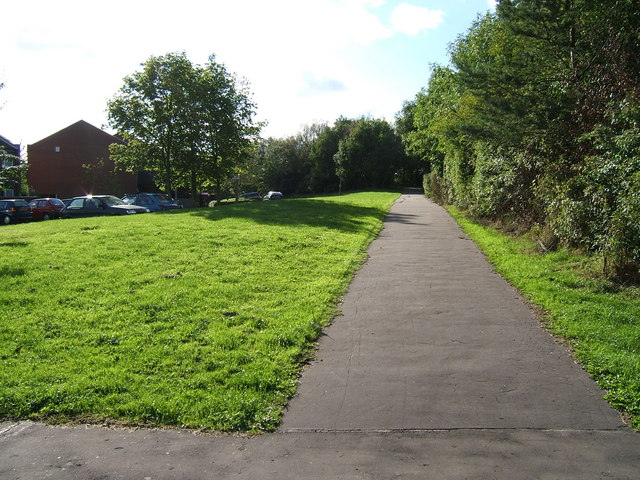
All that remains of the terminus of the South branch of the Lancaster canal

Although the North Union wanted to close the tramroad immediately the canal company objected and they were forced to maintain it in an increasingly decrepit state until the Lancaster Canal Transfer Act 1864 (27 & 28 Vict. c. cclxxxviii) provided for the canal north of Preston to be leased in perpetuity to the railway and that south of Walton Summit to be leased to the Leeds and Liverpool Canal. The act also allowed closure of the tramroad between Preston and Bamber Bridge.

In 1872, a land exchange between Preston Corporation and the railway saw the formation between Preston and Carr Wood pass into municipal ownership. This part, including the tramroad bridge over the River Ribble, was turned into a footpath, which remains to the present day.

A further act of Parliament in 1879 enabled the last part of the tramroad between Bamber Bridge and Walton Summit, to be closed. The north end of the canal was eventually sold to the London & North Western Railway and the Lancaster Canal Company was wound up at the beginning of 1886.

== Preserved remains ==
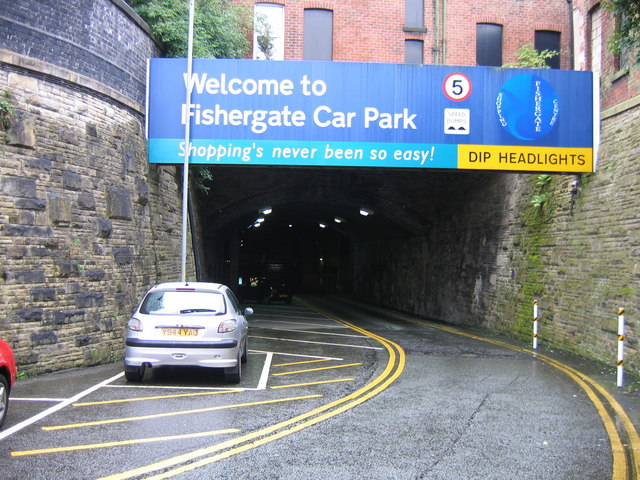
The tunnel under Fishergate is now used to access a car park

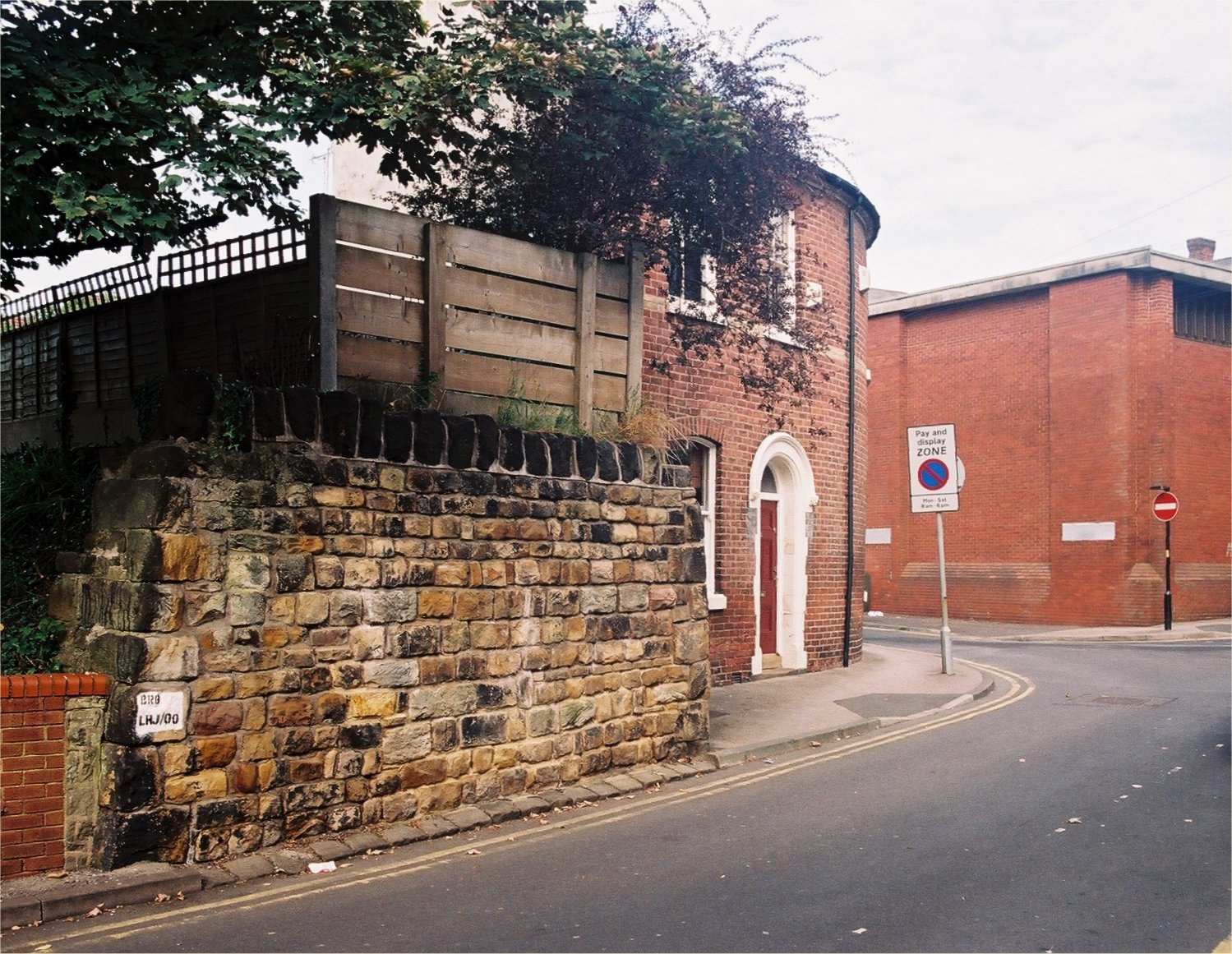
Remains of the bridge over Garden Street in Preston

A well-preserved section of track from the south side of the McKenzie Inn on Station Road in Bamber Bridge was taken up and relaid in Worden Park in Leyland. Plates and stone sleepers are in South Ribble Museum in Leyland and the Harris Museum in Preston. The Harris Museum also has a model of a wagon and a wheel and axle of a wagon recovered from the bed of the River Ribble (Clegg et al., 2001). They had lain there since an accident involving the failure of the endless chain on the Avenham Incline, which caused a train of wagons to run away and plunge into the river at the bottom.

A later (>1885?) enlargement of the tunnel under Fishergate (Moss, 1968) continues in use for vehicle access to the Fishergate Shopping Centre car park – it formerly accessed the Lancashire and Yorkshire Railway's Butler Street goods yard (Biddle, 1989). Part of a support for a bridge over Garden Street remains. A path on the northern edge of Avenham Park follows the route of the tramway, down the Avenham Incline and over the River Ribble on the unique concrete trestle and spar bridge that still retains structural features of the original wooden structure. The footpath continues along the flood plain embankment to the Penwortham Incline.

== Tram Bridge ==
=== 1966 Tram Bridge Reconstruction and Pedestrian Use ===
In 1966, following the significant deterioration of the 1936 timber deck, Preston Corporation commissioned a reconstruction of the bridge. This featured a pre-stressed, pre-cast concrete deck and steel parapets. It was designed specifically to facilitate public pedestrian and cycle access, rather than supporting heavy industrial traffic.

The 1966 bridge served as a vital public link between Avenham Park and Penwortham for 53 years. However, by the 2010s, the structure began to exhibit signs of critical fatigue. A formal inspection conducted in 2019 identified more than 200 defects including severe fractures in the pre-stressed beams and "spalling" (the degrading and crumbling of concrete supports). These findings and the fear of collapse led to an immediate closure of the bridge on safety grounds.

=== 2026 Replacement Tram Bridge ===
The replacement Tram Bridge was funded through Preston City Council's £20 million Levelling Up grant. The new 125-metre weathering steel bridge was designed by Studio John Bridge and DYSE Structural Engineers, and was lifted into place in December 2025. It opened to the public on 22 May 2026, restoring the active travel link between Avenham Park and South Ribble.

== Restoring Preston Basin ==
In 2023, the Restoring Preston Basin campaign was launched to explore the possibility of repurposing the site of Preston Basin, the 300 foot long, 60 foot wide transhipment basin where the Lancaster Canal met the canal company's tramroad or plateway head on off Corporation Street in central Preston. Preston Basin was filled in from the late 1930s and represents the very southern end of the Lancaster Canal in Preston, which itself was cut back ¾ mile in length, de-watered and filled in from the 1960s to the canal's present terminus north of Aqueduct Street near Ashton Basin. The campaign outlines a number of possible repurposing options utilizing the footprint of the basin as an amenity, recreational and biodiverse space, much of which currently lies beneath the car park of the Corporation Street Retail Park.

The campaign was a response to the Preston Station Quarter Regeneration Framework which was launched by Preston City Council, Lancashire County Council and the University of Lancashire in 2022, and authored by Building Design Partnership. The framework called for the creation of 'green infrastructure' and the reuse of 'heritage assets' but did not make mention of the route of the former Lancaster Canal and tramroad and how these features could be better recalled and repurposed in any future development. In 2024, the campaign worked with urban designers and think tank Create Streets to create an outline masterplan and visuals for the area, which shows an option whereby the former basin is partly uncovered and repurposed as an open, green space with a section of wetland, acting as a Sustainable drainage system, surrounded by generic, new development represented by massing blocks. The designs can be viewed on the homepage of the Restoring Preston Basin website.

The restoration and reopening of Ancoats Green in Manchester in 2025 repurposes canal coping stones unearthed from the infilled Prussia Street arm of the Rochdale Canal for seating, clambering features for children and heritage markers. The park forms part of a planned biodiverse, pollinator corridor called the Prussia Greenway on the alignment of the former canal arm. Alongside more than 10 examples, Ancoats Green is listed as an inspiration for the Restoring Preston Basin campaign and summarised on the campaign website.

In 2026, the Restoring Preston Basin campaign successfully ensured discarded Lancaster Canal tramroad stone sleeper blocks were incorporated into the southern abutment of the replacement Tram Bridge over the River Ribble, which opened to the public on 22 May, 2026. The tramroad sleeper blocks can easily be identified by twin bore holes which once held gad irons countersunk in oak pegs to attach 3 foot lengths of cast iron flanged tramplates to them.

The Restoring Preston Basin campaign is supported by the Inland Waterways Association and Canal and River Trust.

== See also ==
- Canals of the United Kingdom
- History of the British canal system
