= Old Tram Bridge =

English Bridge

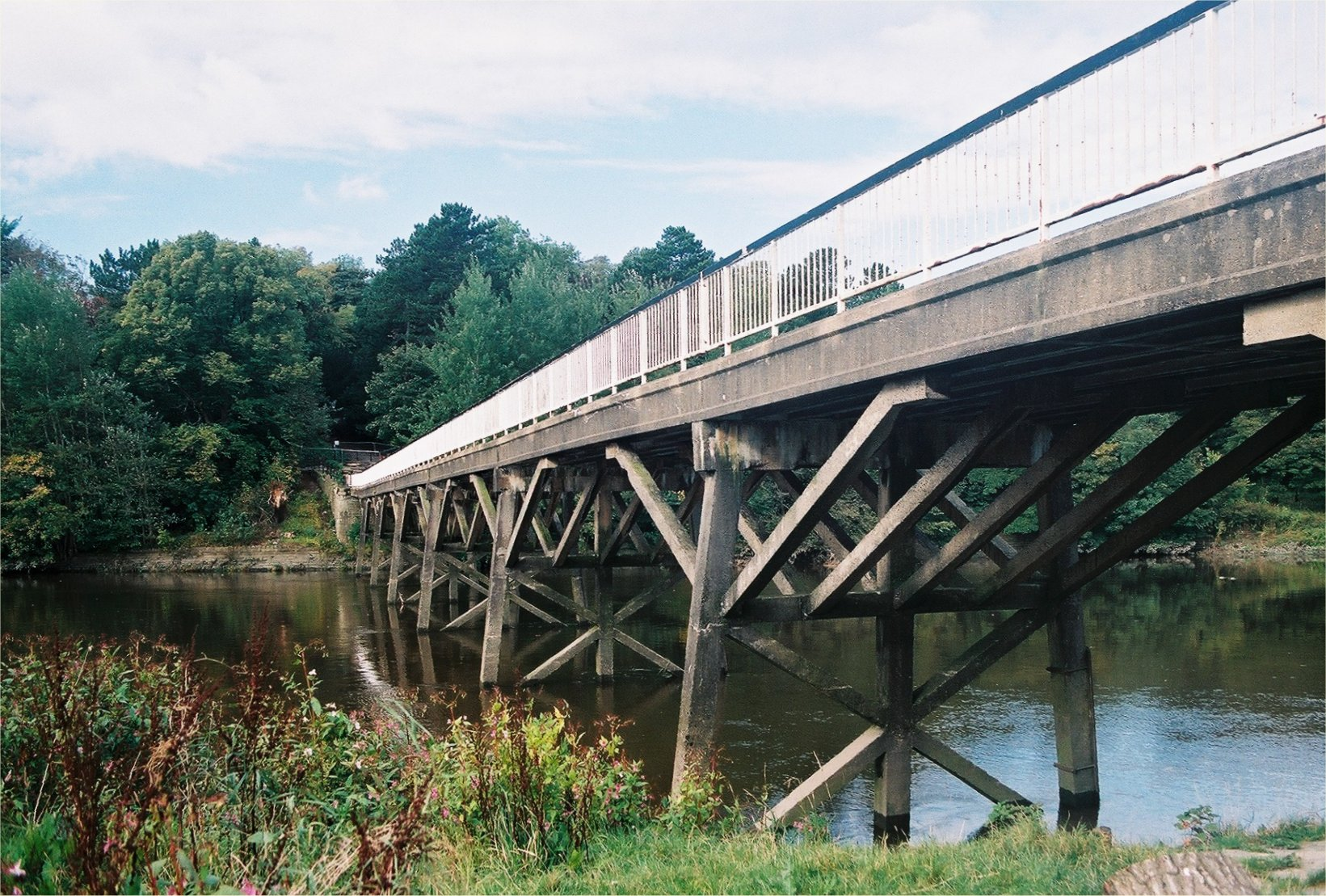
- Old Tram Bridge
- Coordinates: 53°45′07″N 2°41′48″W
- OS grid reference: SD541286
- Crossed: River Ribble
- Locale: Preston, Lancashire
- Ended: Avenham Park
- Official name: Old Tram Bridge
- Owner: Lancashire County Council
- Maintained by: Lancashire County Council
- Preceded by: Walton Bridge
- Followed by: Avenham Park Bridge

Characteristics
- Material: Concrete, Originally Timber
- Traversable?: Yes

History
- Architect: William Cartwright
- Engineering design by: William Cartwright
- Constructed by: Lancaster Canal Company
- Construction start: 1802
- Construction end: 1803
- Opened: 1804
- Rebuilt: 1890s, 1935 and 2025
- Closed: 1858, February 2019
- Demolished: 2024
- Replaced by: Preston Tram Bridge

Location
- Interactive map of Old Tram Bridge

The Old Tram Bridge is a now demolished crossing over the River Ribble. Built in 1802 by the Lancaster Canal Company, it was opened in 1804 to carry goods by horse drawn carriages. Following several rebuildings, it was completely demolished in 2024 and replaced by the Preston Tram Bridge which opened in May 2026.

== History ==
There has been a bridge crossing the river Ribble since Roman times, the road from Luguvalium to Mamucium (now Carlisle to Manchester) crossed the River Ribble at Walton-le-Dale, 3/4 mile (1 km) south-east of the centre of Preston, and a Roman camp or station may also have been here.

A 1715 map of the previous bridge crossing the river Ribble.

The Lancaster Canal Company obtained an act of Parliament, the Westmoreland Canals Act 1792 (32 Geo. 3. c. 101) in 1792 to construct a canal linking the towns of Kendal, Lancaster and Preston to the coalfields around Wigan. The original plan was to build an aqueduct but as a temporary measure, the canal company constructed a tramroad to allow revenue traffic to start flowing. Construction took three years. In 1794, the canal company engaged the services of engineer William Cartwright, first to supervise the construction of the foundations for an Aqueduct and later as Resident Engineer. The five-mile-long tramroad comprised a double-track plateway and was designed to transport wagons carrying coal from the Wigan Coalfields. Wagons were pulled by horses, up to six at a time, and each wagon had a capacity of two tons. Originally there were three inclined planes where the wagons were hauled by stationary steam engines and a continuous chain.

The Old Tram Bridge itself began construction in 1802 out of timber, finishing the following year and opened to the public in 1804. The bridge operated for around 40 years until falling into disrepair until ultimately being closed in 1858; Preston Corporation purchased the bridge from the Lancaster Canal Company in 1872. During the 1890s a chicken shack had floated down the river in a flood and destroyed some of the bridge supports, and so the bridge was reconstructed entirely during the 1890s at which point stone pilasters were installed.

In December 1935, high flood waters caused high levels of damage to the bridge resulting in the timber supports to be replaced in concrete and the replacement of the timber walkway. During World War Two, the timber walkway was removed to hinder a potential enemy advancement in the event of an Invasion. Restoration followed in the 1950s however during the 1960s, the bridge began to fail. A 1960 inspection learned that the concrete supports were beginning to fail and the timber was rotting; as a result, the bridge was closed in November 1964 to await repair. A loan was granted for the necessary work by the Ministry of Housing and Local Government in April 1965, along £17,725 being given by Matthews and Mumby's and work began to replace the concrete and timber by October 1965.

The 1965 bridge served as a vital public link between Avenham Park and Penwortham for over 55 years. However, by the 2010s, the structure began to exhibit signs of critical fatigue. A formal inspection conducted in 2019 identified more than 200 defects including severe fractures in the pre-stressed beams and "spalling" (the degrading and crumbling of concrete supports). These findings and the fear of collapse led to an immediate closure of the bridge on safety grounds.

The replacement Tram Bridge was funded through Preston City Council's £20 million Levelling Up grant. The new 125-metre weathering steel bridge was designed by Studio John Bridge and DYSE Structural Engineers, and was lifted into place in December 2025. It opened to the public on 22 May 2026, restoring the active travel link between Avenham Park and South Ribble.

Preston Tram Bridge, the replacement of the Old Tram Bridge as seen from Avenham Park
