= Ribble Link =

Canal in Lancashire

Coordinates: 53°45′55.19″N 2°47′19.49″W

The Millennium Ribble Link
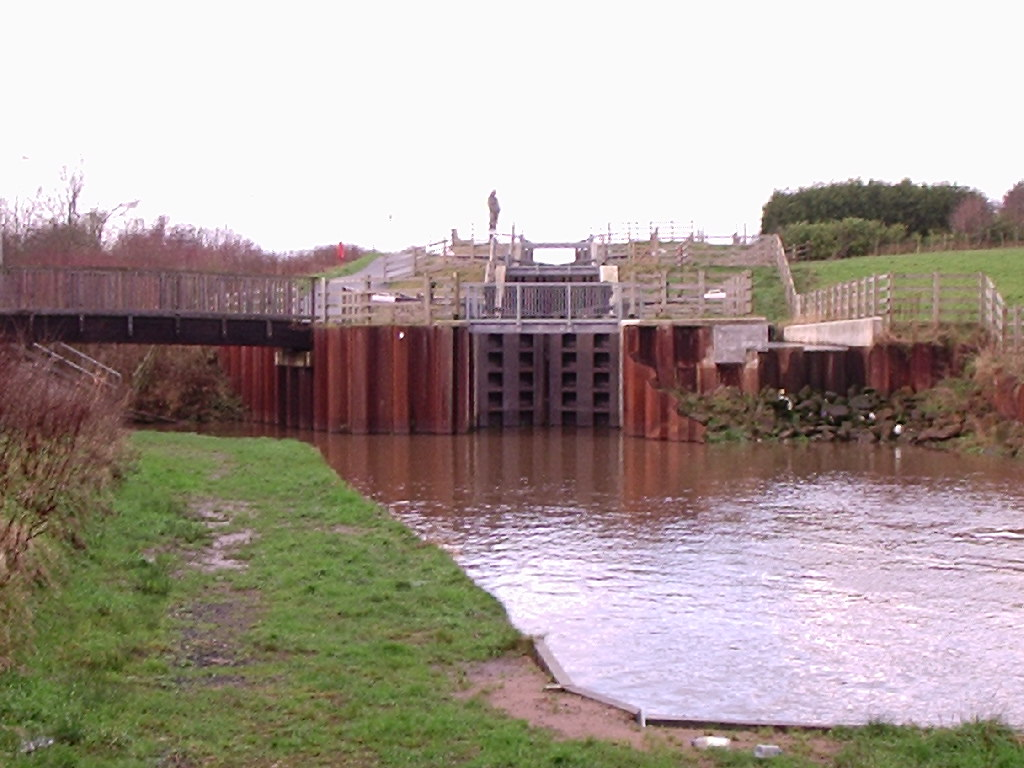
- The 3-rise staircase locks
- Interactive map of The Millennium Ribble Link

Specifications
- Maximum boat length: 62 ft 0 in (18.90 m)
- Maximum boat beam: 10 ft 6 in (3.20 m)
- Locks: 8 (1 tidal gate)
- Status: Navigable at certain times April–October
- Navigation authority: Canal & River Trust

History
- Original owner: The Ribble Link Construction and Operation Limited/The Waterways Trust
- Principal engineer: Gleeson
- Other engineer: Arup Water
- Date completed: 2002

Geography
- Start point: Lancaster Canal, Ingol, Preston
- End point: River Ribble

The Millennium Ribble Link is a linear water park and new navigation which links the once-isolated Lancaster Canal in Lancashire, England to the River Ribble. The Lancaster Canal was never connected to the rest of the English waterways network, because the planned aqueduct over the River Ribble was never built. Instead, a tramway connected the southern and northern parts of the canal. An idea for a connecting link following the course of the Savick Brook was proposed in 1979, and the Ribble Link Trust campaigned for twenty years to see it built. The turn of the Millennium, and the funds available from the Millennium Commission for projects to mark the event was the catalyst for the project to be implemented, and although completion was delayed, the navigation opened in July 2002.

The link is a navigation, as flows on the Savick Brook can be considerable, and there are large weirs and bywashes at each of the locks, to channel water around them. The lower end of the link is tidal, with boats passing over a rotating gate and through a sea lock to gain access. It is open from April to October, but only on certain days, based on the height of the tide, and boats can only travel in one direction on any one day. The cost of construction was nearly twice the original estimate, with just under half of it funded by the Millennium Commission. The project included footpaths, cycle tracks and a sculpture trail, to attract visitors other than boaters to visit it, and to generate economic returns for the local community. Since its construction, maintenance costs have been high, due to voids developing behind some of the lock walls, and the deposition of silt deposited by the incoming tides.

Although the link is strictly the canalisation of the Savick Brook, the Ribble Link is also used to refer to the crossing from Tarleton on the Rufford Branch of the Leeds and Liverpool Canal, 4 miles (6.4 km) of the River Douglas, the 3.5-mile (5.6 km) journey up the River Ribble and passage along the link to the Lancaster Canal.

Completing the crossing requires a little more planning than cruising on inland waterways, as the Douglas, the Ribble, and the first part of the link are tidal, but most boats make the crossing successfully. However, the Royal National Lifeboat Institution have responded to a number of callouts, where the Lytham St Annes lifeboat has had to assist vessels which have got into difficulties.

== History ==
When originally planned, the Lancaster Canal would have crossed the River Lune and the River Ribble on aqueducts, and it was intended that there should be a link to the Leeds and Liverpool Canal to the south of the Ribble. The Lune aqueduct was completed in 1797, but the Ribble one was not built, as the construction was well over budget by the time the canal reached Preston. The canal link was eventually replaced by a tramway link, crossing the Ribble on a wooden trestle bridge. The bridge outlasted the tramway, and it was not until the 1960s that it was demolished and replaced by a new pedestrian bridge, made of concrete beams but designed to look like the old timber structure. That structure is also under threat due to degradation of the concrete and corrosion of the steel reinforcement. The Lancaster Canal remained isolated from the rest of the English Canal network.

The idea of building a connecting link between the Lancaster Canal and the rest of the English waterways system was first proposed in 1979 by John Whittaker of the Lancaster Canal Boat Club, and a feasibility study was carried out in 1981, to see if using the Savick Brook would be possible. In 1982 the Lancaster Boat Club organised a cruise from Rufford Branch of the Leeds and Liverpool Canal up the Ribble to Preston Docks to generate publicity for the scheme. The cruise demonstrated that canal boats could navigate on this section of tidal water without difficulty, and the Ribble Link Trust was set up in 1984 to push the idea frowards. Plans were nearly thwarted in 1992, when there were proposals for a bypass around Preston, which would have crossed the Savick Brook at too low a level to leave headroom for boats, and the trust worked hard to get the plans altered.

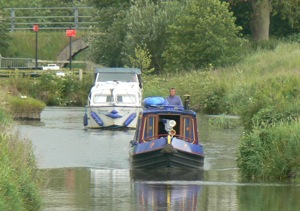
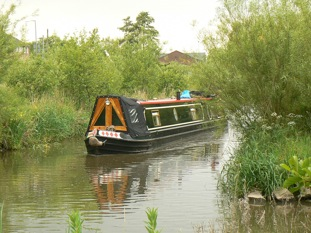
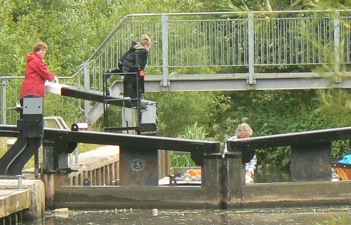
Pleasure craft use the Ribble Link navigation to pass between the Lancaster Canal and the Leeds and Liverpool canal.

Prior to construction of the Ribble Link starting, British Waterways carried out an archeological evaluation to establish whether any important archeological sites would be disturbed by the new waterway. This identified Mill Field close to lock 8 as the probable location of a water mill, and found evidence of a ridge and furrow field system. Although the visible remains of this were unlikely to be disturbed by the construction work, parts of it continued below the surface where the channel would be excavated, and it was hoped that its boundary ditches might be located when the work took place. The Environment Agency also carried out a fish survey, using electrofishing at eight sites along the brook, to ascertain the health of the brook as habitat for course fish. The fish were categorised as predator species, rheophilic species that prefer flowing water, and limnophilic species that prefer still water. The survey recorded eleven species of fish, with rheophilic species prominent at most of the test sites, and limnophilic species much less so. Flounder were also found in great numbers throughout the river, probably because the sand and silt on the bed of the river provide good habitat for spawning and for the survival of juvenile fish. The report concluded that fish populations were surprisingly high for a river that drained an urban area, and that chub and flounder were doing particularly well.

Flows on the Savick Brook vary considerably, from as little as 110 cubic feet per minute (50 L/s) up to 74,000 cubic feet per minute (35 m^{3}/s). In order to accommodate these flows, weirs which are up to 100 feet (30 m) wide were required at the locks, and the bypass channels generally use the original course of the brook. In order to allow fish to continue to move along the watercourse, fish passes would be built into the weirs. The Environment Agency raised concerns about water quality, but these were withdrawn in March 1999 after North West Water announced that they would soon be building a new interceptor sewer to run close to the Savick Brook, and the Trust agreed to make the channel slightly narrower, to improve flow speeds. When originally conceived, the navigation would have had eight locks, numbered 1 to 8 from the Ribble upwards. Lock 2A was added, to ensure that the level of the pound above lock 2 did not compromise land drainage in the locality. The locks were subsequently renumbered 1 to 9 from the Lancaster Canal downwards, in order to follow the convention used on the Glasson Dock branch. (Care should be taken when reading source documents on the construction, which use the old order).

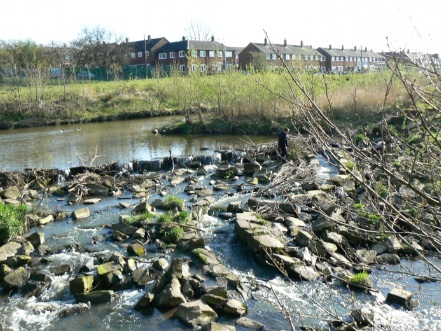
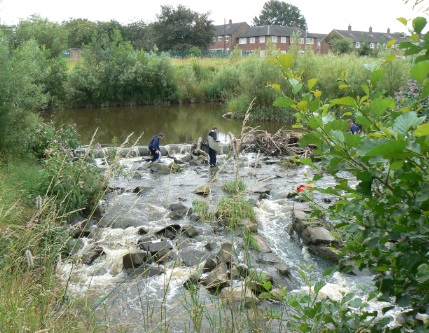
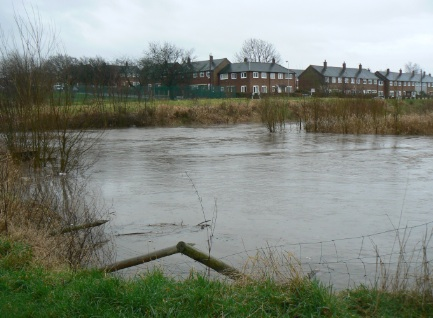
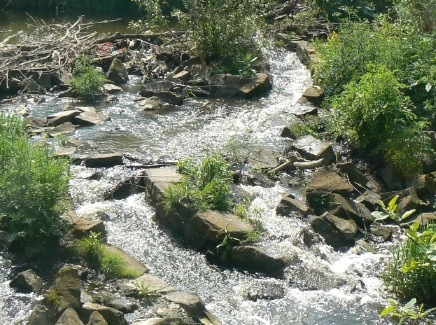
The Weir at Lock 5 at different water levels including 'high water' in January 2008, and the fish pass

The original route for the scheme continued along the Savick Brook into Haslam Park, and then followed the Sharoe Brook to reach the Lancaster Canal. However, delays to the start of the project meant that costs kept escalating, without an equivalent increase in funding, and constructing a route that ran alongside Tom Benson Way was a cheaper option. This new route created an impossibly tight turn after the road bridge, and so a turning basin would be needed a little further along the Savick Brook. The top three locks would be built as a three-rise staircase to lift the level of the navigation up to the level of the Lancaster Canal. When first planned the locks were to be 72 feet (22 m) long, but this was reduced to 62 feet (19 m) to save costs. However, this decision resulted in British Waterways receiving a number of complaints, and the Inland Waterways Association pledged £45,000 towards the extra cost for the longer locks. The Waterways Trust agree to match any funding provided by the Inland Waterways Association, and so the longer locks were reinstated at an additional cost of around £90,000. Because of the tidal nature of the lower Savick Brook, it was decided at the early stages of planning that the link would be designed for one way operation.

Much of the early engineering design work was carried out by the Babtie group, who had opened offices in Preston in the 1990s. The contract for the construction was awarded to the civil engineers Gleeson in November 2000, with Arup Water responsible for the detailed design. A partnership between British Waterways, Lancashire County Council, the Ribble Link Trust and The Waterways Trust were responsible for the management of the scheme. A separate company, The Ribble Link Construction and Operation Limited, was set up as a joint venture between the Ribble Link Trust and Lancashire County Council. Such a company was a requirement of the Millennium Commission, in order for them to release funds for the project. The Waterways Trust would be the owners of the new navigation, which would be built by Gleeson, with British Waterways acting as project managers. On completion, the navigation would be leased to British Waterways, who would then maintain it for 125 years. Just prior to work starting, the Ribble Link Construction and Operation company was handed over to the Waterways Trust, and all the original directors resigned. The Ribble Link Trust expressed disappointment at this, as they would no longer have any say in how the link was managed, despite having raised a lot of the funding for it, and been involved in its promotion for over 20 years.

=== Construction ===
Ground clearance began in February and March 2001, with the intention of constructing the lower end of the navigation first, but an outbreak of foot-and-mouth disease in March resulted in the surrounding agricultural land being closed for access. The middle of the route was not affected by access restrictions, and work began at lock 5 in May 2001. Once the piling was completed, the contractors moved on to lock 4. Both locks were built on dry ground between the neck of a meander. The design involved driving four rows of interlocking steel piles into the ground, using a vibrating pile driver to minimise the noise nuisance associated with such work. The inner two rows would form the lock walls, while the outer two were tied to them by steel rods to provide anchorage. Earth was then excavated from between the inner pair to form the lock chamber. Construction of the staircase locks 1, 2 and 3 began soon afterwards. The foot-and-mouth restrictions were lifted in July 2001, and work on the lower section then began.

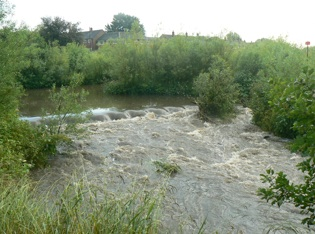
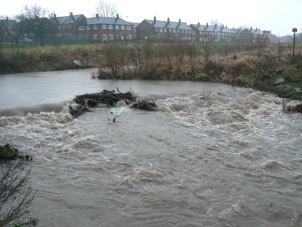
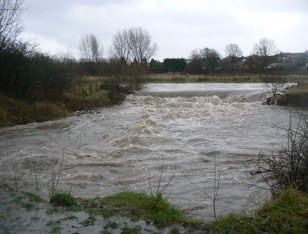
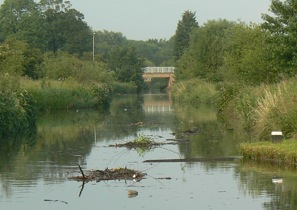
The Ribble Link acts as a storm drain for northwest Preston and is often in flood. This prevents boat traffic, restricting the number of days that it can be used each year.

While the locks were being constructed, the channel was widened, and in some places sharp bends were eased to ensure that boats could negotiate the turns. Lock 6 had to be built on the line of the Brook, and so a bywash was created, to enable the brook to continue to flow while the work was carried out. Lock 7 was built close to a new footbridge which had been built by the Waterway Recovery Group some years previously. The most difficult lock to build was Lock 8, as the site was affected by tides, which flooded the works of several occasions. Spoil removed from the lock site and the adjacent channel was spread on land nearby, whereas spoil from most of the excavations was removed by lorry to wasteland close to Preston Docks. Upstream of the lock, a farm bridge was replaced with a new structure, imported from Italy. The corrugated steel panels were bolted together and the structure was then craned into position. Prolonged heavy rain in late August resulted in extensive flooding, causing significant damage to the newly built banks, which were washed into the channel. A second flood occurred in mid-September, and a third on 8 October, all of which resulted in work having to be re-done.

The lock gates were built at the Northwich works of British Waterways, and were installed by engineers from British Waterways. Lock 9 consists of a single rotating gate, which is raised to retain water at a suitable level for navigation, and lowered into the bed of the canal to allow boats to pass when the level of the incoming tide reaches the level in the pound above the structure. In order to construct it, piling was used to create a coffer dam around the site. Once the concrete base had been poured, the gate was lowered into place. Near the top of the navigation, a footpath had once passed beneath the railway line, but the tunnel had been closed when the Tom Benson road was built. In order to reconnect the path, a steel walkway was attached to the side of the railway arch through which boats pass, for which permission had to be obtained from British Rail.

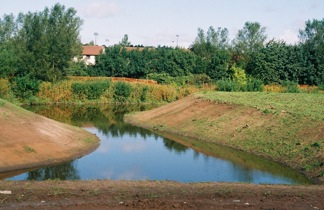
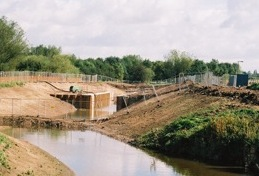
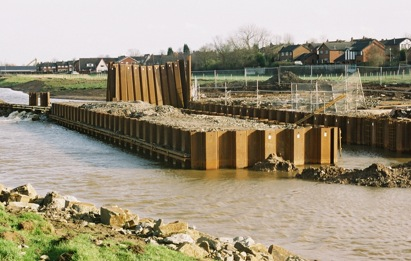
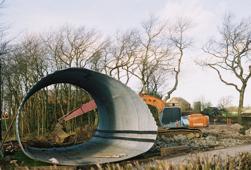
Construction – tight 'sbends', locks under construction and the pre-fabricated bridge waiting to be lowered into position

The bridge to carry the Lancaster Canal towpath over the connection basin entrance at the top of the canal arrived on site from the Netherlands on 26 March, but the delivery lorry could not get close enough to the site, and so it was not fitted until 3 April. Further flooding of the lower section occurred on 29 April as a result of heavy rain and a high spring tide, again resulting in significant damage to the works.

The coffer dam around the rotating sector gate was removed in June 2002, and in the same month, a British Waterways maintenance boat became the first vessel to use the waterway, when it moved from the Lancaster Canal into the connection basin above the staircase locks. A number of boats traversed the navigation in July 2002, in order to assist with the commissioning of the locks and to prove the methods of working. The boats were all owned by members of the Ribble Link Trust, who made their way from Preston Docks to the Lancaster Canal. Problems with the hydraulic swing bridge at the exit from the docks resulted in the boats leaving two hours later than expected, but a very high tide ensured that all the boats managed to pass through the sector gate before water levels dropped. The official opening took place on 20 September 2002, when Margaret Beckett, the Secretary of State for the Environment, Food and Rural Affairs, declared the navigation open.

=== Costs and funding ===
The Millennium Ribble Link was built to celebrate the new Millennium, and the final cost was £6.54 million, nearly twice the original estimate. The Millennium Commission offered £2.7 million towards the project, and they eventually contributed just over £3 million. The remaining £3.54 million was provided by amounts from 34 other organisations, including British Nuclear Fuels, British Waterways, operators of five landfill sites as part of the Landfill Tax Credit Scheme, The Waterways Trust, and The Ribble Link Trust. Costs escalated during the design phase, with an objection on environmental grounds from the Environment Agency, made on the day of the initial planning application, costing some £750,000 to resolve, and delaying the project by many months.

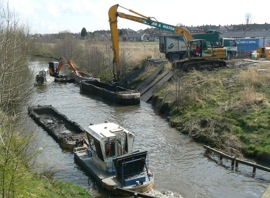
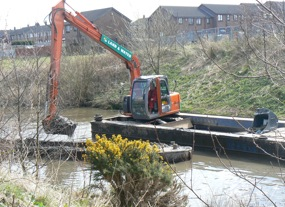
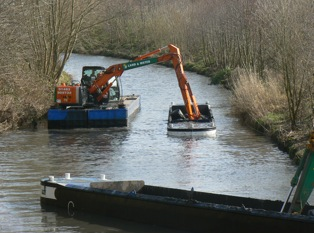
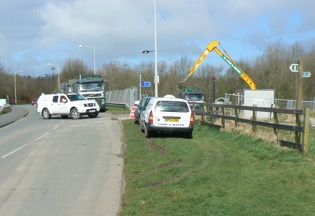
Annual dredging of the Ribble Link takes place in March/April at the start of the bird breeding season.

Originally £850,000 was set aside, primarily from Lancashire Waste Services Limited landfill tax credits for 125 years of maintenance. All of The Waterways Trust maintenance budget was used to fund the original over-spend and the period of maintenance reduced to 40 years.

British Waterways have spent over £2.1million on maintenance and keeping the navigation open in the first five years of operation. The Annual Report and Accounts of The Waterways Trust show a maintenance expenditure on the Ribble Link of £22,200 in 2005/6 from an income of £3,186,521 and £29,000 in 2006/7 from an income of £4,235,471.

Since it was opened, the Ribble Link had been expensive to maintain. It suffered from flooding during the winter of 2003–2004, resulting in a lot of material being depositied in the channel, and scouring of some of the bywash weirs. The link was closed and Land and Water were employed to carry out dredging in March 2004. This was hampered by low water levels due to damage to the bywash weirs and by water supplies being limited by other work taking place on the Lancaster Canal. The whole of the link needed to be dredged, and further flooding took place while the work was in progress. The cost of the operation was £124,576. The link was closed again during 2006, after voids appeared behind some of the lock structures. The work to fill the voids and to repair a lock bywash cost £360,000. Further dredging was required and cost £240,000. Some of this was achieved by conventional bucket dredging, where the material was removed and taken to landfill, but the use of 'cutter section' dredging was also trialled, after a licence was obtained from the Department for Environment, Food and Rural Affairs (DEFRA). This involved pumping the silt over the sea lock gate when the tide was going out so that it was carried into the Ribble, and following completion of the work, the link was re-opened on 6 April 2007. The effectiveness of cutter section dredging resulted in British Waterways applying for annual licences for the process. Sludge is brought into the lower section of the link by incoming tides, and is a known problem on the Ribble. The cost of dredging to maintain the route to Preston Docks was one of the main reasons why they were closed in October 1981.

=== Operation ===
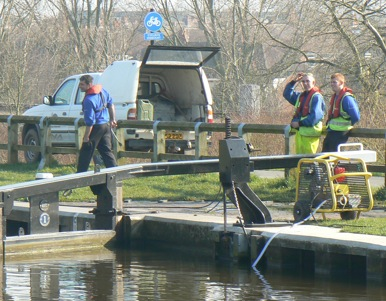
British Waterways staff are often at hand to assist a passage.

The Millennium Ribble Link follows a course to the north and west of the city of Preston along a canalisation of the Savick Brook, which is tidal along its lower reaches. The channel has been straightened and widened to allow navigation by boats with a maximum beam of 10.5 feet (3.2 m). One bank of the brook has been left with reed edges, to minimise the disturbance to wildlife, and artificial sand cliffs have been established where those used by nesting sand martins had to be removed as part of the engineering works. In addition to use by boats, a primary aim of the project was to create a resource which could be enjoyed and used by walkers, cyclists and anglers. There are footpaths along its banks for most of its length, and the arts trail was part of the vision to make exploring it more interesting.

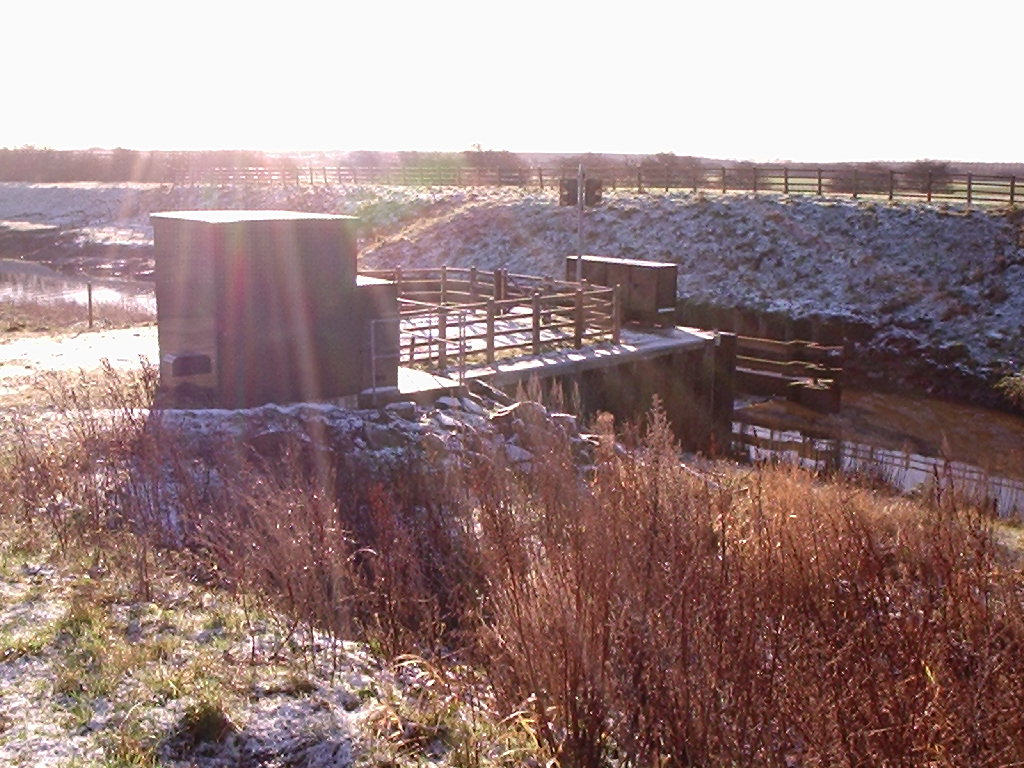
The rotating sector gate just before the canal joins the Ribble

The link, which is around 4 miles (6.4 km) long from the junction with the Ribble to the junction with the Lancaster Canal, is normally only open in the summer months between April and mid-October. However, its use is restricted by the times of tides and by wind and weather conditions, and it is therefore only accessible for a limited number of days during this period. All boats wanting to use the link must pre-book a passage, by contacting the Canal and River Trust in advance. It is only operated in one direction on any one day. The sea lock at the Ribble end and the triple staircase at the Lancaster Canal end are manned by Canal and River Trust staff, whereas the rest of the locks are unmanned and are operated by boat crews. In 2022, passages could be booked on 71 days during the open season, and the number of boats that could be accommodated was restricted to four rather than six on two days when the height of the tide was at the minimum at which the link can be accessed. Generally, the direction of travel was the same for three of four days, and was then reversed for the next three or four days.

While the Ribble Link officially refers to the canalised Savick Brook, it has also come to mean the entire passage from the upgraded facilities at Tarleton on the Rufford Arm of the Leeds and Liverpool Canal, travelling down 4 miles (6.4 km) of the River Douglas to the Ribble, the journey for 3.5 miles (5.6 km) up the River Ribble, and the new link to the Lancaster Canal.

The entrance to the Savick Brook is controlled by a green light, signifying that it is safe to proceed along the link to the rotating sea lock. Boats may have to wait until tide levels are correct for the gate to be opened, and once through the gate it will be closed to retain water in the channel as the tide drops. There is a pontoon upstream of the gate where boats may have to wait again until water levels beneath Savick Bridge fall sufficiently to allow passage beneath it. The Canal and River Trust will only accept bookings for days when the tide is between 28 and 31 feet (8.6 and 9.6 m), when wind speeds are below 4 or 5 on the Beaufort scale and when visibility is good.

When first opened, there was a charge for using the Ribble Link, but in February 2003, British Waterways announced that all charges for using the link and for other structures including the Anderton Boat Lift, the Falkirk Wheel and Standedge Canal Tunnel would be funded from licence fees. There is thus no charge to use the link for boats with a full Canal and River Trust licence. Pleasure craft on hire are charged £60 per passage (each way). A Skippers Guide is published by the Canal and River Trust and is normally available on their web site. Because the Ribble is tidal, boats making the crossing are required to carry extra safety equipment, over and above that which is necessary for cruising on inland waterways.

Crossing the Ribble involves navigating on tidal waters, and is inevitably a little more difficult than navigating an inland waterway. There is a relatively small window when tide levels are correct to use the sea lock at the start of the link, and this dictates the times that boats are allowed through the lock at Tarleton for the start of the journey. A maximum of six boats are allowed to make the journey on any one tide, but that normally ensures that boats can travel in convoy. The journey down the River Douglas is against the incoming tide, and engines will be required to work hard for up to four hours. If this results in the engine overheating, boaters are advised to run some hot water, to help cool it down. Most crossings are completed without incident, but slower boats or those making the crossing on a neap tide may arrive at the Savick Brook when there is insufficient water to use the sea lock, and may be diverted to Preston Docks, 1.5 miles (2.4 km) further up the Ribble. Although most boats make the journey successfully, there has been an increase in callouts to the emergency services to aid boats that have got into difficulty. The Royal National Lifeboat Institution (RNLI) station at Lytham St Annes received five callouts in a two-month period in 2009. When a boat has become stuck on a mudbank, the normal course of action is to wait 12 hours until the next tide, when it can be refloated, but this often involves the RNLI returning late at night or early in the morning, to help the boat get to Preston Docks.

The Ribble Link Operation and Maintenance company continued to own the navigation, with British Waterways operating it on their behalf. However, in October 2011, the government announced the proposal to replace British Waterways with a charitable trust, the Canal and River Trust. Since the objectives of both trusts were similar, talks took place between them, and a decision to merge them was made. The takeover took place on 26 July 2012, and since then, the Canal and River Trust has been responsible for all aspects of the link. The Canal and River Trust state that boat sizes are restricted to 62 feet (19 m) long and 10.5 feet (3.2 m) wide. The length is not based on the size of the locks, which are 72 feet (22 m) long, but the difficulty of navigating some of the bends in a longer boat, in view of the restricted channel width. Most vessels that use the Ribble Link travel along the Rufford Branch of the Leeds and Liverpool Canal, and the locks on that section can only accommodate 62-foot (19 m) boats.

== Course ==
The Millennium Ribble Link was Great Britain's first inland waterway to be constructed in nearly 100 years when it was opened in July 2002, and was the first to be built for leisure purposes only, rather than for commercial use. Use of the link is restricted, as it is only open between April and mid-October, and the direction of travel changes on alternate days. The 4-mile (6.4 km) link connects the once-isolated Lancaster Canal to the River Ribble, from where it is possible to reach the main navigable system via the River Douglas and the Leeds and Liverpool Canal's Rufford Branch. Use of the Ribble is subject to tides and weather conditions. The Millennium Commission requested that the link should include an art trail, and five works of art were installed. The top four were produced by the sculptor Thompson Dagnall, and were collectively known as Gauging the Ripple. A fifth one, also produced by Dagnall, was located near the bottom of the link. Because the link was partly funded by the Millennium Commission, they were keen that it should include features that would benefit the wider community, rather than just boaters, and so it was marketed as a linear water park, with cycle routes, footpaths, leisure areas and the arts trail, all of which were designed to attract visitors to the facility, and generate economic returns for the local community. Footpaths run from the Lancaster Canal along the Ribble Link as far as Goodier Bridge, just short of Lock 8.

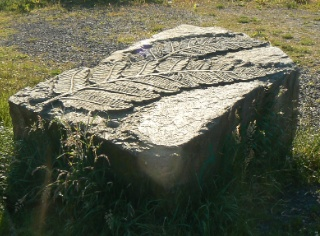
The Fire Sculpture adjacent to Lock 4 is part of the Ribble Link Sculpture trail, by the artist Thompson Dagnall

The junction with the Lancaster Canal is 1.4 miles (2.3 km) from the Preston end of the canal. Boats accessing the link pass under a towpath bridge to enter a holding basin. This leads to a three-lock staircase, which is operated by Canal and River Trust staff, and so boaters must wait in the basin until instructed to proceed. The top lock is overlooked by the first of five sculptures that form the sculpture trail. It was originally a giant wooden statue of a man, representing 'Water', but this was removed in 2008 when the wood decayed. In 2014 it was replaced by a steel sculpture produced by the sculptor Denis O’Connor of Derby. It consists of a stainless steel canal boat, with the tools used to construct canals in the 19th century, on top of a corten steel column. At the bottom of the staircase there is another basin, which boats use to turn around ready for the descent of the next locks. The Savick Brook enters the basin from the east, and the link continues to the west following the original line of the Savick Brook. To reach the basin, the brook has passed through an aqueduct carrying the Lancaster Canal, which was constructed in 1797 by John Rennie, and then flowed through the grade II listed Haslem Park. This was opened in 1910, and was a gift to the people of Preston by Mary Haslem, in memory of her father John, who owned a local cotton mill. She was particularly keen that the park should cater for the needs of children. The park includes a lake fed by water from the Lancaster Canal.

The link passes under the B6241 Tom Benson Way, immediately followed by a bridge carrying the Blackpool South branch line from Preston to Salwick, before it reaches the first of the boater-operated locks. Surplus water bypasses Lock 4 via a weir and a meander to the north of the site. The sculpture 'Fire' by Dagnall, a large block of stone polished with graphite to make it look like coal and engraved with a fossilised fern on the top, is close to the lock. The link is crossed by Savick Way before it reaches Lock 5, where the weir and meander are similar in layout to that at Lock 4. To the north of this section is a quiet public park, while to the south is the 'hay meadow', part of the Ribble Link Development, identified as being of 'national significance'. Public access is approved and welcomed. The third of Dagnall's sculptures representing 'Air', consisting of two interlocking tree trunks straddling the towpath was close to Lock 5 but was removed in 2009.

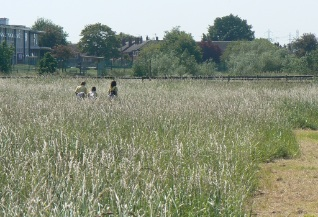
In 2009, 7 years after opening, British Waterways began providing public access to the Hay Meadow for public appreciation

The Ribble Link continues under Leyland Bridge, which carries Lea Road, and then enters a flood plain, with housing to the south and agricultural fields to the north. A small stream called Lady Head Runnel flows southwards to join the brook. Beyond this is Lock 6 and its weir, where a sculpture representing 'Earth' consists of reclaimed gritstone slabs set into the towpath, with large footprints carved into them. The footprints are two and a half time life size, to represent those of the man at Lock 1. Tudor Avenue bridge provides access to New House Farm and the Ashton and Lea Golf Club, both of which are on the north bank of the brook. A footbridge carries a public footpath over the brook before it reaches Lock 7 with its weir, again feeding surplus water around the north side of the structure. A cycle path runs along the south bank of the brook until another footpath crosses at Goodier Bridge. Just before Lock 8 is a holding basin, where floating pontoons are available for mooring, until permission to proceed down the tidal section below the lock and to use the sea lock is given.

There is a pumping station on the left bank operated by British Nuclear Fuels, followed by a copse of semi-ancient woodland and a Biological Heritage Site reedbed at Savick Bridge, which carries the main A583 road. The wooden sculpture 'Rook' by Thompson Dagnall is located on the north bank, and can also be seen from the A583 road. Deepdale Brook joins on the right bank, and the river is crossed by the A583 road. The sea lock is a short distance below the bridge, and the brook continues to the west of Lea Marsh, until it reaches the River Ribble. Preston Docks marina is upstream from the junction, on the north bank of the Ribble, and the River Douglas, which provides the route to the Rufford branch of the Leeds and Liverpool Canal is downstream, on the south bank.

== Background ==
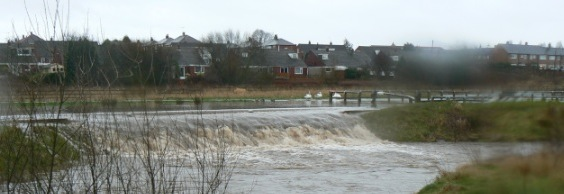
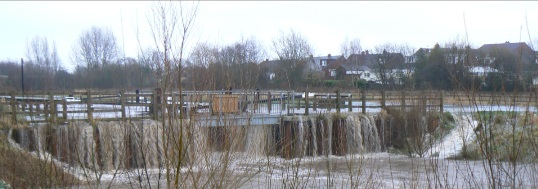
Flooding at Lock 4 in January 2008, when Savick Brook burst its bank and overflowed the lock

The River Ribble and the Savick Brook Ribble Link are subject to outfall from a number of sources, including the Springfields nuclear fuel production facility at Salwick, to the north of Savick Bridge. A research project by the University of Portsmouth was carried out to test low cost tools for measuring water quality, with one of the pilot studies carried out on the Ribble. This was known to have failed to meet Environmental Quality Standards, due to the presence of heavy metals, organic compounds and organo-metallic compounds. The Environment Agency take samples from the estuary once a month to monitor the water quality, but the research project took samples from many more monitoring points including on the Ribble Link. Research carried out in 2006 looked at the effects of radioactive discharges from the Springfields site on those working, living or finding recreation in the locality. The site produced fuel for Magnox reactors, pressurised water reactors and advanced gas-cooled reactors at the time of the survey, although the production of Maxnox fuel ceased in 2007. Radionuclides are discharged to the air and in liquids into the environment, with levels of radionuclides dropping significantly since Maxnox fuel production stopped. At the time the site was owned by the Nuclear Decommissioning Authority, and operated by Springfield Fuels Ltd Westinghouse. The Ribble Link between the sea lock and lock 8 was studied as part of the aquatic survey. Sediments dredged from this section during construction were used to landscape the north-west bank of the brook, and these were tested for beta emissions. The report recommended that testing for beta and gamma dose rates could be introduced on the section of the Ribble Link below the sea lock, where beta dose rates were found to be relatively high.

The Banded Demoiselle, one of the largest and most colourful of the damselflies, has long been known from the Cuerden Valley Park. For many years this was thought to be its only Lancashire locality. However, during the late 1990s a considerable expansion of its range took place. The insect reached the Savick Brook, west of Preston, in 1997 and, by 1999, was well established there. In 1998, it was recorded on the Lancaster Canal north of Preston and also on the Leeds and Liverpool Canal at Withnell Fold.

== See also ==
- List of waterway societies in the United Kingdom

== Bibliography ==
- Allan, Ian J; et al. (2005). "Pilot river basin case study - the Ribble estuary" (PDF). Gentronix. Archived from the original (PDF) on 9 October 2011.
- Butler, Roger (July 2009). "The RIbble Link Hands On". Waterways World. ISSN 0309-1422.
- Barnett, Neil (July 2020). "Linked In". Waterways World. ISSN 0309-1422.
- Clegg, John (September 1999). "Editorial". Ripples Volume 5 No 7. Archived from the original on 8 September 2022.
- Clegg, John (22 December 2001). "Newsfile". Ribble Link Trust. Archived from the original on 7 September 2022.
- Clegg, John (29 March 2003). "Latest News". Ribble Link Trust. Archived from the original on 6 September 2022.
- Coxah, M (2001). "Archaeological Evaluation at Mill Field, Lee Gate" (PDF). University of Bournemouth. Archived from the original (PDF) on 18 June 2013.
- CRT (2016). "Millennium Ribble Link Skipper Guide" (PDF). Canal & River Trust. Archived (PDF) from the original on 27 October 2020.
- Cumberlidge, Jane (2009). Inland Waterways of Great Britain (8th ed.). Imray Laurie Norie and Wilson. ISBN 978-1-84623-010-3.
- Denny, Andrew (October 2022). "What's that strange feature?". Waterways World. ISSN 0309-1422.
- Fazackerley, Chris (April 1998). "Chairman's report". Ripples Volume 5 No 1. Archived from the original on 8 September 2022.
- Fazackerley, Chris (March 1999). "Chairman's report". Ripples Volume 5 No 5. Archived from the original on 8 September 2022.
- Fazackerley, Chris (April 2000). "Chairman's report". Ripples Volume 5 No 9. Archived from the original on 8 September 2022.
- Fazackerley, Chris (April 2001). "Chairman's report". Ripples Volume 6 No 2. Archived from the original on 9 September 2022.
- Fazackerley, Chris (2018). The Millenium Ribble Link. Ribble Link Trust. ISBN 978-1-79195-624-0.
- Hadfield, Charles; Biddle, Gordon (1970). The Canals of North West England, Vol 1 (pp.1-236). David and Charles. ISBN 978-0-7153-4956-4.
- Oldfield, Rebecca; Charlesworth, David (March 2002). "Savick Brook Electrofishing Survey 2001" (PDF). Environment Agency. Archived (PDF) from the original on 26 February 2021.
- Phillips, Chloe (11 April 2022). "Preston's Old Tram Bridge could be revived". Place North West. Archived from the original on 8 May 2022.
- Squires, Roger (2008). Britain's restored canals. Landmark Publishing. ISBN 978-1-84306-331-5.
- Tipple, J R; et al. (2007). "Radiological Habits Survey: Springfields, 2006" (PDF). Centre for Environment, Fisheries & Aquaculture Science. Archived from the original (PDF) on 7 June 2011.
- Whalley, Pete (December 2009). "Emergency on the Ribble!". Waterways World. ISSN 0309-1422.
