= Thompson Dagnall =

British sculptor

Thompson Dagnall is a British sculptor.

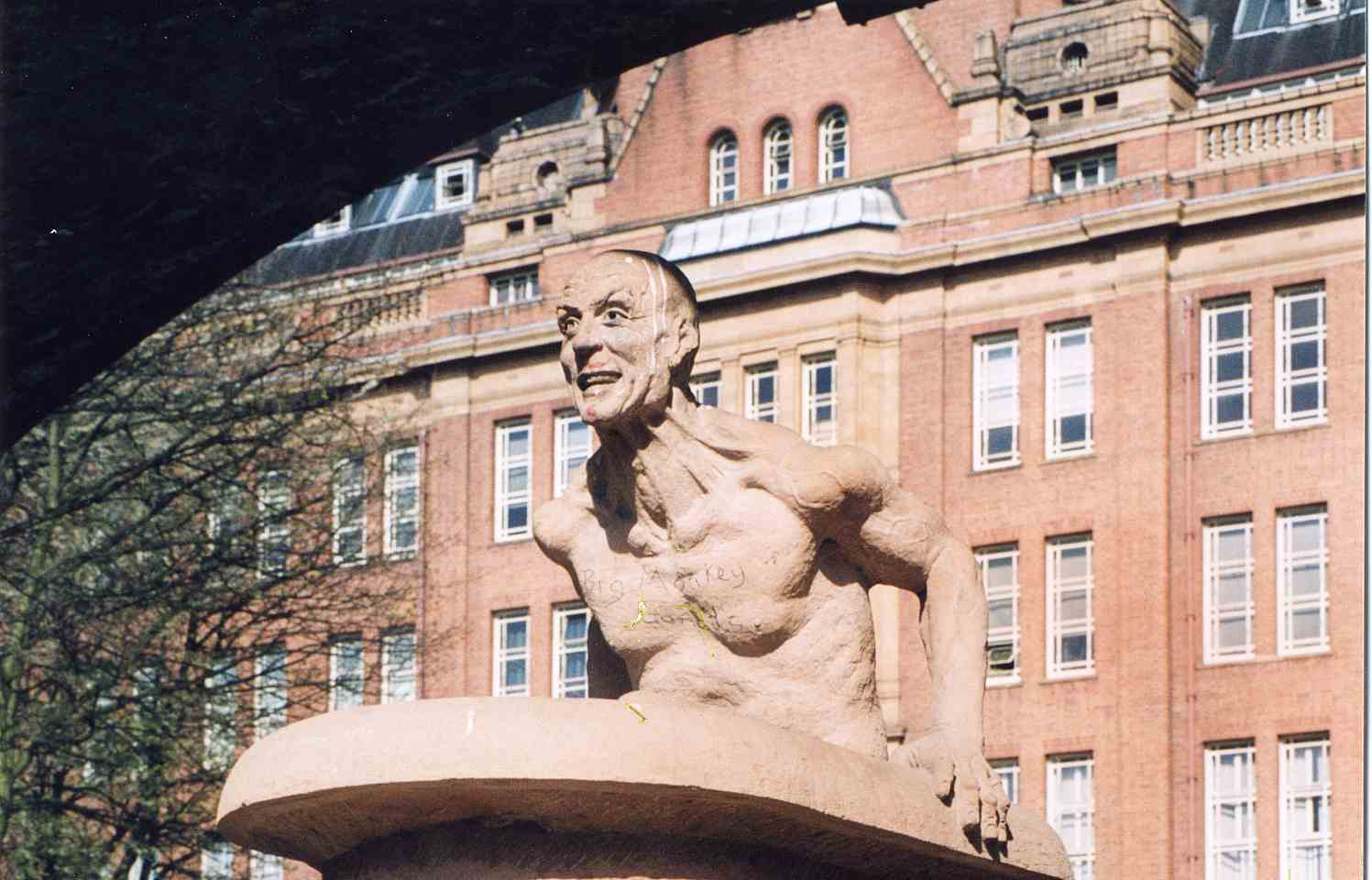
Archimedes Statue, Manchester

Born in Liverpool on 15 February 1956, he attended Liverpool and Brighton Polytechnics before gaining an MA at Chelsea College in 1979.

He is a prolific producer of works on public commission, including Archimedes and Luca Pacioli in Manchester; Halsall Navvy in Halsall; Black Tiger and Kissing Seat, Walking Snake, Hanging Bat, Spruced up Heron and Orme Sight in Beacon Fell Country Park; and Gauging the Ripple by the Ribble Link canal in Preston (nicknamed the "Ribble Piddler").

In his early career, he carved nudes with his first clothed piece being a sculpture of cricketer Don Bradman in 1985
