= Westmoreland Canals Act 1792 =

Act of the Parliament of Great Britain

- Act of Parliament
- Parliament of Great Britain
- Long title: An Act for making and maintaining a Navigable Canal from Kirkby Kendal, in the County of Westmorland, to West Houghton, in the County Palatine of Lancaster; and also a Navigable Branch from the said intended Canal at or near Borwick, to or near Watron Cragg; and also another Navigable Branch from, at, or near Gale Moss, by Chorley, to or near Duxbury, in the said County Palatine of Lancaster.
- Citation: 32 Geo. 3. c. 101
- Territorial extent: Great Britain

Dates
- Royal assent: 11 June 1792
- Commencement: 31 January 1792 (Note: Start of session.)
Other legislation
Amended by	Lancaster Canal Act 1793; Lancaster Canal Navigation Act 1807; Lancaster Canal Navigation Act 1819; Lancaster Canal Transfer Act 1864; Leeds and Liverpool Canal Act 1891

Status: Amended

Text of statute as originally enacted

The Westmoreland Canals Act 1792 (32 Geo. 3. c. 101) is an act of the Parliament of Great Britain passed in 1792. It authorised the construction of the Lancaster Canal between Kendal in Westmorland (now Cumbria) and Wigan in Lancashire (now Greater Manchester).

The opening paragraph reads:

"An Act for making and maintaining a Navigable Canal from Kirkby Kendal, in the County of Westmorland, [sic] to West Houghton, in the County Palatine of Lancaster; and also a Navigable Branch from the said intended Canal at or near Borwick, to or near Watron Cragg; and also another Navigable Branch from, at, or near Gale Moss, by Chorley, to or near Duxbury, in the said County Palatine of Lancaster".

== See also ==
- Lancaster Canal Tramroad

== Bibliography ==
- Barritt, S. (2000) The Old Tramroad - Walton Summit to Preston Basin, Lancaster : Carnegie, ISBN 1-85936-058-0
