= Preston Riverside railway station =

Railway station in Preston, Lancashire, England

Preston Riverside
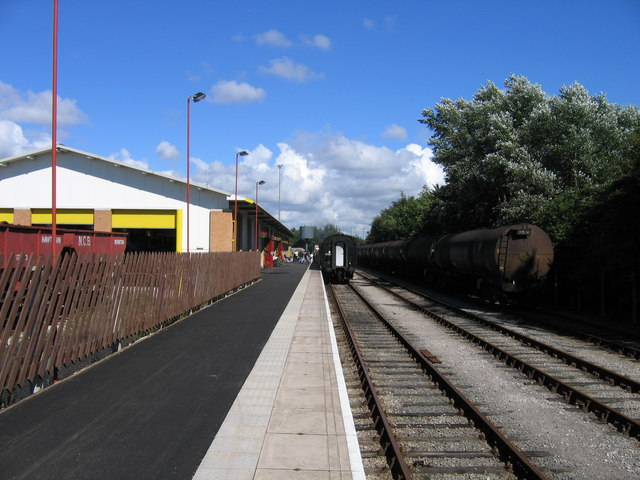
- Museum, platform, and storage sidings

General information
- Location: Riversway, Preston; England
- Coordinates: 53.75876°N 2.75379°W
- Grid reference: SD503294
- System: Station on heritage railway
- Manager: Ribble Steam Railway
- Platforms: 1

History
- Opened: 2005
Location

Preston Riverside railway station is the only station on the heritage Ribble Steam Railway, in Riversway, Preston, Lancashire, England. It was built and opened in 2005, adjacent to the museum and workshops, while providing a heritage service to Strand Road Crossing.

The basic station is one platform, which can accommodate 5 coaches, built onto the side of the museum of the railway. Opposite the station, there is a single siding for storage of bitumen tanks, and one run-round loop. There is very little on the actual station, however there are a couple of plant pots, benches and information displays.

Services from the station are hourly, and they go to the Strand Road Crossing. These services are only available during the railway operating season and on special events.

Preceding station	Heritage railways	Following station
Terminus	Ribble Steam Railway	Strand Road Crossing
