= Riversway =

Former ward in Preston, Lancashire, England

Coordinates: 53.762°N 2.752°W

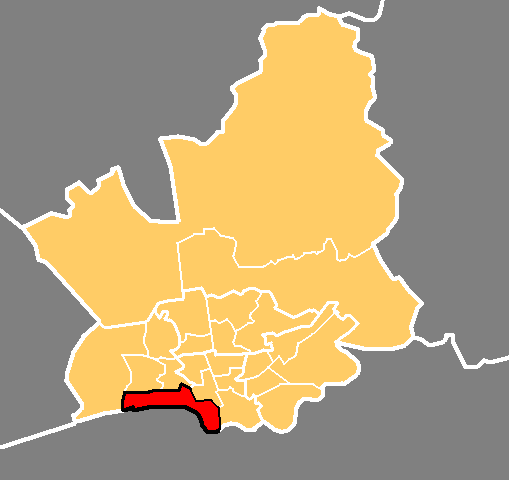
- Location in the City of Preston district

- Location in Preston Location within Lancashire
- Population: 6,351 (2011)
- District: City of Preston
- Ceremonial county: Lancashire
- Region: North West
- Country: England
- Sovereign state: United Kingdom
- UK Parliament: Preston

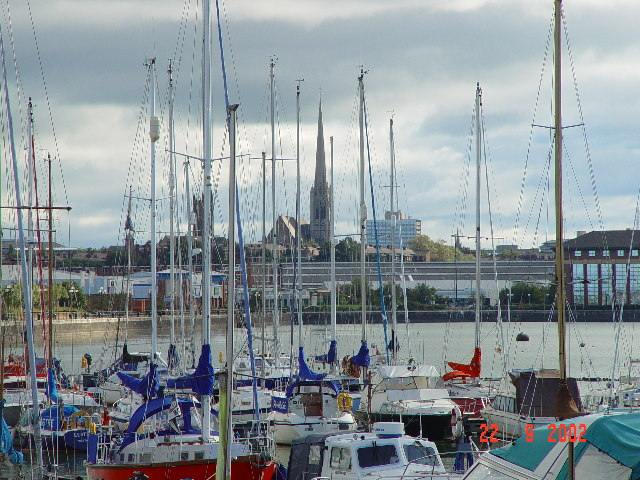
A view from the docklands towards St Walburge's Church

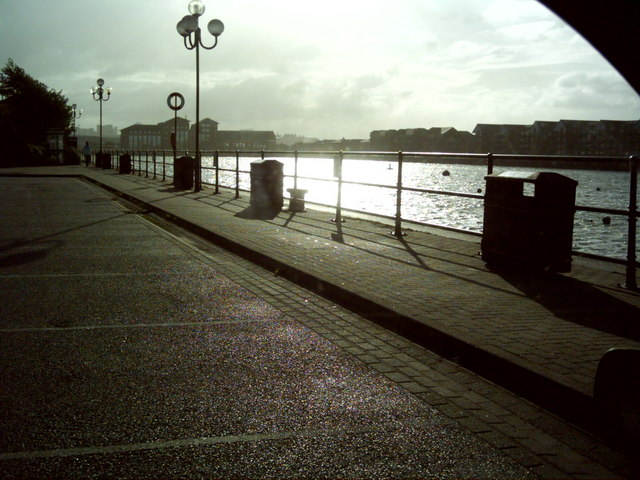
Another view of the former docks

Riversway was an electoral ward in Preston, Lancashire, England. The ward was named for its location close to the River Ribble, and the historical links to the former Port of Preston. The ward comprised three distinct areas; the former Docklands, now a shopping area and residential community, with new build apartments and housing overlooking the dock; Broadgate, the residential area built during the Industrial Revolution; and Christ Church, a community of traditional terraced housing.

The ward contained the administrative headquarters of Lancashire County Council.

Riversway returned three members to Preston City Council, elected 'in thirds' in first past the post elections each year.

The ward formed part of the Lancashire County Council electoral division of Preston City.

The ward was abolished for the 2019 Preston City Council election. The Docklands area was transferred to Ashton ward; areas east of the A582 Strand Road/Guild Way became part of the new City Centre ward.

== Demographics ==
From the 2001 census, Riversway ward had a population of 5,823. Of this figure, just over half (53.9) described themselves as Christian. With 11% and 10% respectively, the Hindu and Muslim populations are amongst the largest in the city; a Hindu temple is within the Broadgate area of the ward. Riversway had a population of 6351 in 2011. Here is a 2011 ethnic breakdown of the ward.

Riversway Compared 2011	Riversway	City of Preston
White British	64.5%	75.7%
Other White	6.8%	3.5%
Asian	21.3%	15.5%
Black	1.9%	1.2%

== Geography ==
The ward was in the southwest of the city, curving along the route of the Ribble from Broadgate to the docklands, where the river eventually meets the Fylde coast, and ultimately the Irish Sea. The ward featured the terrace streets and student hostels along Fishergate Hill towards Preston railway station, the Royal Mail sorting office, and many shops and businesses along the docklands development. The Penwortham by-pass was in this ward, joining the campus of the University of Central Lancashire to traffic on the western side of the city.

Riversway was also the home of the Ribble Steam Railway and its own railway station.

== See also ==
- Preston local elections

== Sources ==
SI confirming the existence of Riversway
