= Ribble Steam Railway =

Heritage railway and museum in Lancashire, England

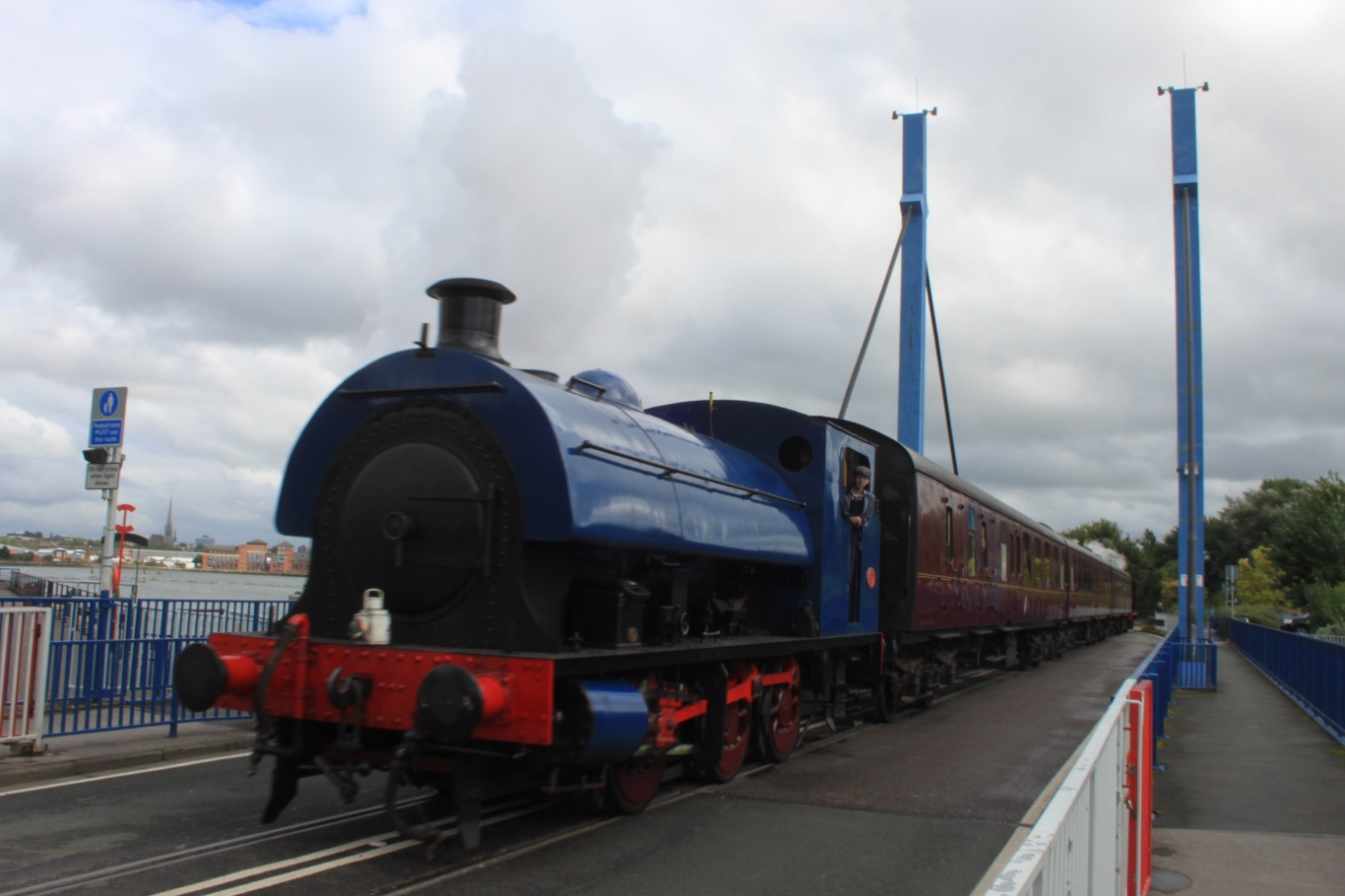
- Linda crossing the swing bridge
- Locale: Preston, Lancashire, England
- Terminus: Riversway

Commercial operations
- Name: Ribble Branch Line
- Built by: North Union Railway
- Original gauge: 4 ft 8 1/2 in (1,435 mm) standard gauge

Preserved operations
- Operated by: Ribble Steam Railway
- Stations: 1
- Length: 1 1/2 miles (2.4 km)
- Preserved gauge: 4 ft 8 1/2 in (1,435 mm) standard gauge

Commercial history
- Opened: 1882; 144 years ago
- Closed: 1990s

Preservation history
- Opened: 2005

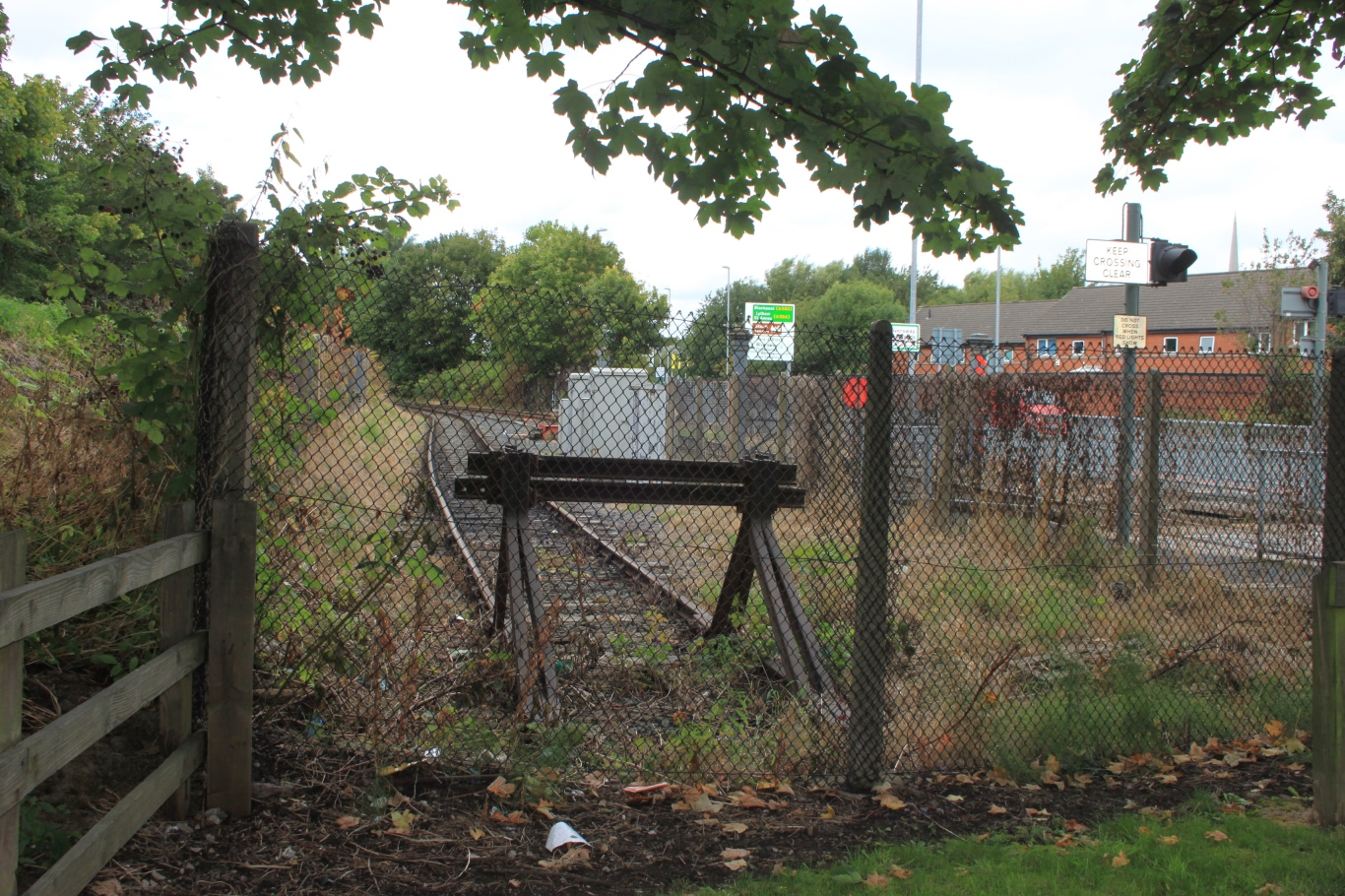
The Ribble Steam railway terminus at Strand Road

The Ribble Steam Railway is a standard gauge preserved railway in Preston, Lancashire, England. It was opened to the public on 17 September 2005, running along Preston Docks. The railway began by housing much of the collection from the previously closed Southport Railway Museum (Steamport), which was based in the old Lancashire and Yorkshire Railway engine shed at Southport (BR shed code 27C).

The railway lines around Preston Dock largely fell into disuse after the closure of the docks. A preservation group that was operating in Southport relocated to Preston in 1999 and started operations as the Ribble Steam Railway in 2005. Its operations base is at Preston Riverside but they run trains as far as Strand Road although there is no facility for locomotives to run round their train here.

The Riverside station is quite a way from Preston city centre, but proposals have been made for a platform to be constructed at Strand Road. This would be close to the Portway terminus of the Preston park and ride service, Guild Wheel walking trail and the River Ribble.

== History ==
The project was first started in 1973, a preservation centre opened in Southport, on the former Lancashire and Yorkshire Railway steam shed at Derby Road. However, the shed was becoming a costly burden to handle for the museum, so a relocation scheme was started. Preston Docks was chosen as the new location for the museum. Preston Docks has a large railway network, that used to serve the vast docks and quays. But when the docks closed, the railway was not used. The project finally closed the Southport Railway Museum in 1999.

The project's new site now could be re-developed with new large workshops, platforms and a museum. The first building to open was the workshop, in 2001. Locomotives could now go into the building, and more space could now be utilised. Next to the workshop, is the machine shop, built in 1978. At the other end of the workshop is the visitor centre, which contains the museum, cafe, shop and railway platform. The museum was finally completed in 2004. The collection of locomotives (61, one on loan from the National Railway Museum, one from the Lancashire and Yorkshire Railway Trust. 55 are currently on site.), is one of the largest collection of locomotives in the United Kingdom.

== Operations ==
The museum also operates passenger services to Strand Road Crossing and back, from its own station – Preston Riverside. The frequency of its trains is hourly, and are usually made up of two or more Mark 1 coaches and a small steam engine or diesel engine.

== Future ==
There have also been plans to extend the railway to the Ribble Link canal. The route would offer 1.5 miles extra to the line, although plans for this have not been finalised as major funding streams need to be found, in order to raise the huge quantity of funds required for such a significant project.

== Strand Road Crossing ==
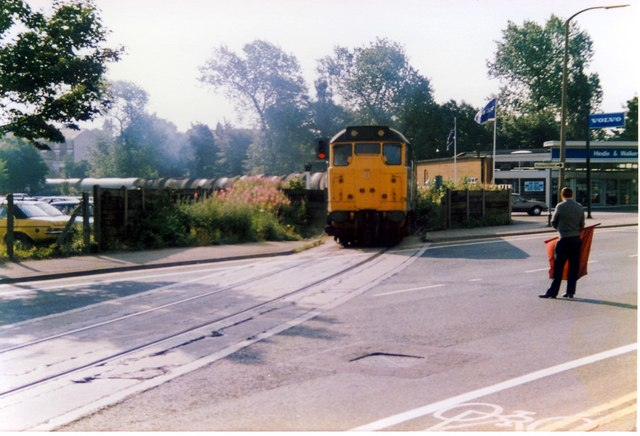
A train crossing Strand Road towards the docks in 1989

Strand Road Crossing (53°45′21″N 2°43′3″W) is a level crossing in Preston, Lancashire. It is situated on a freight-only branch line from Preston railway station which is used by trains serving Preston Docks. The Ribble Steam Railway terminates adjacent to the level crossing and it is proposed that a station should be built on the site.

Preceding station	Heritage railways	Following station
Preston Riverside	Ribble Steam Railway	Terminus

=== Freight traffic ===
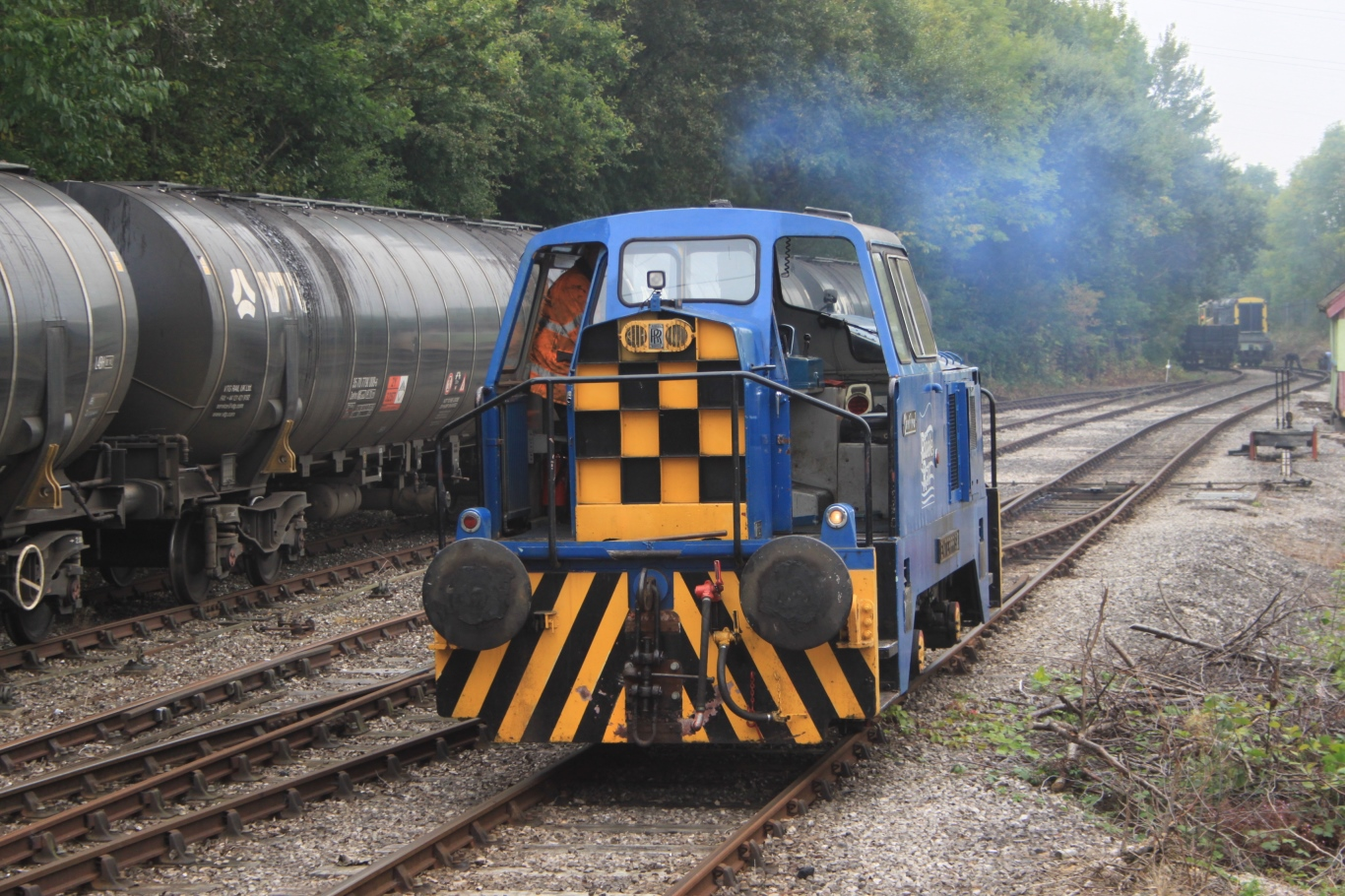
A Ribble Rail locomotive and bitumen tank wagons

The only regular freight traffic on the line was to deliver bitumen, transported using a consist of 15 tank wagons from Lindsey Oil Refinery, Lincolnshire to Total's Preston facility, three times weekly. After crossing the road it was taken a short distance to a group of three railway tracks. The main line locomotive switches to a train of empty wagons while a small diesel locomotive takes the full train on to the Lanfina Siding which is adjacent to Lockside Road near Preston Riverside station. The Lanfina sidings are located across the road (Chain Caul Way) from Total's Bitumen works at Lanfina house, where product was pumped from the tankers to the facility via an overhead gantry. This practice came to an end in January 2025, when deliveries switched to road transport.

== See also ==
- Riversway
- Riversway railway station
- Strand Road Crossing
- Preston
- List of transport museums
