= Transport in Preston =

City in England

Preston is a city in Lancashire, around 50 kilometres (31 mi) north-west of Manchester. Its public transport consists of buses and trains and has the guild wheel a 21 mile path around the city.

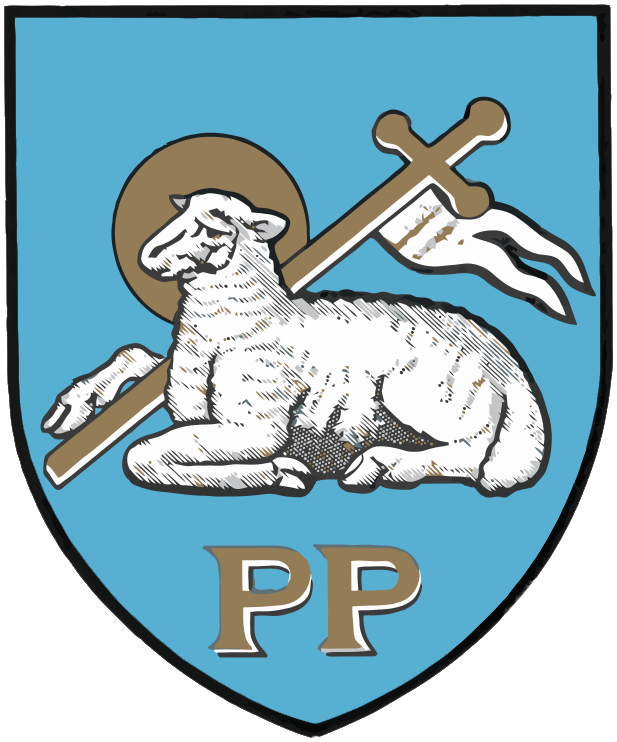
The City Emblem

== Road ==
=== Motorways ===
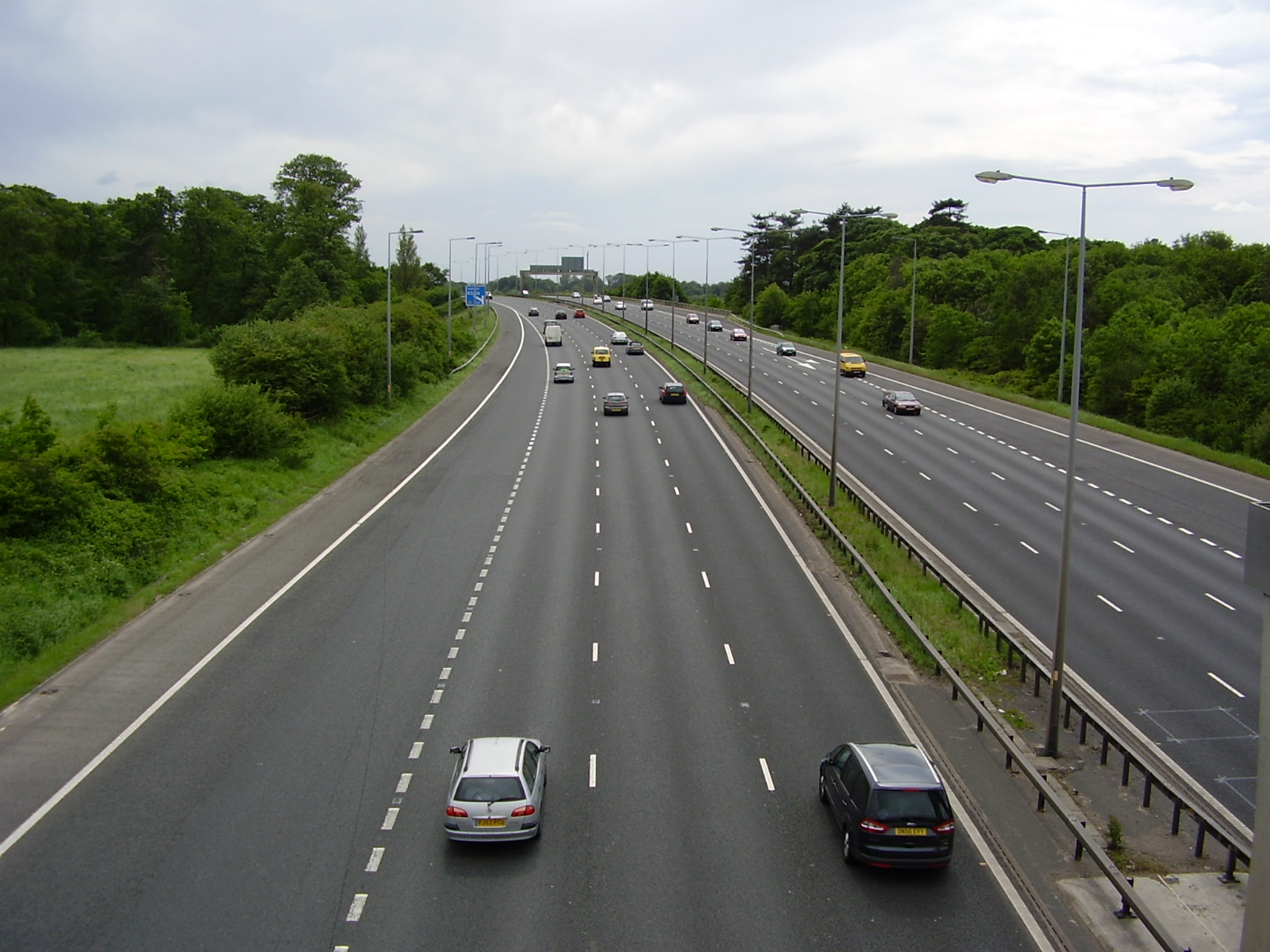
The M6 from J29 (A6 Preston South)

The Preston By-pass was the first part of the M6 Motorway, the longest motorway in the country. It was made a motorway in 1958, being the first motorway in the United Kingdom. It is now the stretch between Junction 29 (A6 and M65, Bamber Bridge) and Junction 1 of the M55 (A6 Preston North), with four intermediate junctions – J30, J31, J31A and J32. The other motorway within the city is the M55 (Preston – Blackpool), and it is also served by the M65 (Preston – East Lancashire) and M61 (Preston – Manchester), which connect to the M6 south of Preston.

=== A Roads ===
Preston has many major A roads running through it. The longest one is the A6, which comes from Lancaster in the north, runs down the centre and goes south-east towards Chorley. The A6 connects Carlisle to Luton, being the second longest road in Britain. Another A road that runs through Preston is the A59, which comes from the south-west from Liverpool towards Clitheroe in the north-east. Other A roads converging in Preston or its outskirts include the A49, A582, A583, A584, A675, A677, A5072 and A5085.

=== Others ===
The B6241 is a circular route around the north of the city via Ashton-on-Ribble, Cottam, Fulwood and Brookfield. Other main roads include the B6243 connecting Preston to Longridge, the B6242 Watling Street Road and B5411 Tag Lane.

== Rail ==
Railway station
Heritage railway station
Site of former railway station
Railway station
Heritage railway station
Site of former railway station

Preston used to have many railway lines and many stations around the city, but most of these closed, leaving only four: Preston, Salwick, Bamber Bridge and Lostock Hall. The latter three only have one hourly train to Preston or Colne.

Preston railway station is a major station on the West Coast Main Line, and also has routes going across North-West England.

Preston is the home of the heritage Ribble Steam Railway, located in the Riversway area.

The old railways to Longridge and Southport were closed in 1930 and 1960 respectively. The disused tracks to Longridge exist as far to Deepdale

Nearby stations are Leyland and Croston.

Train services are run by Avanti West Coast, TransPennine Express and Northern.

== Cycling ==
Preston has many cycling paths, including the Guild Wheel, a 21-mile circular route opened in 2012.

== Bus ==
Preston has an extensive network of Buses, the main operators being Preston Bus and Stagecoach. However a few other operators serve the city. Between 2006 and 2009, there was great competition between Stagecoach North West in Lancashire (branded as Preston Citi) and Preston Bus, which until 1993 had been owned by the Borough Council, culminating in the acquisition of Preston Bus by Stagecoach. After intervention from the Competition Commission, Stagecoach sold Preston Bus to Rotala in 2011.

=== Operators ===
==== Stagecoach ====
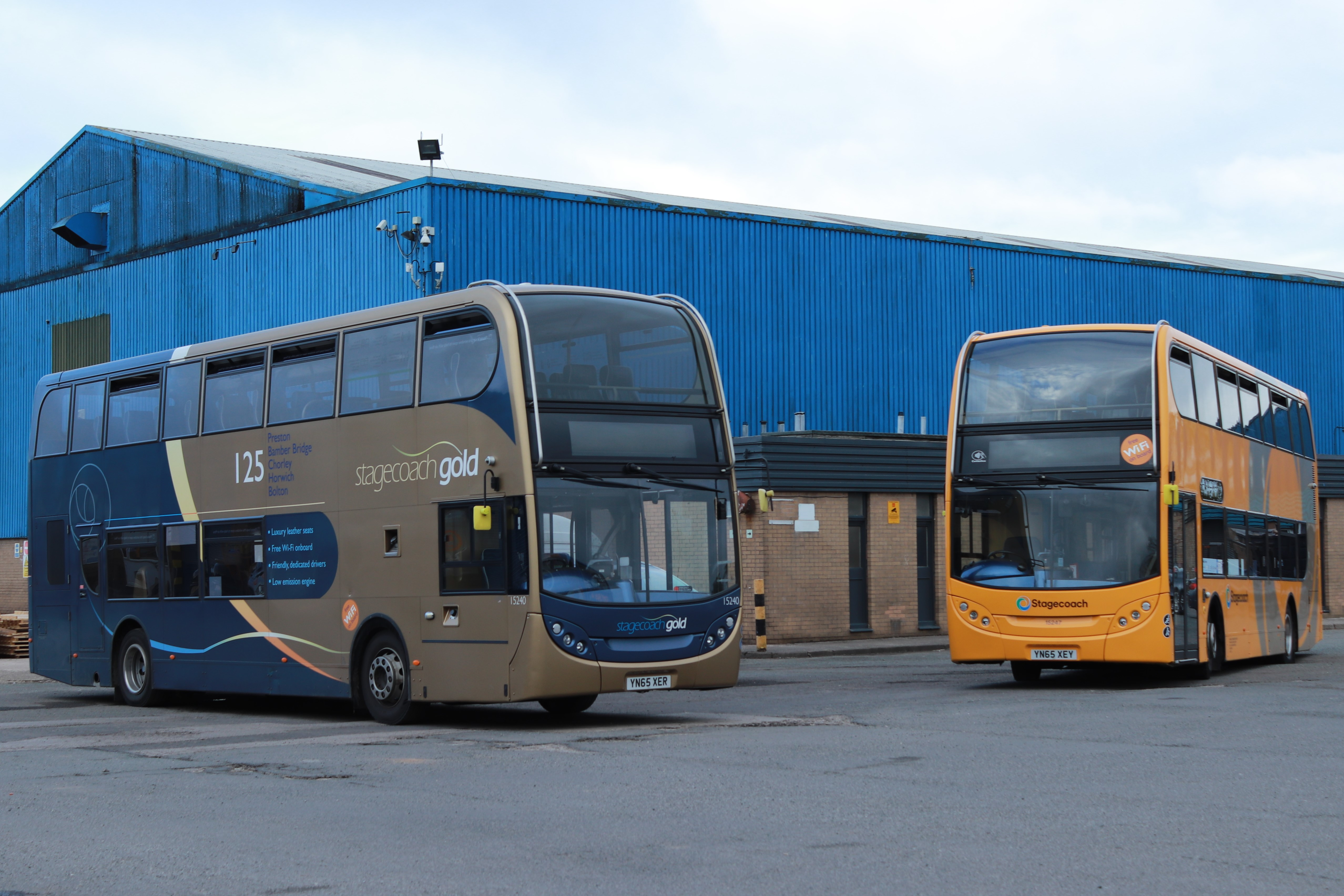

Stagecoach offered lower fares on busier routes, but unlike Preston Bus gave change. Preston Bus however had a 'Fast Fare' system where there were set fares, and no change was given, therefore making sure that all buses arrived on time, as often before the Bus Drivers had problems with issuing change, and that delayed buses. But Stagecoach Preston Citi's strongest service was the Citi 3 to Penwortham. So Preston Bus offered change on this service only.

In June 2008, both companies were agreed to a code of Practice by the Traffic Commissioner. However, competition continued.

In December 2008, it had been announced that Stagecoach had approached Preston Bus with a possible sale. The sale was signed on 23 January 2009, for a sale of £10.4 million but the only change was that tickets were accepted on both buses.

In March, they merged to form Stagecoach in Preston, with an extensive network of services in the Preston sub-area. Since then, there have been more additions to the fleet, and some of the smaller and older buses have been sold.

In May 2009, The Office of Fair Trading announced that it was referring the merger to the Competition Commission.

In September 2009, the Competition Commission announced that a good way to keep competition in Preston for the interest of Passengers was to give a grant to another operator (e.g. First, Arriva, Transdev), to start operations in Preston.

On 11 November 2009, the Competition Commission announced that they would be requesting Stagecoach in Preston to sell some of its routes, a minimal amount of its fleet and one of its two depots. There have been complaints about this.

Stagecoach in Lancashire operate some services from Chorley & Bolton and used to operate 'The Fylde Villager', services from Fleetwood to Preston Bus Station and Kirkham. But these were passed to Cumfybus and Coastal Coaches and then Blackpool Transport and now Archway Travel who now operate these services subsidised by Lancashire County Council. Notable services now operated by Stagecoach include the X2 to Liverpool, 125 to Bolton and the 280 to Clitheroe and Skipton.

Stagecoach in Lancaster operates the 40/41 service from Morecambe to Preston via Lancaster & Garstang.

==== Preston Bus ====
Preston Bus is a major operator of bus routes in the city. Established in 1904, it was subsequently run by the local council until a buyout in 1993. It was part of Stagecoach from 2009 until 2011, when it was sold to Rotala.

==== Blackburn Bus Company ====
Blackburn Bus Company operates the Hotline service 152 to Preston from Burnley and Blackburn.

==== Vision Bus ====
Vision bus operate the routes 45, 46, 113, 115 and 124.

==== Archway Travel ====
Archway travel operate the 74/75 to Fleetwood.

==== National services ====
Preston Bus Station is a stop for longer distance services operated by National Express and Flixbus.

==== Park & Ride ====
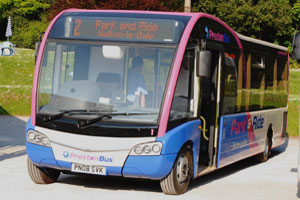
A Preston Park & Ride bus

Preston has 2 park and rides.

One is Portway park and ride served by Preston bus Route 19/20.

The other one is located at Walton-le-Dale and is operated by Stagecoach Cumbria and North Lancashire and takes 10 minutes to get to the bus station. Route 1 serves the park and ride.

=== Preston Bus Station ===
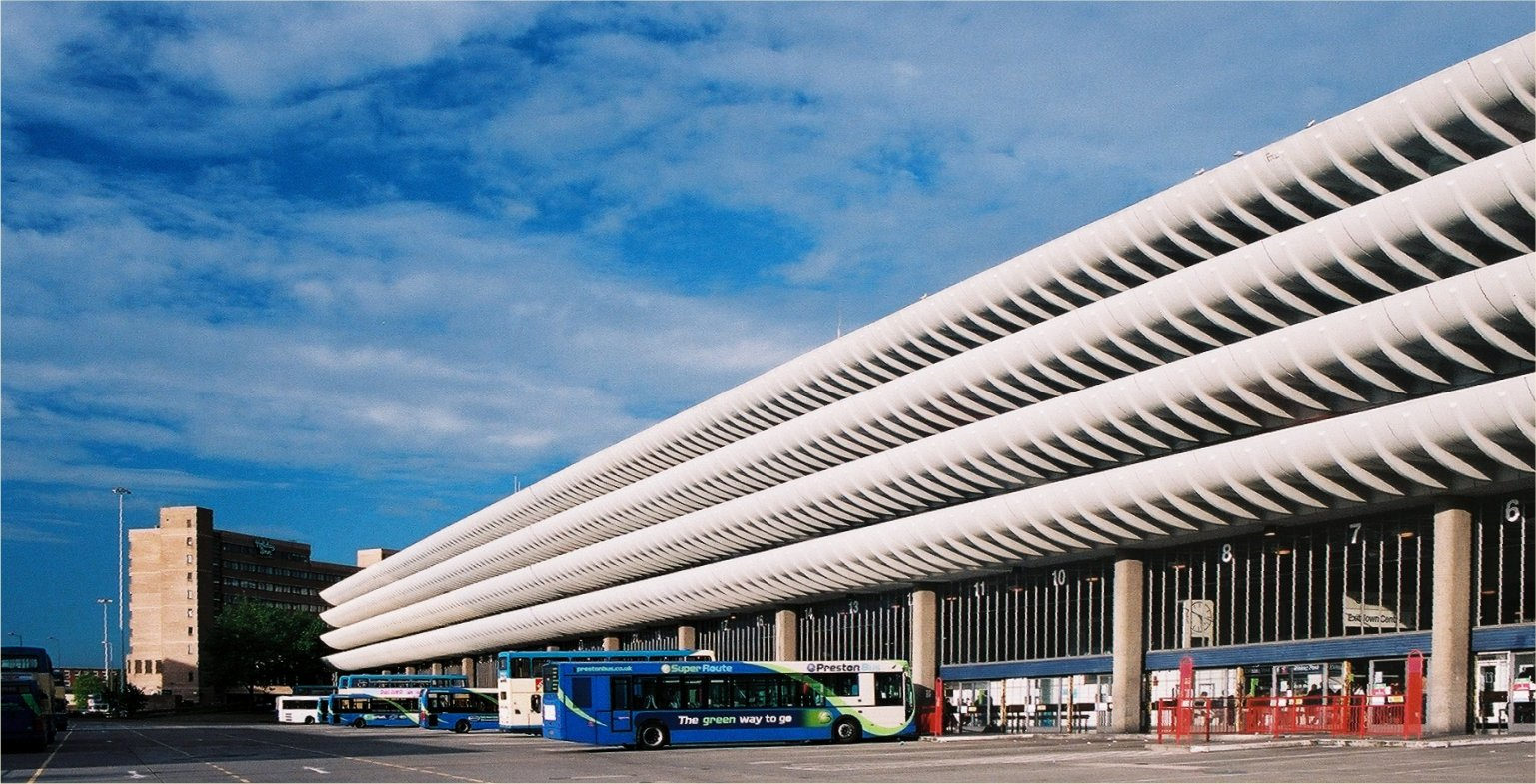
Preston bus station

Preston bus Station claims to be one of the biggest in Europe – with 38 stands. In recent years it has been threatened with demolition due to the cost of maintenance.

=== Realtime ===
Preston was one of the first cities to be fitted with Realtime, a satellite based technology where instead of just having the bus timetable at the bus stop, it provides an accurate time of when the bus will arrive, even when the bus is late, using GPS tracking. Originally the only operator that could use this was Preston Bus, but now it is used by Stagecoach in Preston, Stagecoach in Lancashire, Cumfybus, Coastal Coaches and John Fishwick & Son's service 111. In January 2009, Stagecoach in Lancaster put the GPS for real-time on some of their buses (mainly Tridents). If however one of the buses without the GPS is needed for use then they keep some at Lancaster Bus Station for the Bus Station Inspector to attach before the passengers get on the bus. They also keep some at the Catterall depot.

Realtime has been fitted on many bus stops, most of the busy ones, and is continuing to be fitted.

As a result of funding cutbacks, commencing in 2011 Lancashire County Council began switching off Realtime displays at bus stops leaving passengers to track times via the internet only. But even this functionality was ultimately disabled leaving Preston with no Realtime functionality at all

== Taxi ==
Preston is a city with many taxi companies, often based in Fulwood, Deepdale, Ribbleton and some in Penwortham. Preston has many cheap taxis, luxury taxis as well as the London Black Cabs.

== Water ==
The River Ribble runs through Preston from North Yorkshire and the estuary enters into the Irish Sea near Lytham, and used to transport ships from the cotton mills. The Lancaster Canal also starts in Preston. Other near rivers are the River Wyre and the River Darwen.

The Riversway area (also known as the Docks) used to have the Preston Port, and still has small boats. It has been the site of an expanding commercial and resident complex since 1988.

The Marina is just north of the River Ribble, and has its own chandlery, coffee shops, training courses and boat sales.

There are multi-million plans to redevelop the Docks (and the area just south of the city centre) to introduce new leisure facilities, landmark buildings, a new Central Park near Avenham, office and retail space, new residential space and the re-opening of some of the older canals. However, these plans (collectively known as the Riverworks), unlike the Tithebarn project, has yet to undergo public consultation, and has already raised flooding and loss of green space concerns.

== Air ==
There are no public airports in Preston, but Warton Aerodrome on the western outskirts of the city is an active airfield and serves the BAE Warton Factory. On the eastern outskirts was the former Samlesbury Aerodrome, but now still serves as a facility for BAE Systems.

There are three nearby airports:

- Blackpool International Airport is located only 30 kilometres (19 mi) west of the city. Most flights are charter flights, but there are some scheduled flights to Europe, Belfast and Dublin.
- Liverpool John Lennon Airport is located around 65 kilometres (40 mi) south west of the city. Unlike Blackpool, it has many scheduled flights, and some charter flights. The main airline is Ryanair.
- Manchester Airport is a major international airport around 63 kilometres (39 mi) south east of the city. It has three terminals and two runways, and has direct flights to Europe, Asia, N America and Africa.
