= Fishergate Shopping Centre =

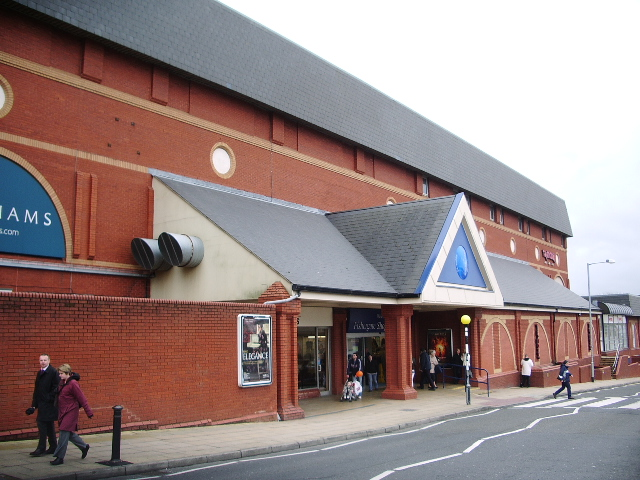
- Location: Preston, Lancashire, England
- Coordinates: 53.7567°N 2.7055°W
- Opened: 1980s
- Manager: Keith Mitchell
- Owner: Benson Elliot
- Floors: 3
- Website: shopfishergate.co.uk

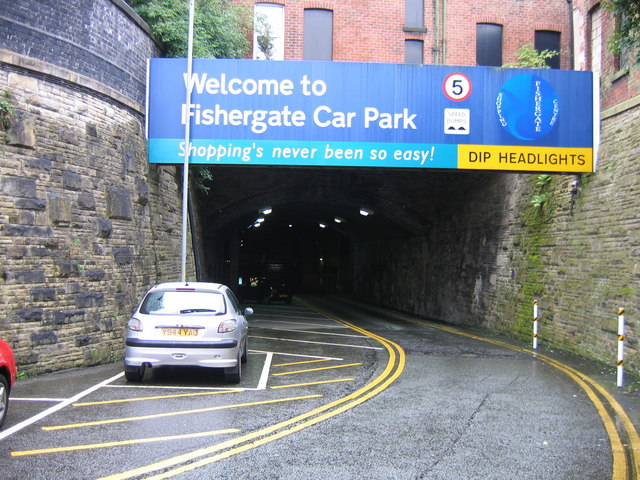
The tunnel to access the Fishergate Shopping Centre's car park is a realignment of the tunnel once used by the Lancaster Canal Tramroad

Fishergate Shopping Centre is a shopping centre in the city of Preston in Lancashire, England.

It opened in the 1980s as part of a development to revive the western end of Preston's main street, Fishergate. Its northern side is on Fishergate, and its southern side is built on the site of Butler Street Goods Yard, adjacent to the railway station. The car park, along with the station car park, occupies the remainder of the former goods yard and the site of the East Lancashire platforms of the station, which were demolished in the early 1970s.

It is the second largest shopping centre in Preston city centre, after St George's Shopping Centre (formerly The Mall). It was sold to Benson Elliot in August 2013, after former owner Agora Shopping Centres Fund was placed into administration.

It is more recently known for its free events and monthly giveaways on social media and has been increasingly popular in 2024 due to its shops holding a lower average price point compared to its competitors.

== Transport links ==
Preston railway station is immediately next to the centre, as well as Preston Bus, and Stagecoach bus services along Fishergate. Preston Park & Ride also serves the centre.

Fishergate Shopping Centre Car Park is one of Preston Town Centre's cheapest car parks and is located next to Preston Train Station. It ranges from £1.50 for one hour up to £8.50 for over 8 hours.

== Stores ==
Stores in the Fishergate Centre include McDonald's, TJ Hughes, Card Factory, Lush, Primark, TK Maxx, Starbucks, H.Samuel, Poundland, Shoe Zone, Shelter and Sports Direct.
