= Fishergate (disambiguation) =

Fishergate is an area in the centre of York, England.

Fishergate may also refer to:

- Fishergate Shopping Centre in Preston, Lancashire, England
- Preston Fishergate Hill railway station, formerly in Preston, Lancashire, England
- an earlier name of Joskeleigh, Queensland, Australia

== See also ==
- Fishersgate railway station in Sussex, England
