= St George's Shopping Centre =

St George's Shopping Centre may refer to:

- St George's Shopping Centre (Gravesend), shopping complex in the town of Gravesend, Kent, England
- St George's Shopping Centre, Harrow, shopping centre in Harrow, Greater London, owned by RDI REIT
- St George's Shopping Centre (Preston), shopping centre in the city of Preston, Lancashire, England
