= Preston Tithebarn redevelopment =

2005–2011 redevelopment project in Preston, Lancashire, England

Coordinates: 53.76°N 2.69°W

The Preston Tithebarn redevelopment project was a £700 million city centre regeneration initiative in Preston, Lancashire.

The project was intended to be developed by Preston Tithebarn Partnership, a 50/50 joint venture between Grosvenor and Lendlease in partnership with Preston City Council. In October 2005, Preston City Council and Grosvenor signed an agreement to go ahead with the Tithebarn regeneration project as part of Council's broader plans for Preston city. Tithebarn was objected to by neighbouring councils and the scheme was abandoned in 2011.

== History ==
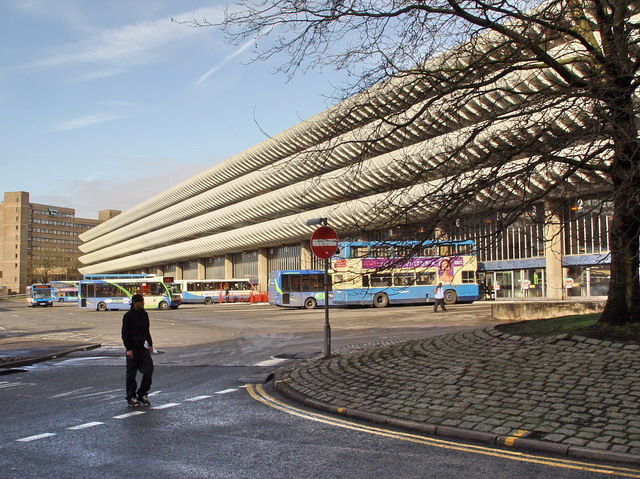
Preston bus station

In 2000, opposition to the demolition of the existing Preston bus station led to an application to English Heritage for listed building status (as an example of 1960s brutalist architecture). Preston Borough Council among others opposed the application which ultimately was unsuccessful. Putting forward the case for a smaller terminus, a report, commissioned by the council and Grosvenor, stated that "buses arriving and leaving the bus station have very low bus occupancy rates indicating that passengers alight and board elsewhere in the city centre. The bus station car park similarly suffers from the poor pedestrian linkages."

== The project ==
The Preston Tithebarn project was to cover an area of approximately 32 acres (13 ha) in Preston city centre and include a John Lewis department store, a new Marks & Spencer department store, revitalised markets, restaurants, cafes, new cinemas, around 100 new shops, offices, homes, refurbished Guild Hall, a new bus station and extensive new public spaces and pedestrianised streets.

== Development events ==
In January 2007, John Lewis confirmed it would anchor the development with a 230,000 sq ft (21,000 m^{2}) department store. In 2008 they released designs for the flagship store on their website.

Pre-planning public consultation for the Preston Tithebarn project was conducted by Preston Tithebarn Partnership between May 2008 and June 2008, and thereafter by appointment. The Preston Tithebarn Information Centre at 50-52 Lancaster Road, Preston (next to the Guild Hall) was created for the public consultation where visitors were able to view plans, information and a 3D model.

Preston Tithebarn Partnership submitted a hybrid planning application to Preston City Council in September 2008. All development within the application boundary was submitted with some matters reserved, except for the 1875 Covered Market and Fish Market for which full details were submitted.

In October 2008, Marks & Spencer confirmed it would join Preston Tithebarn as the second anchor, with plans to build a 150,000 sq ft (14,000 m^{2}) store.

In December 2008, Cineworld also confirmed it would join Preston Tithebarn, with plans to build a new multi-screen cinema.

On 14 July 2009, following 2 days of presentations, questioning and debate, Preston City Council Planning Committee approved the application. The matter proceeded to Government Office North West.

In November 2011 the scheme was abandoned after department store John Lewis pulled out.

== Listed building status ==
In January 2010 an application by The Twentieth Century Society to have the bus station registered as listed building was rejected by the Secretary of State which paved the way for the public enquiry into the Tithebarn development to proceed.

In May and June 2010 a Public enquiry was held into the Preston Tithebarn Project.
