= St George's Shopping Centre (Preston) =

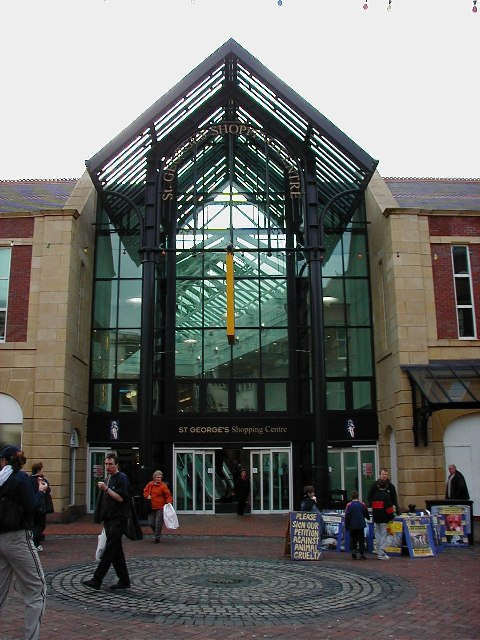
- The Friargate entrance in 2002
- Location: Preston, Lancashire, England
- Coordinates: 53.7589°N 2.7016°W
- Opened: November 1964; 62 years ago
- Manager: Adhan Group
- Num. of stores: 106
- Floor area: 270,000 sq ft (25,000 m^{2})
- Floors: 2
- Parking: 410 spaces
- Website: www.stgeorgespreston.co.uk

St George's Shopping Centre, formerly The Mall Preston and The Mall St George, is a shopping centre in the city of Preston, Lancashire, England.

== History ==
The shopping centre opened in November 1964, as St George's Shopping Centre. It was originally an open air centre, and was roofed over during refurbishment in 1981. It was further refurbished in 1999. In May 2004, when The Mall Fund took over the centre, they were greeted with an ageing shopping centre.

The shopping centre was rebranded as The Mall, and a massive development scheme was planned. Small stalls, main shops, cafes, restaurants, toilets, and escalators were overhauled.

The introduction of television screens in the shopping centre has given information and news to the shoppers in the centre. The Mall Company also put 'Ask Me' points in the centre, so that shoppers could ask members of staff directions and other information. In March 2010, the shopping centre was acquired by Aviva Investors for £87 million. and subsequently, in September 2010, The Mall was rebranded under its original name St George's Shopping Centre.

The centre was again sold in 2015. This time for £73 million to IRAF UK Dragon.

In 2016, the Fishergate entrance to the shopping centre was refurbished, as well as the corridors leading from the Fishergate and Lune Street entrances to the central rotunda.

In 2019, the Lune Street entrance and corridor were closed due to most of the shop units being vacant. Despite the corridor only being refurbished 3 years earlier, it was removed and a Matalan store now takes its place.

IRAF UK Dragon went into administration in 2021 and the centre was sold to the Adhan Group.

== Centre information ==
The centre is arranged around a large circular glass roofed rotunda in the centre, which was originally known as "The Bullring", when it was open air, and where there is now a Costa Coffee,

Radiating from the rotunda are large halls and promenades, lined with shops and stalls. Glass roofs and walls are also evident in the centre. A two-floor hall leads to Friargate, with another hall leading to Fishergate on the upper floor. A third route on the lower floor to Lune Street was closed in 2019. The rotunda also has a third floor with offices and access to the centre's car park.

== Transport links ==
St George's is located between the city's two main shopping streets of Fishergate and Friargate, and runs its own multi-storey car park above the centre, which vehicles access from Lune Street. There is a Preston Park & Ride bus stop outside the centre's Lune Street entrance, and Fishergate is served by several bus routes. The centre is within half a mile of Preston railway station and Preston bus station.
