= Preston park and ride =

Bus service in Lancashire, England

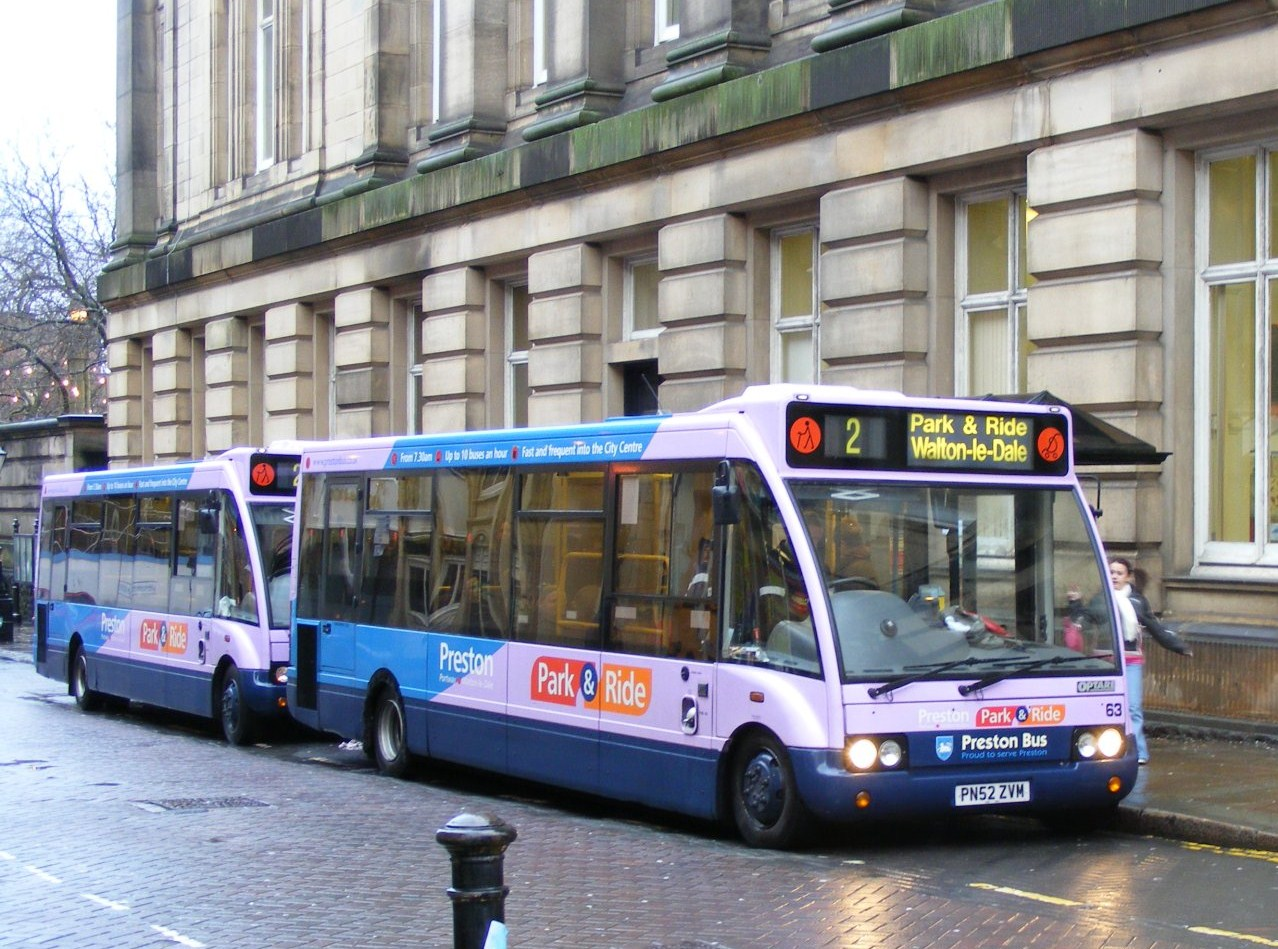
- Optare Solo bus in the previous Preston Bus park and ride livery in December 2007
- Founded: November 1988; 37 years ago
- Service area: Preston
- Service type: Bus services
- Destinations: Preston & Walton-le-Dale
- Fleet: Optare Solo SR
- Operator: Preston Bus & Stagecoach Merseyside & South Lancashire
- Website: Information for both routes at Lancashire County Council

Preston park and ride is a park-and-ride scheme in the city of Preston in Lancashire, England, operated by both Rotala subsidiary Preston Bus and Stagecoach Merseyside & South Lancashire.

== Services ==
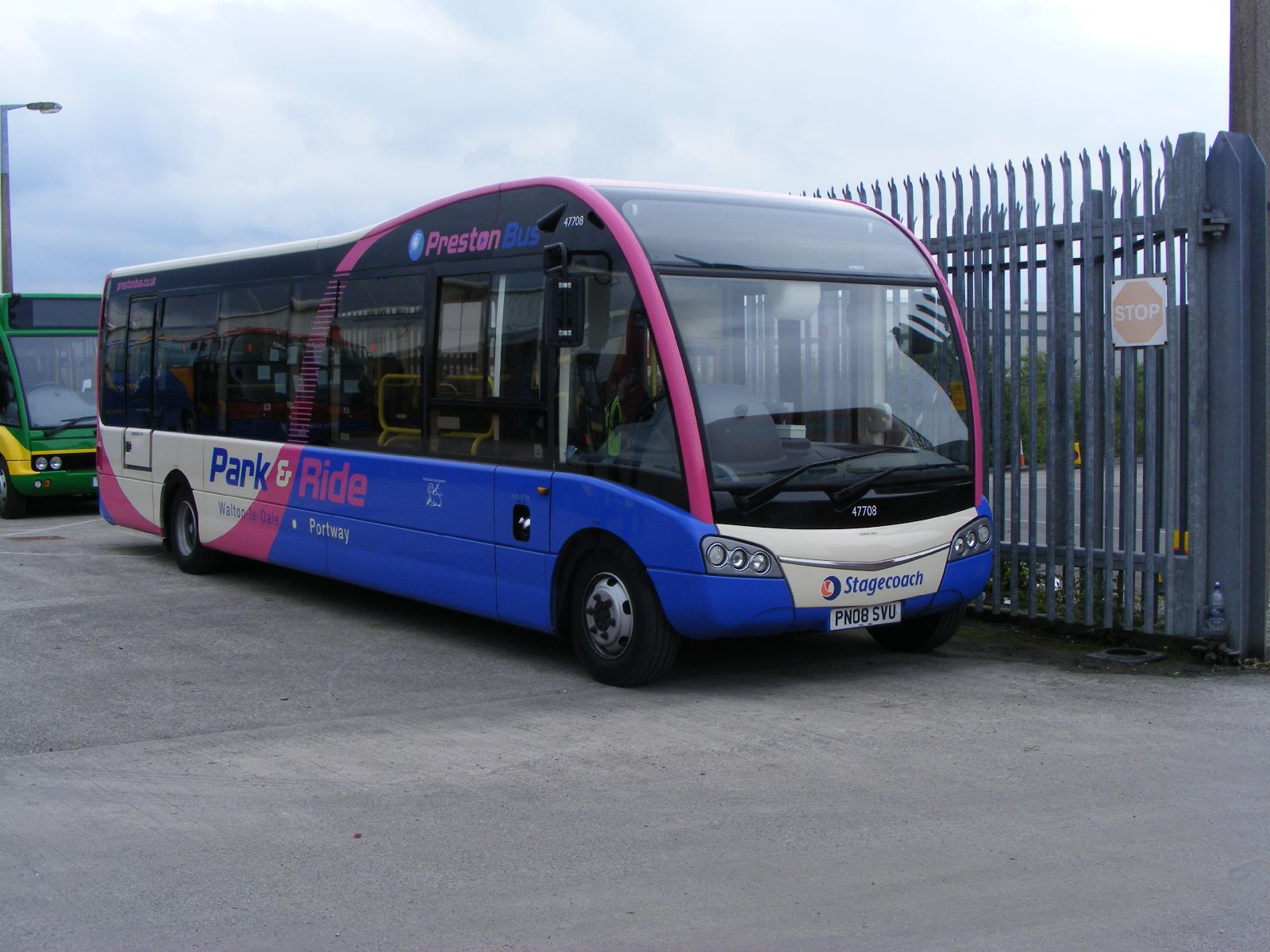
Stagecoach in Preston Optare Solo SR in May 2009

The park and ride system consists of two car parks at Portway (off the A59 road) and one at Walton-le-Dale, connected by bus routes to the city centre; the Portway route also serves Preston railway station. The services do not run on Sundays, and a reduced service operates on bank holidays. The car parks are free, with users paying for the bus journey.

Before 4 March 2013, the Portway and Walton-le-Dale sites were served by separate routes:

- Route 1 – Portway – Fishergate Shopping Centre – St George's Shopping Centre and return
- Route 2 – Walton-le-Dale – London Road/Queen Street – Jacson Street and return

The park and ride service was introduced in November 1988, operated by Ribble Motor Services, and after acquisition by the Stagecoach Group in May 1989, its successor Stagecoach Ribble. In September 1991, Preston Bus took over operation of the service. It originally consisted of one site, at Portway in the Riversway Docklands area. The second, at Capitol Way in Walton-le-Dale, was opened on 1 December 2002.

In June 2009, a third site was opened at Bluebell Way in Fulwood. Served by the "Orbit" routes 88A and 88C rather than having its own dedicated service, it was unpopular due to higher fares and infrequent bus service and was closed in January 2011. In February 2013, it was announced that the two park and ride routes would be combined from 4 March, to create a route (Route 1) through the city centre.

The through route was affected by congestion along Fishergate, when the street was being made into a shared space, and in May 2016, the routes were separated again to improve reliability. Most journeys from the site on Portway (which became Route 2) were replaced by a diversion of Route 89.

In July 2019, Stagecoach Merseyside & South Lancashire were awarded the service PR1, Jacson Street to Walton-le-Dale Park & Ride and return. This route is currently active with Stagecoach, retaining the Lancashire County Council route branding and has formally replaced the PrestonBus operation of this route.

In July 2021, PrestonBus merged their service 89 (serving Portway park & ride) and service 16 to Farringdon Park to create a CrossCity service 100. This service was given the number 100 to celebrate 100 years of buses in Preston. The year after they had 2 buses commissioned in 2 separate heritage liveries to also celebrate this.

== Fleet ==
As of July 2019, The Walton-le-Dale Park and ride service (PR1) operated by Stagecoach M&SL is run using Optare Solo SR buses, retaining the Lancashire County Council Park and Ride route branding. The Portway park and ride service (part of 100 CrossCity) operated by Rotala is run using their standard fleet allocation with PrestonBus livery.

In 2011, hybrid Optare Versa buses were introduced on the Walton-le-Dale service, but these were transferred to other services, when the park and ride was run as a through route. Preston Bus was the first operator of Optare Solo SR buses, as eight were acquired for the Park & Ride routes, five of which entered service in May 2008. They have leather seats.

These were replaced by Optare Versa buses on the Walton-le-Dale route but continued to be used on the Portway service, and on both routes since withdrawal of the separate service Portway, due to the layout of the site on Portway. Previously, Ribble used Iveco minibuses; vehicles used by Preston Bus have included Dodge minibuses, and Optare's MetroRider, Solo and Versa.
