= Preston Bus =

Bus operator in Preston, Lancashire, England

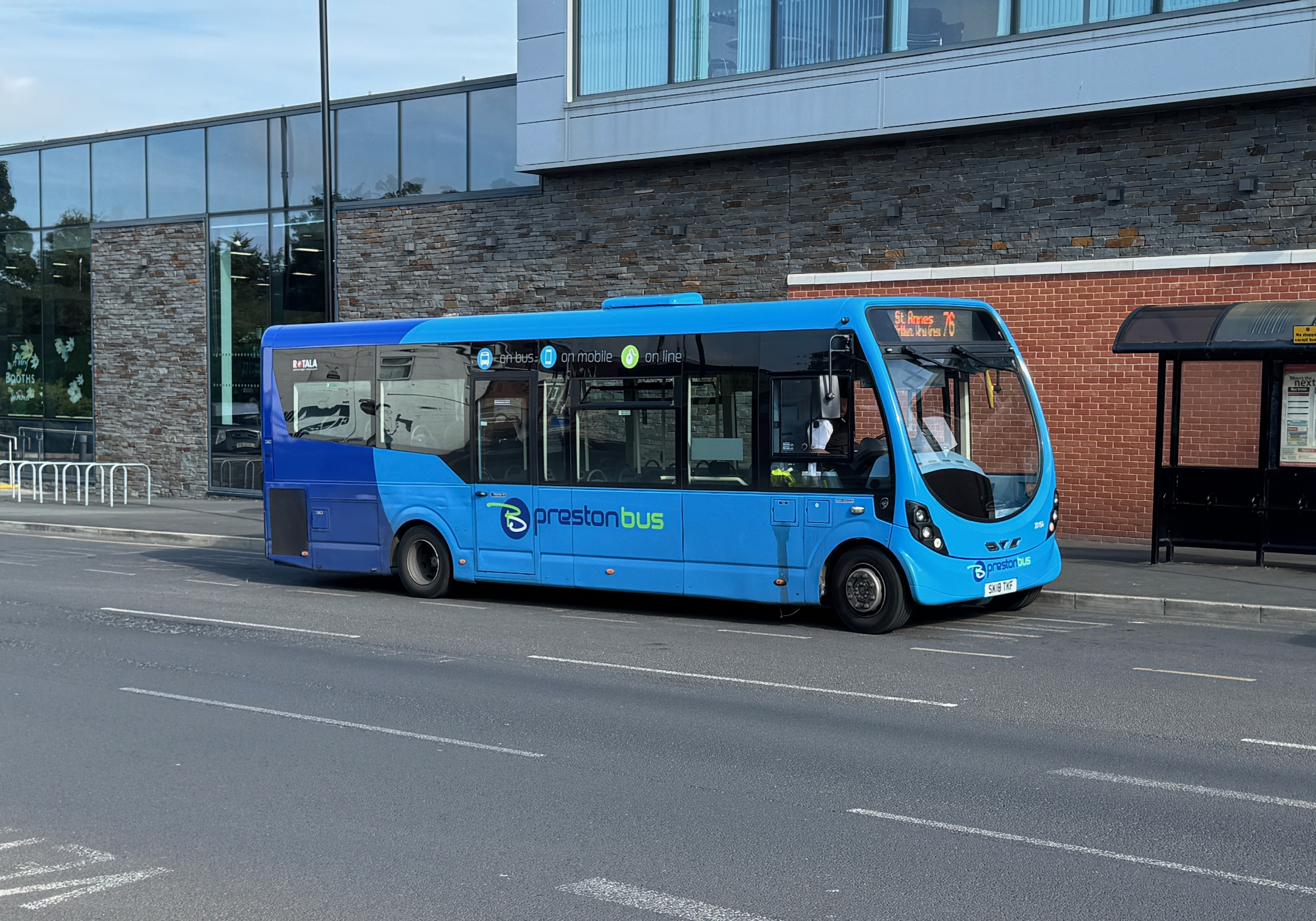
- Wright StreetLite WF in Poulton-le-Fylde in July 2024
- Parent: Rotala
- Founded: June 1904; 122 years ago
- Headquarters: Preston, Lancashire, England
- Service area: Preston; Parts of Lancashire
- Service type: Bus services
- Fleet: 90 (November 2024)
- Managing Director: Matt Rawlinson
- Website: Official website

Preston Bus is a bus operator running services in the city of Preston and surrounding areas of Lancashire. It is a subsidiary of Rotala, who purchased Preston Bus from the Stagecoach Group on the orders of the Competition Commission in 2011.

== History ==
=== Council ownership ===
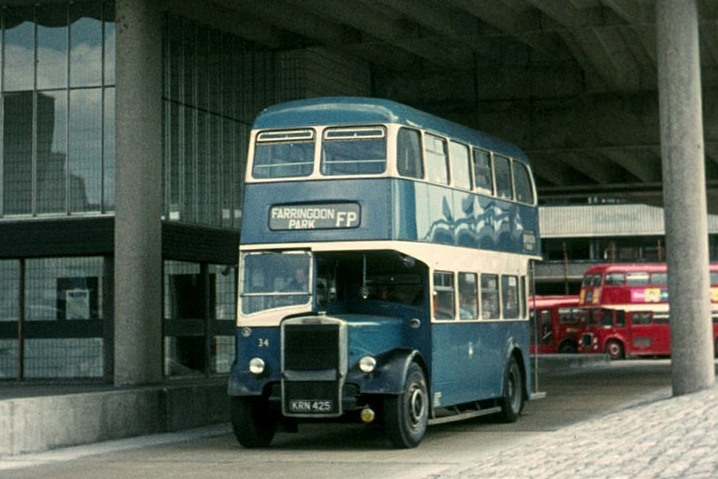
Preston Corporation Crossley bodied Leyland Titan at Preston bus station in May 1971

Preston Corporation began operating electric tram services in the Borough in 1904, although horse-drawn trams had been running since 1879. On 23 January 1922, Preston Corporation began its first bus service, running along Plungington Road using a fleet of Leyland buses. Expansions of these bus services soon followed and eventually replaced Preston's trams, the last of which ran in December 1935.

On 12 October 1969, the £1.1 million (equivalent to £15,983,000 in 2025) Preston bus station was opened on Tithebarn Street, the site of a Ribble Motor Services station, after two years of construction. With the station being owned by the Borough Council, bus routes ran by Preston Corporation were rerouted from terminating at points around the city centre to centrally serve the station's 80 departure gates.

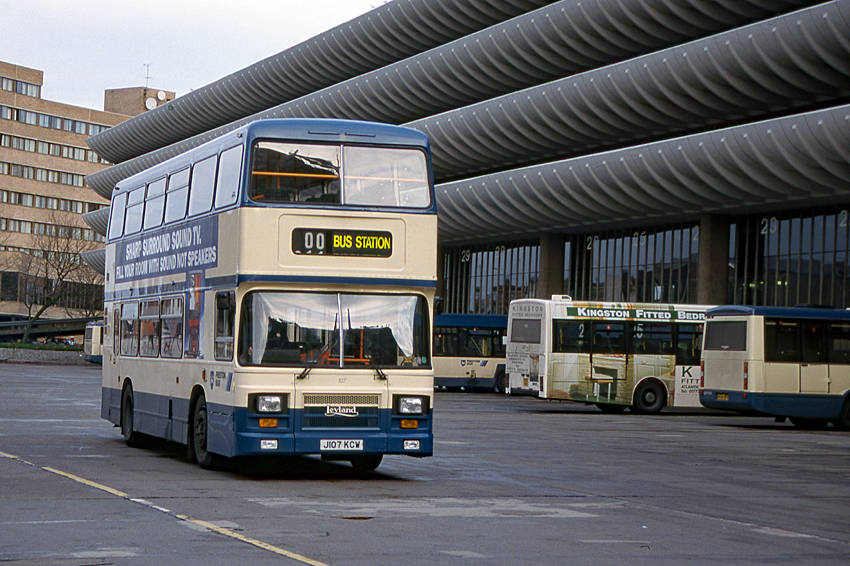
Preston Bus Leyland Olympian at Preston Bus Station in November 1997

Preston Borough Council continued to run the bus services until 1986 when, in order to comply with the Transport Act 1985 and ensuing deregulation of bus services from 26 October 1986, the assets of Preston Transport were transferred to a new "arm's length" legal entity, Preston Borough Transport Limited, trading as Preston Bus. The Borough Council resisted offers and central government pressure to sell Preston Bus until 1989, when talks began with the operator's management and staff towards selling Preston Bus in a management buyout. The management buyout of Preston Bus from the Borough Council was eventually concluded with the sale of Preston Bus for £3 million (equivalent to £6,456,000 in 2025) in April 1993.

In late 1999, Preston Bus launched the 'Quality Bus' scheme in partnership with both the Borough Council and Lancashire County Council, which saw improvements to routes 33 and 35, running from Preston bus station to Tanterton, including road realignments, the moving of bus stops, and the issuing of Traffic Regulation Orders enforced by the Lancashire Constabulary, with the aim of reducing delays on the services. Preston Bus launched a fleet of seven East Lancs Lolyne bodied Dennis Trident 2 low-floor buses for use on the revised 33 and 35.

=== Preston bus war ===
In 2006, Stagecoach North West introduced various services with a fleet of Optare Solos, Alexander Dennis Enviro400s, and Dennis Dart SLFs, branded as 'Preston Citi', to compete with Preston Bus. This competition escalated into a bus war, with Stagecoach offering lower fares on the busiest routes.

The managing director of Preston Bus was concerned Stagecoach could force his company out of business. Both companies accused each other of unprofessional behaviour, with reports of Stagecoach drivers throwing eggs at Preston Bus vehicles.

On 10 June 2008, the two companies agreed to a code of practice by the North West of England Traffic Commissioner. The two companies remained in competition under the restrictions of this code of practice, with Stagecoach beginning to operating routes within Preston while Preston Bus commenced a service between Preston and Penwortham, with a limited service running between Preston and Southport, duplicating existing Stagecoach routes.

==== Stagecoach in Preston ====
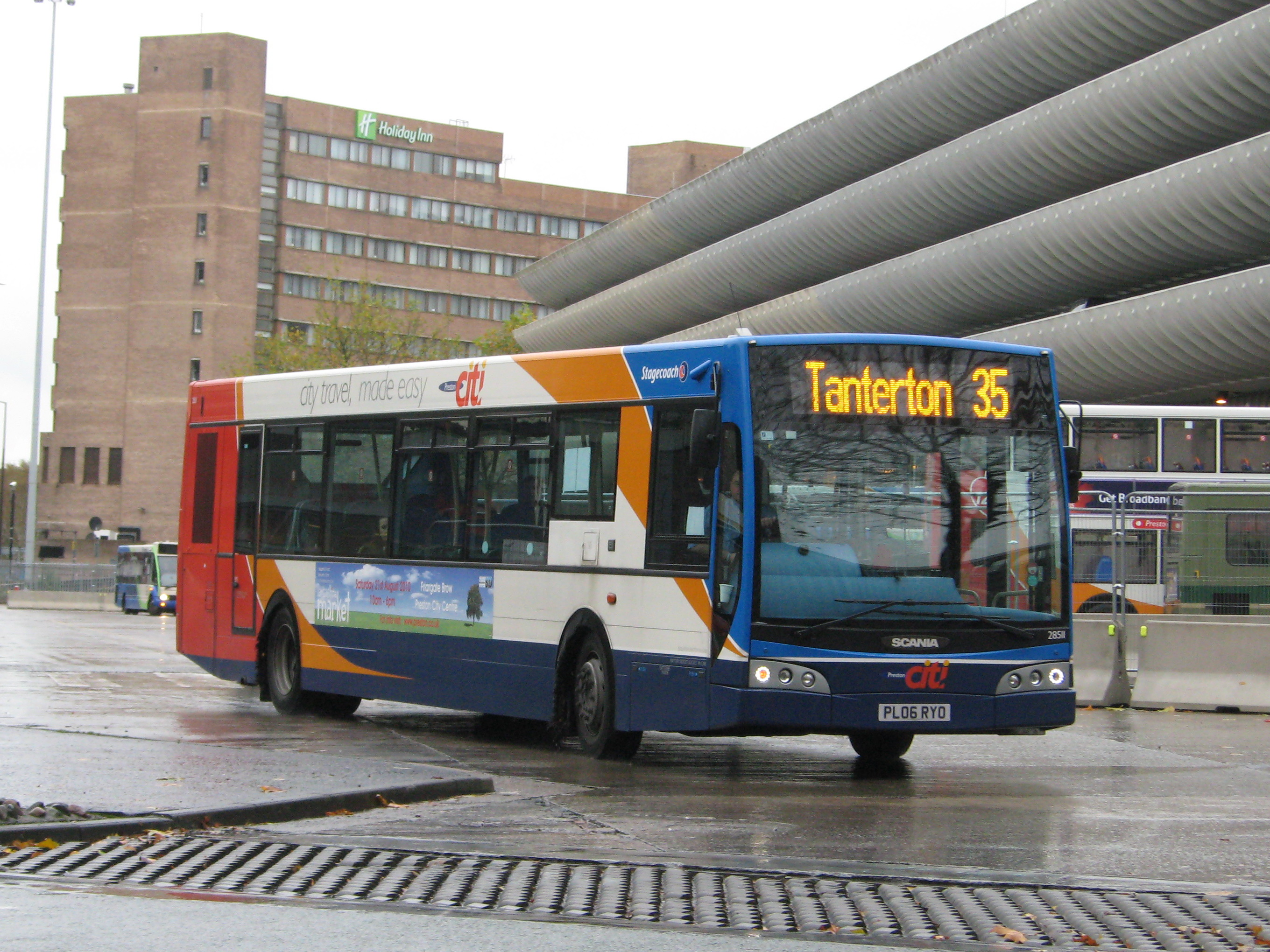
Stagecoach in Preston East Lancs Esteem bodied Scania N94UB at Preston bus station in November 2010

On 30 December 2008, Stagecoach approached Preston Bus to negotiate a potential sale. On 23 January 2009, Preston Bus was sold to Stagecoach for £6.4 million (equivalent to £10,212,000 in 2025), with the company as Stagecoach in Preston from March 2009 onwards.

On 28 May 2009, the Office of Fair Trading announced that it was referring the purchase of Preston Bus by Stagecoach to the Competition Commission. The provisional findings suggested that the acquisition reduced competition and may potentially harm the interests of passengers. Possible remedies included the sale of part or all of the business and measures to encourage new entry by other operators, as well as controls on fares and requirements to maintain service levels.

On 11 November 2009, the Competition Commission ruled that the takeover by Stagecoach had adversely affected competition in the area and ordered Stagecoach to sell Preston Bus. Stagecoach made an appeal to the Competition Appeal Tribunal following this ruling, stating that the Competition Commission's decision was "perverse and irrational" and that the commission had committed an error in law with its use of the counterfactual argument and handling of Stagecoach's responses. Despite the Competition Appeal Tribunal ruling in May 2010 that the Competition Commission had imposed a disproportionate remedy based on inconsistent evidence, agreeing with some of Stagecoach's appeals, Stagecoach began actively looking for a buyer, reinstating the Preston Bus name, livery and logo and operating the company at arm's length from the main Stagecoach business.

=== Rotala ownership ===
In January 2011, Preston Bus was sold to Rotala for £3.2 million (equivalent to £4,732,000 in 2025), beating a bid for another management buyout that had received £25,000 of funding from Preston Borough Council. Rotala reorganised Preston Bus as a subsidiary of its nationwide bus operations and remained separate following the formation of Diamond North West in Greater Manchester in March 2015, despite Diamond being based in Preston.

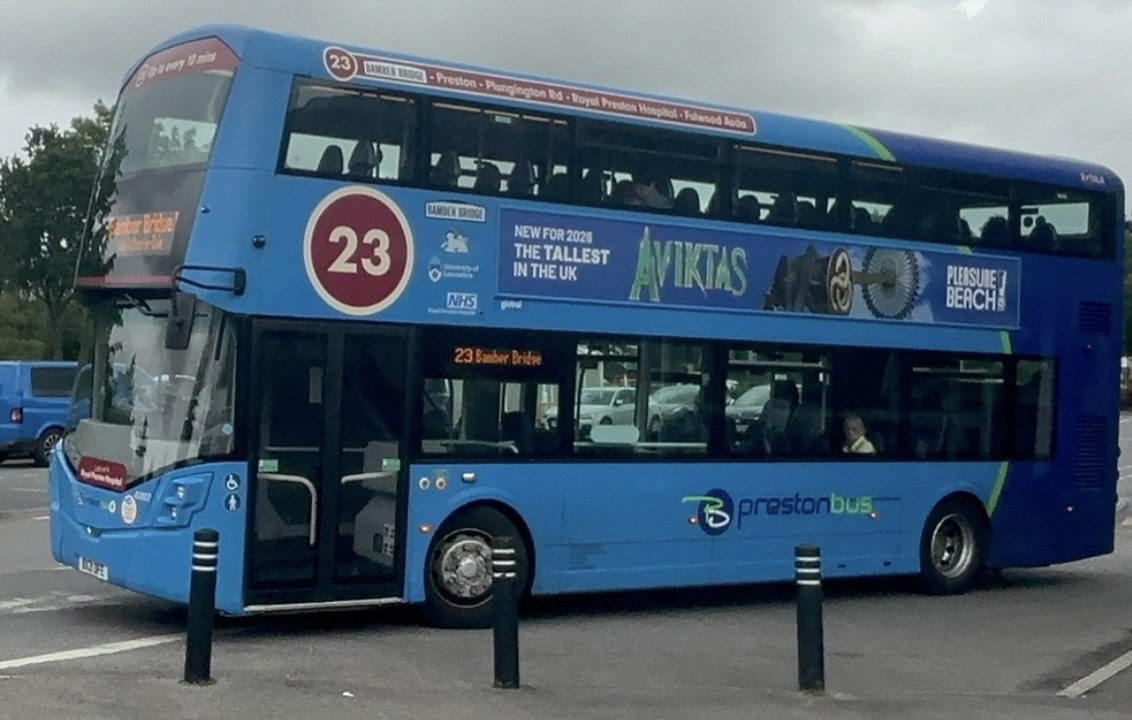
Preston Bus Wright StreetDeck Ultroliner at Fulwood during May 2026.

In June 2011, Preston Bus announced it was to surrender its commercial operation of the Preston park and ride services to Lancashire County Council, claiming that services could not continue with Preston Bus due to a lack of financial support from the council. The service resumed with Preston Bus under tender from the council, and following a series of cuts reducing it to one route, was eventually tendered to Stagecoach Merseyside and South Lancashire in July 2019.

== Fleet ==
As of November 2024, the Preston Bus fleet consisted of around 90 buses.

Until the 1970s, the fleet livery was cream and red; a blue and cream scheme was introduced from the 1970s onwards. Upon the sale of Stagecoach in Preston to Rotala in January 2011, a cream, green and blue livery was introduced, superseded in July 2020 with the introduction of a two-tone blue scheme with a green dividing line on a fleet of four new Wright StreetDecks.

During 2025, a new fleet of seven Enviro200 MMC’s were introduced.

== Routes ==
The 16 routes in operation:

| Number | Route | Via | Notes |
| 6 | Bus Station - Red Scar | Deepdale | |
| 8 | Bus Station - Moor Nook | Ribbleton Lane | |
| 16 | Bus Station - Farringdon Park | New Hall Lane | |
| 19 | Larches - Bus Station - RPH | Docks, Railway Station, Deepdale | |
| 19A | Lea - Bus Station - RPH | Docks, Railway Station, Deepdale | |
| 23 | Bamber Bridge - Fulwood Asda | Bus Station / RPH (Main Road) | Branded as 23 |
| 31 | Bus Station - Lea | Ashton | |
| 35 | Bus Station - Tanterton | Ashton | |
| 43 | Bus Station - RPH | Cottam | |
| 44 | Bus Station - Ingol - Cottam | Railway Station, Ashton | |
| 48 | Bus Station - Lea | RPH, Tanterton, Cottam | |
| 114 | Chorley - Leyland | Chorley Hospital | |
| 311 | Ormskirk - Chorley | Skelmersdale | |
| 312 | Ormskirk - Rainford | Skelmersdale | |
| 319 | Skelmersdale - Kirkby | | Branded as Trainlink |
| 347 | Chorley to Croston | Charnock Richard | Sunday Only |

== See also ==
- Public transport in the Fylde
- List of bus operators of the United Kingdom
- Transport in Preston
