= Preston bus station =

Bus station in Preston, Lancashire, England

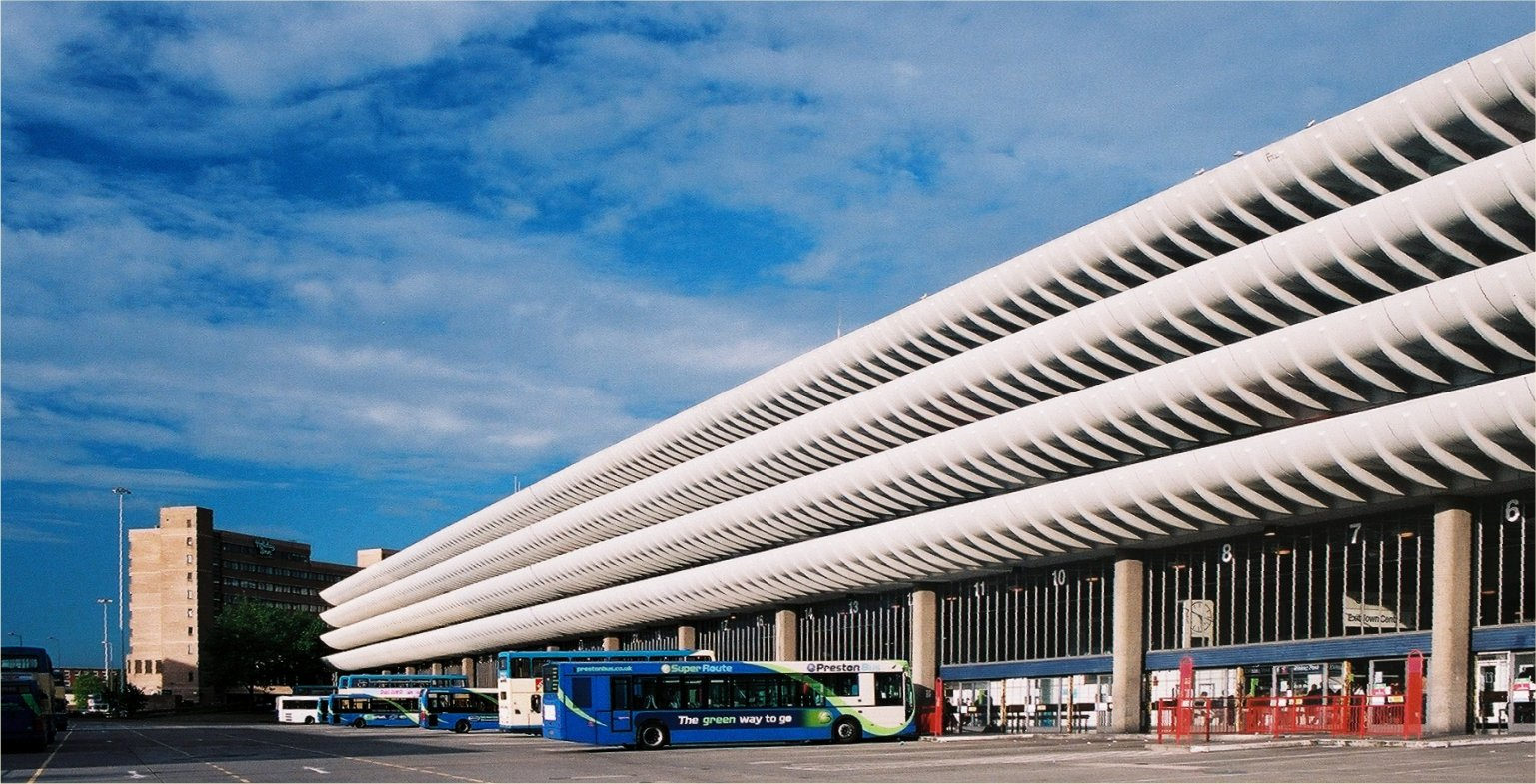
- Pictured in October 2007, before the 2016 renovation

General information
- Location: Preston, Lancashire
- Coordinates: 53.761°N 2.696°W
- Operator: Lancashire County Council
- Bus stands: 80 (1969–2017); 40 (since 2017)
- Bus operators: Archway Travel; Blackburn Bus Company; Holmeswood Coaches; National Express; Preston Bus; Stagecoach Cumbria & North Lancashire; Stagecoach Merseyside & South Lancashire; Tyrers Coaches; Vision Bus
- Connections: Preston (800 metres (870 yd))

History
- Opened: 12 October 1969

Listed Building – Grade II
- Official name: Preston Central Bus Station and Car Park
- Designated: 23 September 2013; 13 years ago
- Reference no.: 1416042
Location
- Location within Preston city centre

Preston bus station is the central bus station in the city of Preston, Lancashire, England. It was designed by Ove Arup & Partners in Brutalist architectural style between 1968 and 1969, to a design by Keith Ingham and Charles Wilson of Building Design Partnership with E. H. Stazicker. It was built by John Laing.

In the 2000s the building was threatened with demolition as part of the city council's Tithebarn redevelopment project. After two unsuccessful attempts, it was granted Grade II listed building status in September 2013. It was then refurbished and reopened in July 2018.

== Design ==
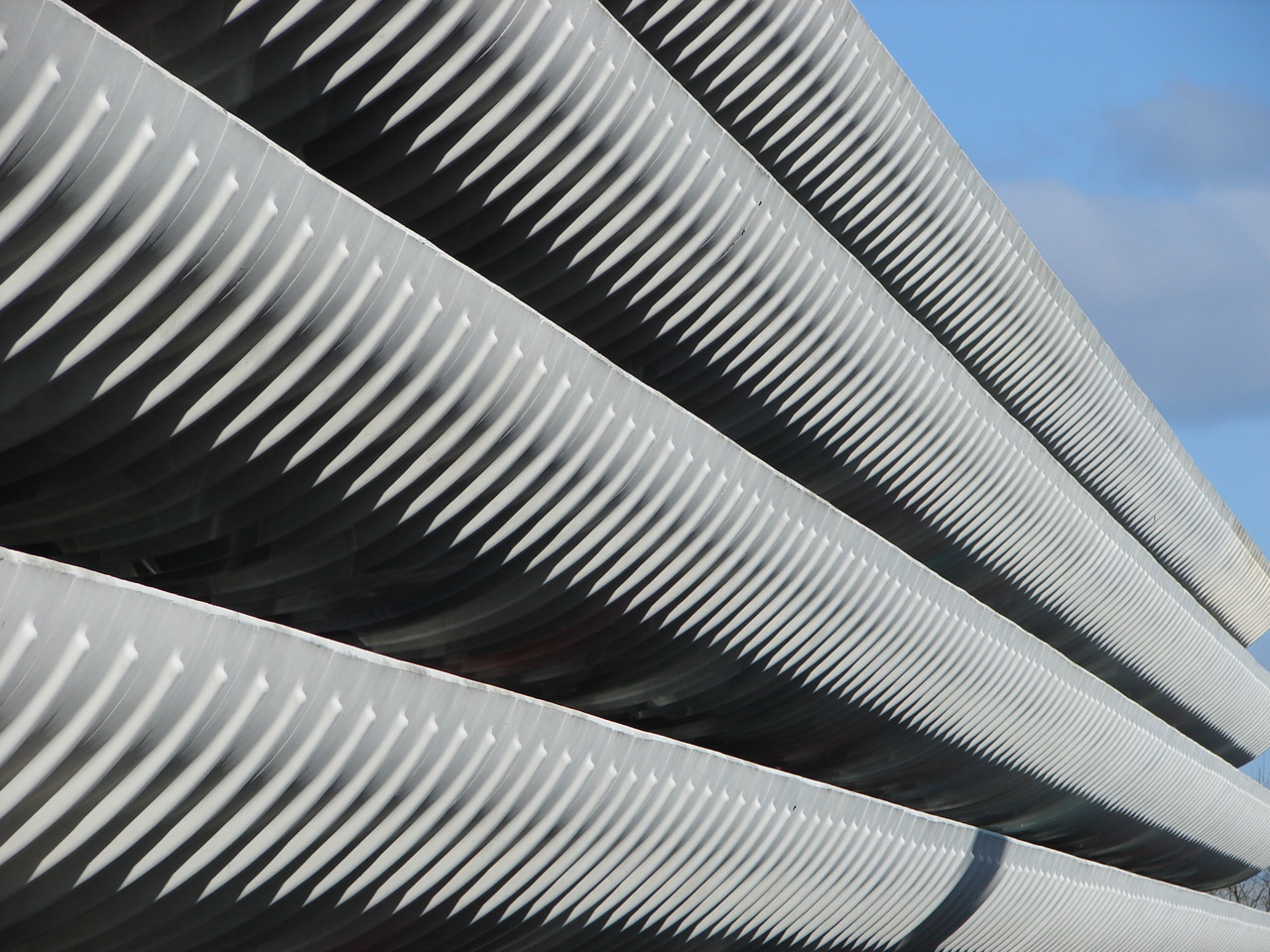
The distinctive curve of the car park balconies

Built in Brutalist architectural style between 1968 and 1969, designed by Keith Ingham and Charles Wilson of Building Design Partnership with E. H. Stazicker, it had (until 2017) a capacity of 80 double-decker buses, 40 along each side of the building. Some claimed that it was the second largest bus station in Western Europe. Pedestrian access to the bus station was originally through any of three subways, one of which linked directly to the adjacent Guild Hall, while the design also incorporates a multi-storey car park of five floors with space for 1,100 cars. It has been described by the Twentieth Century Society as "one of the most significant Brutalist buildings in the UK".

The building's engineers, Ove Arup & Partners, designed the distinctive curve of the car park balconies "after acceptable finishes to a vertical wall proved too expensive, contributing to the organic, sculptural nature of the building. The edges are functional, too, in that they protect car bumpers from crashing against a vertical wall. The cover balustrade protects passengers from the weather by allowing buses to penetrate beneath the lower parking floor." Built by John Laing, it was opened on 22 October 1969 by the chairman of British Leyland.

== Threatened demolition ==
The building was threatened with demolition as part of the City Council's Tithebarn redevelopment project. After the Tithebarn development was abandoned, there were still proposals to demolish the bus station and replace it with a small interchange near the railway station.

In 2000, opposition to demolition led to a failed application for listed building status by English Heritage. Preston Borough Council (as it was then known) opposed the application.

Putting forward the case for a smaller terminus, a report, commissioned by the council and Grosvenor in 2000, stated that "buses arriving and leaving the bus station have very low bus occupancy rates indicating that passengers alight and board elsewhere in the town centre. The bus station car park similarly suffers from the poor pedestrian linkages." Listing was subsequently rejected.

A survey conducted by the Lancashire Evening Post in May 2010 found that Preston Bus Station was the favourite building of the people of Preston.

A further application to list the bus station was rejected in 2010 and a review of the decision was turned down in 2011. It featured on the 2012 World Monument Fund's list of sites at risk.

In 2012, John Wilson of Fulwood in Preston and a member of the "Save Preston Bus Station" campaign presented a petition of 1435 signatures to Preston City Council calling for a referendum on the future of the bus station and argued that 80% of Preston people surveyed supported keeping the bus station and investing in it. Councillors voted to reject a referendum, with only one councillor, Terry Cartwright of Deepdale ward, voting in favour.

On 7 December 2012, Preston City Council announced that the bus station would be demolished. They said that it would cost £23m to refurbish it and more than £5m just to keep it standing; although they also conceded that demolition would cost an estimated £1.8m. The Twentieth Century Society, which opposed the scheme, stated that a fraction of this amount would maintain the building while proposals to retain it were being worked up.

In 2013, listed building status was applied for again by The Twentieth Century Society; and this time it was granted, at Grade II status.

== Refurbishment ==
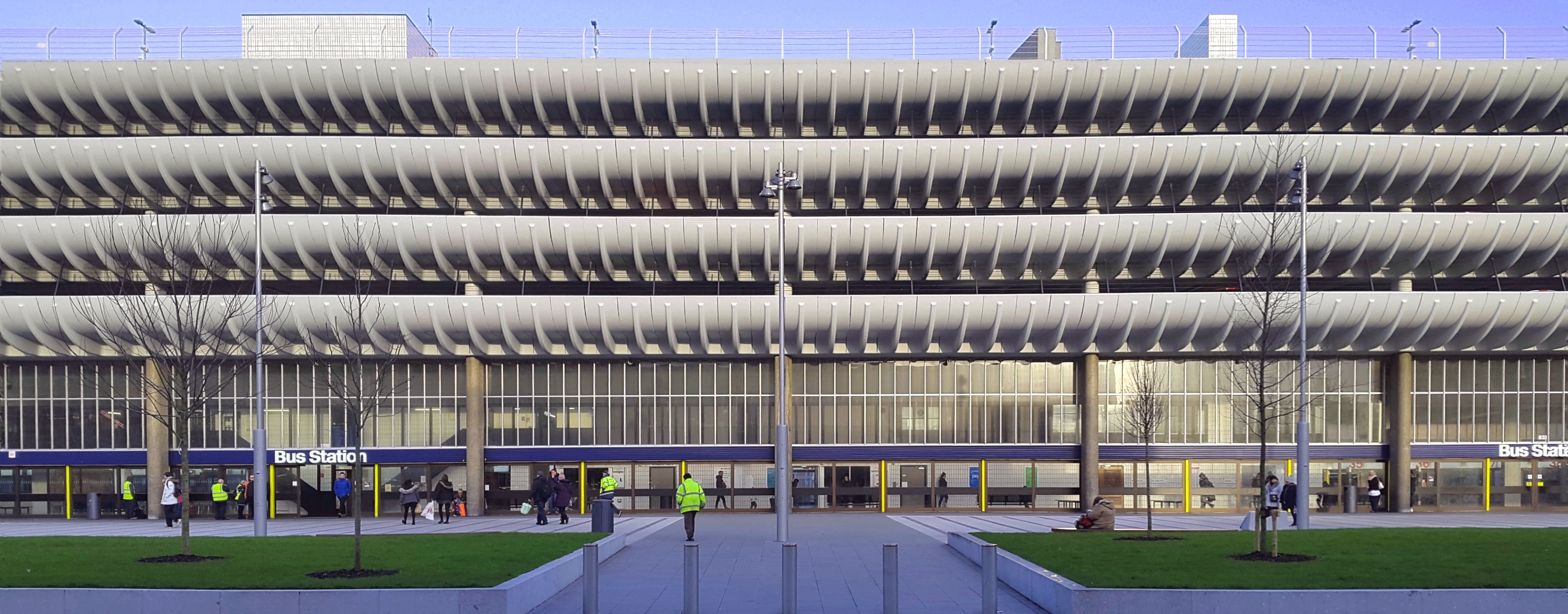
The new concourse, replacing the western bays

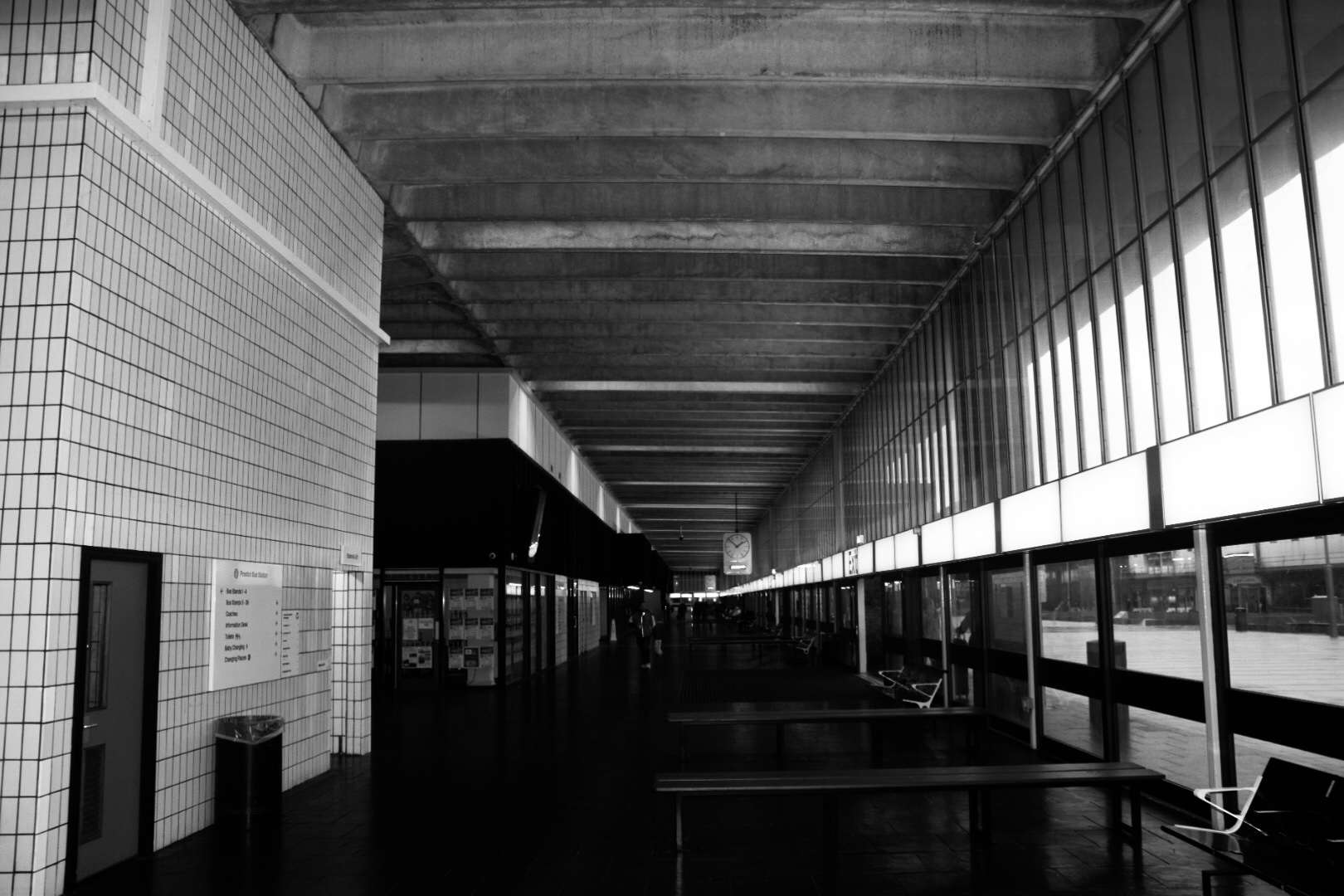
The interior in February 2020

In October 2014, Lancashire County Council announced plans for a £23 million renovation of the bus station, including "Youth zone" facilities for young people, along with a new public square on the western side of the building to improve public access to and from Fishergate, St John's Shopping Centre and the Preston Guild Hall.

The council announced an international competition for the design of the new bus station, to be run by the Royal Institute of British Architects (RIBA), and the selection criteria would include a public vote. Over 90 entries were received and short-listed to five finalists, with more than 4,200 members of the public voting for their favourite design. In August 2015, New York-based (with offices in London) architecture company John Puttick Associates' entry was chosen as the winning design. Preston-based architecture group Cassidy + Ashton, who finished a close second (just four points behind the winner), were named as a partner on the project.

While the "Youth Zone" was later cancelled, refurbishment work for the bus station commenced in 2016. In 2017 bus stands 1–40 on the western side were closed, and stands 41–80 on the eastern side were renumbered 1–40. The station was officially re-opened in July 2018, although the works continued. In March 2019, the second and final stage of the project saw the construction of a public square in place of the western bus stands commence, with work completed late that year.

== 50th anniversary ==
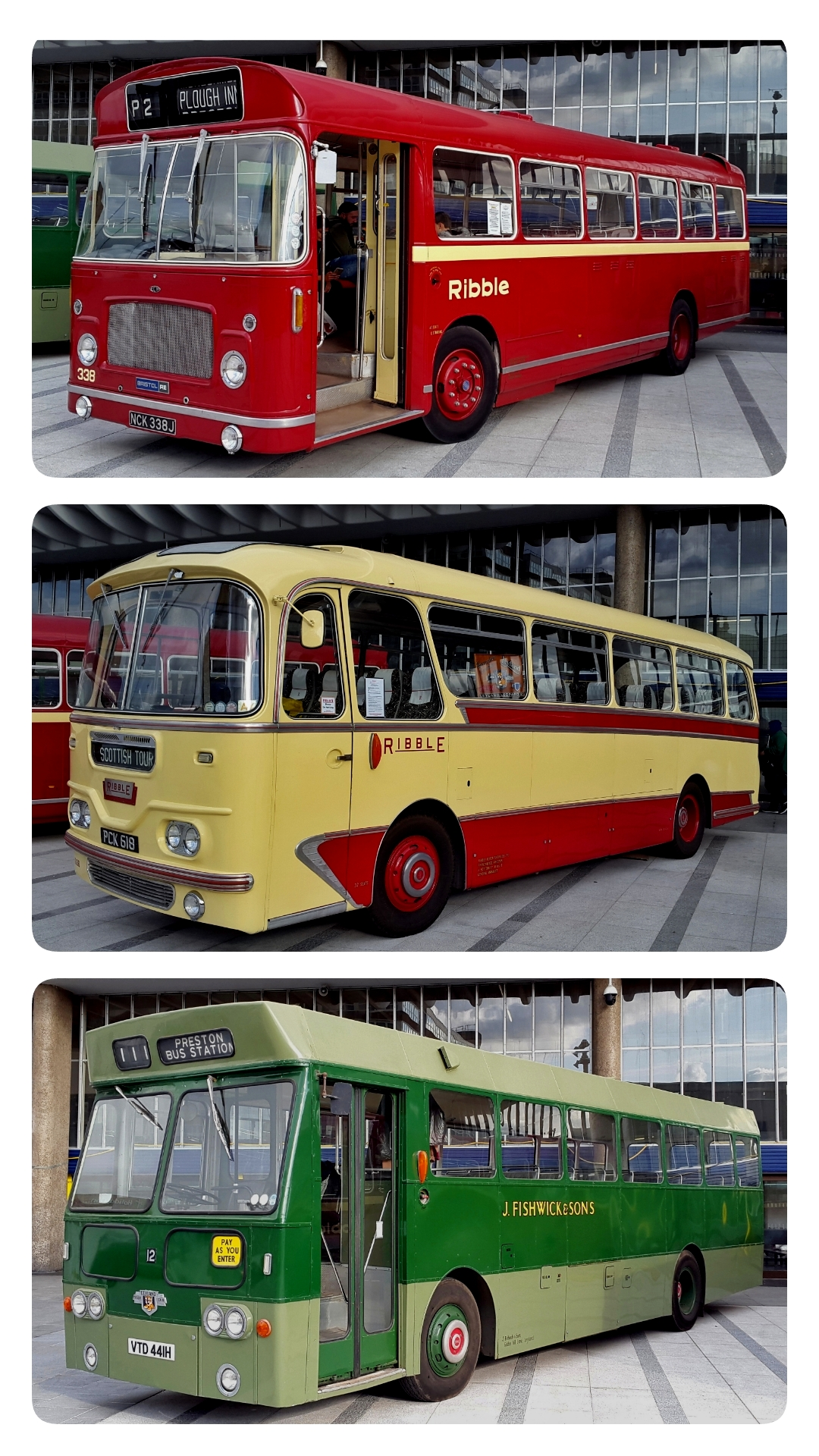
Historic buses on display for the 50th anniversary of the bus station in October 2019

In March 2019 the Preston City Council announced a series of events would take place in the summer and autumn to celebrate the bus station's 50th anniversary. An exhibit Beautiful and Brutal was held at the Harris Museum from 21 September–24 November 2019, and the public were asked to submit relevant photographs and personal memorabilia, some of which were also displayed at the bus station.

On 19 October 2019, almost 50 years to the day since its opening on 12 October 1969, festivities were held on the new public square in front of the bus station, which included free public entertainment and three historic buses were provided by the Ribble Vehicle Preservation Trust "so the three main users of the bus station were represented".

== Awards ==
In May 2019 the bus station's refurbishment project received three Royal Institute of British Architects (RIBA) North West regional awards:

- The project won the overall Regional Award
- Project consultants John Puttich Associates and Cassidy+Ashton won the Conservation Award
- The Lancashire County Council won the Client of the Year Award

As a regional winner, the bus station was also a nominee for and won a RIBA National Award and received long-listing for the 2019 RIBA Stirling Prize but did not make the short list.

== Media appearances ==
The bus station featured in a song on the children's show All Over the Place.

The bus station featured in the architectural documentary series, Nairn Across Britain, in 1972.

On Good Friday 2012, it was the venue for the Preston Passion, a passion play involving thousands of people forming a "human cross", broadcast live on BBC Television.

The bus station was featured in a two-part television series by Jonathan Meades, Bunkers, Brutalism, Bloodymindedness: Concrete Poetry (2014).

It is the subject of 56,000, a short film by Paul Adams and Andrew Wilson.

It was used as a filming location for scenes in the film Ip Man 4: The Finale (2019).

The station was the subject of a collection of publications by Craig Atkinson of Café Royal Books, which were put together as a set to celebrate the 50th anniversary of the opening of the station.

== Routes ==
Stagecoach Cumbria and North Lancashire, Preston Bus, Vision Bus, Tyrers Coaches, Archway Travel, Blackburn Bus Company and Holmeswood Coaches all run services out of the bus station.

The following routes run out of the bus station:

Number	Route	Operator	Via	Notes
1	Longridge	Stagecoach	Grimsargh	
1A	Red Scar	Stagecoach		
1	Walton-le-Dale	Stagecoach		Park and Ride
2	Southport	Stagecoach		
2A	Ormskirk	Stagecoach		
X2	Liverpool	Stagecoach	Southport	
3	Penwortham	Stagecoach		
6	Penwortham or Longridge	Preston Bus	Brookfield & Red Scar	
8	Moor Nook	Preston Bus	Ribbleton	
X8	Chorley or Keswick	Stagecoach		Saturday only / Summer only
9	Moor Nook	Stagecoach		
16	Farringdon Park	Preston Bus		
19	RPH or Larches	Preston Bus		
23	Fulwood Asda or Bamber Bridge	Preston Bus	RPH	
31	Lea	Preston Bus	Savick Estate	
35	Tanterton	Preston Bus	Ashton-on-Ribble	
40/41	Lancaster / Morecambe	Stagecoach	Garstang	40 only runs Mon-Sat
43	Cottam & RPH	Preston Bus		
44	Cottam	Preston Bus	Ingol	
45	Blackburn	Vision Bus	Longridge	
46	Longridge	Vision Bus	Woodplumpton	
48	Fulwood & Lea	Preston Bus		
59	Accrington	Stagecoach	Blackburn	
61	Blackpool	Stagecoach	Kirkham and Wesham	
68	Blackpool	Stagecoach	Lytham	
74	Fleetwood	Archway Travel		
75	Fleetwood	Archway Travel		
109	Chorley	Stagecoach/Vision Bus	Leyland	
110	Wigan	Holmeswood	Leyland	Mon-Sat only
111	Leyland or Tanterton	Stagecoach		
112	Midge Hall	Holmeswood	Leyland	Mon-Sat only
113	Leyland	Vision Bus		
114	Chorley	Tyrers Coaches	Leyland	
115	Chorley	Vision Bus	Leyland	
124	Chorley	Vision Bus		Mon-Sat only
125	RPH or Bolton	Stagecoach	Chorley	
152	Burnley	Blackburn Bus Company	Blackburn	
280	Skipton	Stagecoach	Clitheroe	

The following coach services run out of the station:

Number	Route	Operator
181	Glasgow or Birmingham	National Express
424	Blackpool or London via Manchester or Birmingham	National Express
