= Fylde Borough Council elections =

Local government elections in Lancashire, England

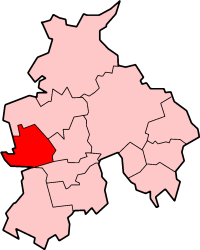
Fylde shown within the non-metropolitan county of Lancashire (Unitary authorities excluded)

Fylde Borough Council elections are held every four years to elect councillors to Fylde Borough Council in Lancashire, England. Since the last boundary changes in 2023 the council has comprised 37 councillors, representing 17 wards, with each ward electing one, two or three councillors.

== Council elections ==
- 1973 Fylde Borough Council election
- 1976 Fylde Borough Council election (New ward boundaries)
- 1979 Fylde Borough Council election
- 1983 Fylde Borough Council election
- 1987 Fylde Borough Council election
- 1991 Fylde Borough Council election
- 1995 Fylde Borough Council election
- 1999 Fylde Borough Council election
- 2003 Fylde Borough Council election (New ward boundaries increased the number of seats by 2)
- 2007 Fylde Borough Council election
- 2011 Fylde Borough Council election
- 2015 Fylde Borough Council election
- 2019 Fylde Borough Council election
- 2023 Fylde Borough Council election (New ward boundaries reduced number of seats from 51 to 37)

== Election results ==
	Overall control	Conservative	Labour	Lib Dems	Independent	Ratepayers
2023	Conservative	19	2	2	14	-
2019	Conservative	31	-	1	19 (Note: Includes 2 Lytham St. Anne's Independents.)	-
2015	Conservative	32	1	2	14	2
2011	Conservative	26	-	3	20	2
2007	Conservative	27	-	2	18	4
2003	Conservative	27	-	2	15	7
1999	NOC	21	2	3	12	11

== Borough result maps ==
2003 results map

2007 results map

2011 results map

2015 results map

2019 results map

2023 results map

== By-election results ==
=== 1995-1999 ===
Park By-Election 3 April 1997
Party	Candidate	Votes	%	±%
Conservative		556	42.2	
Ratepayer		312	23.7	
Liberal Democrats		278	21.1	
Labour		171	13.0	
Majority		244	18.5	
Turnout		1,317	42.0	
Conservative hold		Swing		

Kilnhouse By-Election 10 July 1997
Party	Candidate	Votes	%	±%
Conservative		516	45.2	+24.8
Labour		399	35.0	+11.6
Liberal Democrats		226	19.8	+0.0
Majority		117	10.2	
Turnout		1,141		
Conservative gain from Labour		Swing		

=== 1999-2003 ===
Singleton & Greenhalgh By-Election 7 June 2001
Party	Candidate	Votes	%	±%
Independent		unopposed		
Independent gain from Conservative		Swing		

Kilnhouse By-Election 24 January 2002 (2)
Party	Candidate	Votes	%	±%
Conservative	William Prestwich	451		
Conservative	Christine Akeroyd	446		
Ratepayers		288		
Ratepayers		258		
Liberal Democrats		250		
Liberal Democrats		171		
Labour		143		
Turnout		2,007	27.0	
Conservative gain from Independent		Swing		
Conservative gain from Independent		Swing		

=== 2003-2007 ===
Park By-Election 19 August 2004
Party	Candidate	Votes	%	±%
Resident		422	45.7	+13.0
Conservative		376	40.7	+4.4
Liberal Democrats	John Graddon	126	13.6	−4.6
Majority		46	5.0	
Turnout		924	23.6	
Independent gain from Conservative		Swing		

=== 2007-2011 ===
Clifton By-Election 26 November 2009
Party	Candidate	Votes	%	±%
Conservative	Leonard Davies	386	35.3	−10.9
Fylde Ratepayers Association	Frank Murphy	372	34.1	−6.5
Liberal Democrats	Mike Turner	241	22.1	+22.1
Labour	Janet Sherwood	80	7.3	−5.9
Green	Hilda Speakman	13	1.2	+1.2
Majority		14	1.2	
Turnout		1,092	29.5	
Conservative hold		Swing		

Ribby with Wrea By-Election 1 July 2010
Party	Candidate	Votes	%	±%
Conservative	Frank Andrews	292	52.2	+6.8
Independent	Janet Wardell	256	45.8	−8.7
Green	David Hobson	11	2.0	+2.0
Majority		36	6.4	
Turnout		559	47.0	
Conservative gain from Independent		Swing		

Kilnhouse By-Election 9 September 2010
Party	Candidate	Votes	%	±%
Liberal Democrats	Karen Henshaw	529	44.8	+21.9
Conservative	Matthew Lardner	459	38.8	+2.7
Labour	Peter Stephenson	165	14.0	+2.2
Green	Ian Roberts	29	2.5	+2.5
Majority		70	5.9	
Turnout		1,182	34.0	
Liberal Democrats gain from Conservative		Swing		

=== 2011-2015 ===
Heyhouses By-Election 5 July 2012
Party	Candidate	Votes	%	±%
Conservative	Barbara Nash	401	33.4	−26.7
Independent	Palmira Stafford	313	26.1	+26.1
Liberal Democrats	Carol Gilligan	163	13.6	+26.3
Green	Ian Roberts	150	12.5	+12.5
UKIP	Bill Dickson	147	12.3	+12.3
Integrity UK	Bill Whitehead	25	2.1	+2.1
Majority		88	7.3	
Turnout		1,199		
Conservative hold		Swing		

St Johns By-Election 27 March 2014
Party	Candidate	Votes	%	±%
Fylde Ratepayers Association	Mark Bamforth	804	65.7	+65.7
Conservative	Brenda Blackshaw	205	16.7	−23.9
UKIP	Timothy Wood	100	8.2	+8.2
Liberal Democrats	Carol Gilligan	62	5.1	−17.2
Green	Bob Dennett	53	4.3	+4.3
Majority		599	48.9	
Turnout		1,224		
Fylde Ratepayers Association gain from Conservative				

=== 2015-2019 ===
Clifton By-Election 10 December 2015
Party	Candidate	Votes	%	±%
Conservative	Peter Anthony	576	59.8	+13.9
UKIP	Tim Wood	128	13.3	+13.3
Independent	Noreen Griffiths	122	12.7	+12.7
Labour	Jed Sullivan	84	8.7	−9.6
Liberal Democrats	Luke Gibbon	53	5.5	+5.5
Majority		448	46.5	
Turnout		963		
Conservative hold		Swing		

St Johns By-Election 9 February 2017
Party	Candidate	Votes	%	±%
Fylde Ratepayers Association	Mark Bamforth	564	60.8	+15.9
Conservative	Paul Lomax	278	30.0	+4.4
Labour	Jayne Boardman	45	4.9	−8.3
Green	Paul Hill	40	4.3	+4.3
Majority		286	30.9	
Turnout		927		
Fylde Ratepayers Association hold		Swing		

Warton and Westby By-Election 4 May 2017
Party	Candidate	Votes	%	±%
Conservative	John Kirkham	884	58.0	+20.5
Independent	Daniel Docherty	359	23.6	+23.6
Labour	Jack James	280	18.4	−1.5
Majority		525	34.5	
Turnout		1,523		
Conservative hold		Swing		

Staining and Weeton By-Election 16 November 2017
Party	Candidate	Votes	%	±%
Conservative	Jayne Nixon	401	73.0	+8.4
Labour	Nick Ansell	111	20.2	−15.2
Liberal Democrats	Beverley Harrison	37	6.7	+6.7
Majority		290	52.8	
Turnout		549		
Conservative hold		Swing		

Heyhouses By-Election 5 April 2018
Party	Candidate	Votes	%	±%
Conservative	Sally Nash	655	58.1	+11.5
Labour	Lynn Goodwin	202	17.9	−13.3
Liberal Democrats	Andrew Holland	138	12.2	−10.0
Green	Ian Roberts	133	11.8	+11.8
Majority		453	40.2	
Turnout		1,128		
Conservative hold		Swing		

Ansdell By-Election 2 August 2018
Party	Candidate	Votes	%	±%
Conservative	Chris Dixon	715	72.4	+21.7
Labour	Gareth Nash	272	27.6	+5.1
Majority		443	44.8	
Turnout		987		
Conservative hold		Swing		

=== 2023-2027 ===
Warton By-Election 10 October 2024
Party	Candidate	Votes	%	±%
Conservative	Bobby Rigby	351	51.2	
Independent	Michael Brickles	223	32.5	
Labour	Ross Kelly	78	11.4	
Green	Jayne Walsh	34	5.0	
Majority		128	18.7	
Turnout		686		
Conservative gain from Independent		Swing		

Kilgrimol By-Election 5 December 2024
Party	Candidate	Votes	%	±%
Conservative	Karen Harrison	340	46.1	
Reform	Gus Scott	204	27.6	
Liberal Democrats	Christine Marshall	108	14.6	
Labour	Hannah Lane	86	11.7	
Majority		136	18.4	
Turnout		738		
Conservative hold		Swing		

Kirkham By-Election 5 December 2024
Party	Candidate	Votes	%	±%
Conservative	Adam Brierley	1,185	60.6	
Reform	Joshua Roberts	534	27.3	
Labour	Oliver Mills	129	6.6	
Liberal Democrats	Philip Morgan	107	5.5	
Majority		651	33.3	
Turnout		1,955		
Conservative gain from Independent		Swing		
