= List of United Kingdom locations: Ha-Ham =

The United Kingdom

This is part of the list of United Kingdom locations: a gazetteer of place names in the United Kingdom showing each place's locality and geographical coordinates.

== Ha ==
=== Haa-Hak ===
| Location | Locality | Coordinates (links to map & photo sources) | OS grid reference |
|---|---|---|---|
| Haaf Gruney | Shetland Islands | 60.66°N 00.83°W | HU635982 |
| Haa of Houlland | Shetland Islands | 60.71°N 01.03°W | HP5304 |
| Habberley | Worcestershire | 52.39°N 02.29°W | SO8077 |
| Habberley | Shropshire | 52.62°N 02.90°W | SJ3903 |
| Habergham | Lancashire | 53.79°N 02.28°W | SD8133 |
| Habertoft | Lincolnshire | 53.19°N 00.24°E | TF5069 |
| Habin | West Sussex | 50.99°N 00.86°W | SU8022 |
| Habrough | Lincolnshire | 53.60°N 00.27°W | TA1413 |
| Haccombe | Devon | 50.51°N 03.56°W | SX8970 |
| Haceby | Lincolnshire | 52.91°N 00.48°W | TF0236 |
| Hacheston | Suffolk | 52.18°N 01.36°E | TM3059 |
| Hackbridge | Sutton | 51.36°N 00.16°W | TQ2865 |
| Hackenthorpe | Sheffield | 53.34°N 01.38°W | SK4183 |
| Hackford | Norfolk | 52.57°N 01.03°E | TG0602 |
| Hackforth | North Yorkshire | 54.33°N 01.63°W | SE2493 |
| Hack Green | Cheshire | 53.02°N 02.53°W | SJ6448 |
| Hackland | Orkney Islands | 59.06°N 03.06°W | HY3920 |
| Hacklete | Western Isles | 58.20°N 06.85°W | NB1534 |
| Hackleton | Northamptonshire | 52.18°N 00.83°W | SP8055 |
| Hacklinge | Kent | 51.23°N 01.35°E | TR3454 |
| Hackman's Gate | Worcestershire | 52.39°N 02.16°W | SO8977 |
| Hackness | Somerset | 51.20°N 02.96°W | ST3345 |
| Hackness | North Yorkshire | 54.29°N 00.51°W | SE9790 |
| Hackney | Hackney | 51.54°N 00.06°W | TQ3484 |
| Hackney Wick | Tower Hamlets | 51.53°N 00.02°W | TQ3784 |
| Hackthorn | Wiltshire | 51.20°N 01.78°W | SU1545 |
| Hackthorn | Lincolnshire | 53.32°N 00.51°W | SK9982 |
| Hackthorpe | Cumbria | 54.60°N 02.71°W | NY5423 |
| Haclait | Western Isles | 57.41°N 07.31°W | NF8148 |
| Haconby | Lincolnshire | 52.81°N 00.36°W | TF1025 |
| Hacton | Havering | 51.53°N 00.21°E | TQ5484 |
| Haddacott | Devon | 50.99°N 04.13°W | SS5024 |
| Hadden | Scottish Borders | 55.61°N 02.35°W | NT7836 |
| Haddenham | Cambridgeshire | 52.35°N 00.14°E | TL4675 |
| Haddenham | Buckinghamshire | 51.76°N 00.92°W | SP7408 |
| Haddenham End Field | Cambridgeshire | 52.36°N 00.14°E | TL4676 |
| Haddington | Lincolnshire | 53.15°N 00.64°W | SK9163 |
| Haddington | East Lothian | 55.94°N 02.78°W | NT5173 |
| Haddiscoe | Norfolk | 52.50°N 01.59°E | TM4496 |
| Haddon | Cambridgeshire | 52.51°N 00.33°W | TL1392 |
| Hade Edge | Kirklees | 53.54°N 01.79°W | SE1405 |
| Hademore | Staffordshire | 52.66°N 01.75°W | SK1708 |
| Haden Cross | Sandwell | 52.46°N 02.06°W | SO9685 |
| Hadfield | Derbyshire | 53.46°N 01.98°W | SK0196 |
| Hadham Cross | Hertfordshire | 51.84°N 00.06°E | TL4218 |
| Hadham Ford | Hertfordshire | 51.87°N 00.07°E | TL4322 |
| Hadleigh | Suffolk | 52.03°N 00.94°E | TM0242 |
| Hadleigh | Essex | 51.55°N 00.60°E | TQ8187 |
| Hadleigh Heath | Suffolk | 52.03°N 00.89°E | TL9941 |
| Hadley | Worcestershire | 52.26°N 02.20°W | SO8663 |
| Hadley | Barnet | 51.64°N 00.20°W | TQ2496 |
| Hadley | Shropshire | 52.70°N 02.48°W | SJ6712 |
| Hadley Castle | Shropshire | 52.70°N 02.48°W | SJ6712 |
| Hadley End | Staffordshire | 52.77°N 01.80°W | SK1320 |
| Hadley Wood | Barnet | 51.65°N 00.17°W | TQ2697 |
| Hadlow | Kent | 51.22°N 00.33°E | TQ6350 |
| Hadlow Down | East Sussex | 50.99°N 00.17°E | TQ5324 |
| Hadlow Stair | Kent | 51.20°N 00.28°E | TQ6047 |
| Hadnall | Shropshire | 52.77°N 02.71°W | SJ5220 |
| Hadspen | Somerset | 51.08°N 02.50°W | ST6532 |
| Hadstock | Essex | 52.07°N 00.26°E | TL5544 |
| Hadston | Northumberland | 55.28°N 01.60°W | NZ2599 |
| Hady | Derbyshire | 53.22°N 01.41°W | SK3970 |
| Hadzor | Worcestershire | 52.25°N 02.13°W | SO9162 |
| Haffenden Quarter | Kent | 51.12°N 00.68°E | TQ8840 |
| Hafod | Swansea | 51.62°N 03.93°W | SS6694 |
| Hafod Grove | Pembrokeshire | 52.06°N 04.74°W | SN1244 |
| Hafodiwan | Ceredigion | 52.16°N 04.37°W | SN3854 |
| Hafod-y-Green | Denbighshire | 53.22°N 03.43°W | SJ0471 |
| Hafodyrynys | Caerphilly | 51.68°N 03.12°W | ST2299 |
| Hag Fold | Wigan | 53.53°N 02.49°W | SD6704 |
| Haggate | Lancashire | 53.81°N 02.19°W | SD8735 |
| Haggate | Oldham | 53.55°N 02.13°W | SD9107 |
| Haggersta | Shetland Islands | 60.20°N 01.31°W | HU3847 |
| Haggerston | Hackney | 51.53°N 00.08°W | TQ3383 |
| Haggerston | Northumberland | 55.68°N 01.93°W | NU0443 |
| Hagginton Hill | Devon | 51.20°N 04.07°W | SS5547 |
| Haggrister | Shetland Islands | 60.41°N 01.38°W | HU3470 |
| Haggs | Falkirk | 55.98°N 03.94°W | NS7978 |
| Haghill | City of Glasgow | 55.85°N 04.20°W | NS6265 |
| Hagley | Worcestershire | 52.42°N 02.13°W | SO9181 |
| Hagley | Herefordshire | 52.06°N 02.64°W | SO5641 |
| Hagloe | Gloucestershire | 51.75°N 02.46°W | SO6806 |
| Hagmore Green | Suffolk | 52.01°N 00.84°E | TL9539 |
| Hagnaby (Hannah cum Hagnaby) | Lincolnshire | 53.28°N 00.21°E | TF4879 |
| Hagnaby (East Kirkby) | Lincolnshire | 53.13°N 00.00°E | TF3462 |
| Hagnaby Lock | Lincolnshire | 53.11°N 00.01°W | TF3359 |
| Hague Bar | Derbyshire | 53.36°N 02.03°W | SJ9885 |
| Hagworthingham | Lincolnshire | 53.20°N 00.00°E | TF3469 |
| Haigh | Barnsley | 53.60°N 01.56°W | SE2912 |
| Haigh | Wigan | 53.57°N 02.60°W | SD6009 |
| Haigh Moor | Leeds | 53.71°N 01.57°W | SE2824 |
| Haighton Green | Lancashire | 53.80°N 02.66°W | SD5634 |
| Haighton Top | Lancashire | 53.80°N 02.68°W | SD5534 |
| Haile | Cumbria | 54.45°N 03.49°W | NY0308 |
| Hailes | Gloucestershire | 51.96°N 01.94°W | SP0430 |
| Hailey | Hertfordshire | 51.77°N 00.01°W | TL3710 |
| Hailey (West Oxfordshire) | Oxfordshire | 51.80°N 01.49°W | SP3512 |
| Hailey (South Oxfordshire) | Oxfordshire | 51.56°N 01.07°W | SU6485 |
| Hailsham | East Sussex | 50.85°N 00.25°E | TQ5909 |
| Hailstone Hill | Wiltshire | 51.64°N 01.88°W | SU0894 |
| Hail Weston | Cambridgeshire | 52.24°N 00.30°W | TL1662 |
| Haimwood | Powys | 52.73°N 03.02°W | SJ3116 |
| Hainault | Redbridge | 51.59°N 00.09°E | TQ4591 |
| Haine | Kent | 51.34°N 01.37°E | TR3566 |
| Hainford | Norfolk | 52.71°N 01.28°E | TG2218 |
| Hains | Dorset | 50.97°N 02.32°W | ST7719 |
| Hainton | Lincolnshire | 53.34°N 00.22°W | TF1884 |
| Hainworth | Bradford | 53.83°N 01.91°W | SE0638 |
| Hainworth Shaw | Bradford | 53.84°N 01.91°W | SE0639 |
| Hairmyres | South Lanarkshire | 55.75°N 04.23°W | NS6053 |
| Haisthorpe | East Riding of Yorkshire | 54.06°N 00.29°W | TA1264 |
| Hakeford | Devon | 51.09°N 03.98°W | SS6135 |
| Hakin | Pembrokeshire | 51.70°N 05.05°W | SM8905 |

=== Hal ===
| Location | Locality | Coordinates (links to map & photo sources) | OS grid reference |
|---|---|---|---|
| Halabezack | Cornwall | 50.16°N 05.22°W | SW7034 |
| Halam | Nottinghamshire | 53.07°N 01.00°W | SK6754 |
| Halamanning | Cornwall | 50.12°N 05.41°W | SW5631 |
| Halbeath | Fife | 56.07°N 03.41°W | NT1288 |
| Halberton | Devon | 50.89°N 03.42°W | ST0012 |
| Halcon | Somerset | 51.01°N 03.08°W | ST2425 |
| Haldens | Hertfordshire | 51.81°N 00.20°W | TL2414 |
| Hale | Somerset | 51.04°N 02.35°W | ST7527 |
| Hale | Surrey | 51.22°N 00.79°W | SU8448 |
| Hale | Hampshire | 50.97°N 01.73°W | SU1919 |
| Hale (Medway) | Kent | 51.35°N 00.54°E | TQ7765 |
| Hale (Thanet) | Kent | 51.35°N 01.27°E | TR2867 |
| Hale | Cumbria | 54.19°N 02.76°W | SD5078 |
| Hale | Trafford | 53.37°N 02.36°W | SJ7686 |
| Hale | Cheshire | 53.33°N 02.81°W | SJ4682 |
| Hale Bank | Cheshire | 53.34°N 02.78°W | SJ4883 |
| Hale Barns | Trafford | 53.36°N 02.31°W | SJ7985 |
| Halecommon | West Sussex | 51.00°N 00.86°W | SU8024 |
| Hale Coombe | Somerset | 51.30°N 02.83°W | ST4256 |
| Hale End | Waltham Forest | 51.60°N 00.01°W | TQ3891 |
| Hale Green | East Sussex | 50.90°N 00.20°E | TQ5514 |
| Hale Mills | Cornwall | 50.23°N 05.15°W | SW7542 |
| Hale Nook | Lancashire | 53.88°N 02.92°W | SD3943 |
| Hales | Norfolk | 52.51°N 01.50°E | TM3897 |
| Hales | Staffordshire | 52.90°N 02.43°W | SJ7134 |
| Hales Bank | Herefordshire | 52.14°N 02.57°W | SO6150 |
| Halesfield | Shropshire | 52.63°N 02.42°W | SJ7104 |
| Halesgate | Lincolnshire | 52.81°N 00.04°W | TF3226 |
| Hales Green | Norfolk | 52.51°N 01.49°E | TM3796 |
| Hales Green | Derbyshire | 52.96°N 01.73°W | SK1841 |
| Halesowen | Dudley | 52.44°N 02.07°W | SO9583 |
| Hales Park | Worcestershire | 52.37°N 02.33°W | SO7775 |
| Hales Place | Kent | 51.29°N 01.06°E | TR1459 |
| Hales Street | Norfolk | 52.43°N 01.16°E | TM1587 |
| Hale Street | Kent | 51.21°N 00.39°E | TQ6749 |
| Hales Wood | Herefordshire | 51.96°N 02.58°W | SO6030 |
| Halesworth | Suffolk | 52.33°N 01.49°E | TM3877 |
| Halewood | Knowsley | 53.35°N 02.84°W | SJ4485 |
| Half Moon Village | Devon | 50.76°N 03.57°W | SX8997 |
| Halford | Shropshire | 52.44°N 02.84°W | SO4383 |
| Halford | Warwickshire | 52.10°N 01.62°W | SP2645 |
| Halfpenny | Cumbria | 54.27°N 02.72°W | SD5387 |
| Halfpenny Furze | Carmarthenshire | 51.78°N 04.51°W | SN2713 |
| Halfpenny Green | Staffordshire | 52.51°N 02.26°W | SO8291 |
| Halfway | Wiltshire | 51.22°N 02.18°W | ST8747 |
| Halfway (Afon Gwydderig) | Carmarthenshire | 51.97°N 03.71°W | SN8232 |
| Halfway (Llanelli) | Carmarthenshire | 51.67°N 04.14°W | SN5200 |
| Halfway | Berkshire | 51.40°N 01.42°W | SU4068 |
| Halfway | Sheffield | 53.32°N 01.35°W | SK4381 |
| Halfway Bridge | West Sussex | 50.98°N 00.67°W | SU9321 |
| Halfway Firs | Wiltshire | 51.42°N 02.21°W | ST8570 |
| Halfway House | Shropshire | 52.69°N 02.97°W | SJ3411 |
| Halfway Houses | Kent | 51.42°N 00.77°E | TQ9373 |
| Halfway Houses | Bury | 53.57°N 02.36°W | SD7609 |
| Halfway Street | Kent | 51.17°N 01.21°E | TR2547 |
| Halfway Street | Bexley | 51.437°N 00.099°E | TQ460730 |
| Halgabron | Cornwall | 50.65°N 04.73°W | SX0788 |
| Halifax | Calderdale | 53.72°N 01.86°W | SE0925 |
| Halkburn | Scottish Borders | 55.65°N 02.84°W | NT4740 |
| Halket | East Ayrshire | 55.73°N 04.51°W | NS4252 |
| Halkirk | Highland | 58.51°N 03.49°W | ND1359 |
| Halkyn | Flintshire | 53.23°N 03.18°W | SJ2171 |
| Halkyn Mountain | Flintshire | 53.22°N 03.19°W | SJ2070 |
| Hallam Fields | Derbyshire | 52.94°N 01.30°W | SK4739 |
| Halland | East Sussex | 50.92°N 00.13°E | TQ5016 |
| Hallaton | Leicestershire | 52.55°N 00.85°W | SP7896 |
| Hallatrow | Bath and North East Somerset | 51.31°N 02.53°W | ST6357 |
| Hallbankgate | Cumbria | 54.92°N 02.65°W | NY5859 |
| Hall Bower | Kirklees | 53.62°N 01.78°W | SE1414 |
| Hall Broom | Sheffield | 53.39°N 01.59°W | SK2789 |
| Hall Cross | Lancashire | 53.76°N 02.88°W | SD4230 |
| Hall Dunnerdale | Cumbria | 54.34°N 03.21°W | SD2195 |
| Hallen | South Gloucestershire | 51.51°N 02.64°W | ST5580 |
| Hallend | Warwickshire | 52.30°N 01.81°W | SP1367 |
| Hall End (Wootton) | Bedfordshire | 52.09°N 00.54°W | TL0045 |
| Hall End (Maulden) | Bedfordshire | 52.02°N 00.44°W | TL0737 |
| Hall End | South Gloucestershire | 51.57°N 02.43°W | ST7086 |
| Hall End | Lincolnshire | 53.02°N 00.13°E | TF4350 |
| Hall End | Warwickshire | 52.59°N 01.63°W | SK2500 |
| Hallew | Cornwall | 50.39°N 04.81°W | SX0059 |
| Hallfield Gate | Derbyshire | 53.11°N 01.41°W | SK3958 |
| Hall Flat | Worcestershire | 52.35°N 02.04°W | SO9773 |
| Hallgarth | Durham | 54.78°N 01.48°W | NZ3343 |
| Hall Garth | York | 53.95°N 00.98°W | SE6751 |
| Hallglen | Falkirk | 55.98°N 03.78°W | NS8978 |
| Hall Green | Birmingham | 52.42°N 01.83°W | SP1181 |
| Hall Green | Cheshire | 53.10°N 02.25°W | SJ8356 |
| Hall Green | Coventry | 52.43°N 01.48°W | SP3582 |
| Hall Green | Essex | 52.01°N 00.59°E | TL7838 |
| Hall Green (South Ribble) | Lancashire | 53.71°N 02.81°W | SD4624 |
| Hall Green (West Lancs) | Lancashire | 53.53°N 02.74°W | SD5105 |
| Hall Green | Sandwell | 52.54°N 02.00°W | SP0094 |
| Hall Green | Wakefield | 53.63°N 01.53°W | SE3115 |
| Hall Green | Wrexham | 52.97°N 02.76°W | SJ4942 |
| Hall Grove | Hertfordshire | 51.78°N 00.18°W | TL2511 |
| Halliburton | Scottish Borders | 55.61°N 02.82°W | NT4836 |
| Hallin | Highland | 57.52°N 06.59°W | NG2558 |
| Halling | Kent | 51.34°N 00.44°E | TQ7064 |
| Hallingbury Street | Essex | 51.84°N 00.20°E | TL5219 |
| Hallington | Northumberland | 55.06°N 02.03°W | NY9875 |
| Hallington | Lincolnshire | 53.34°N 00.04°W | TF3085 |
| Hall i' th' Wood | Bolton | 53.59°N 02.42°W | SD7211 |
| Halliwell | Bolton | 53.58°N 02.45°W | SD7010 |
| Hallmoss | Aberdeenshire | 57.52°N 01.83°W | NK1048 |
| Hallon | Shropshire | 52.56°N 02.37°W | SO7596 |
| Hallonsford | Shropshire | 52.56°N 02.37°W | SO7596 |
| Halloughton | Nottinghamshire | 53.05°N 00.98°W | SK6851 |
| Hallow | Worcestershire | 52.22°N 02.26°W | SO8258 |
| Hallowes | Derbyshire | 53.28°N 01.47°W | SK3577 |
| Hallow Heath | Worcestershire | 52.22°N 02.26°W | SO8259 |
| Hallowsgate | Cheshire | 53.19°N 02.72°W | SJ5267 |
| Hallsands | Devon | 50.23°N 03.66°W | SX8138 |
| Hall Santon | Cumbria | 54.39°N 03.38°W | NY1001 |
| Hall's Cross | East Sussex | 50.85°N 00.38°E | TQ6809 |
| Hallsford Bridge | Essex | 51.69°N 00.25°E | TL5602 |
| Halls Green | Essex | 51.75°N 00.04°E | TL4108 |
| Hall's Green | Kent | 51.22°N 00.17°E | TQ5249 |
| Hall's Green | Hertfordshire | 51.93°N 00.15°W | TL2728 |
| Hallspill | Devon | 50.98°N 04.18°W | SS4723 |
| Hallthwaites | Cumbria | 54.25°N 03.26°W | SD1885 |
| Hall Waberthwaite | Cumbria | 54.34°N 03.38°W | SD1095 |
| Hallwood Green | Herefordshire | 51.99°N 02.48°W | SO6733 |
| Hallworthy | Cornwall | 50.65°N 04.57°W | SX1887 |
| Hallyards | Scottish Borders | 55.62°N 03.25°W | NT2137 |
| Hallyne | Scottish Borders | 55.64°N 03.28°W | NT1940 |
| Halmer End | Staffordshire | 53.03°N 02.31°W | SJ7949 |
| Halmond's Frome | Herefordshire | 52.12°N 02.48°W | SO6747 |
| Halmore | Gloucestershire | 51.71°N 02.45°W | SO6902 |
| Halmyre Mains | Scottish Borders | 55.72°N 03.32°W | NT1749 |
| Halnaker | West Sussex | 50.86°N 00.72°W | SU9008 |
| Halsall | Lancashire | 53.58°N 02.96°W | SD3610 |
| Halse | Somerset | 51.03°N 03.22°W | ST1427 |
| Halse | Northamptonshire | 52.05°N 01.18°W | SP5640 |
| Halsetown | Cornwall | 50.18°N 05.50°W | SW5038 |
| Halsfordwood | Devon | 50.72°N 03.60°W | SX8793 |
| Halsham | East Riding of Yorkshire | 53.72°N 00.07°W | TA2727 |
| Halsinger | Devon | 51.12°N 04.13°W | SS5138 |
| Halstead | Essex | 51.93°N 00.63°E | TL8130 |
| Halstead | Kent | 51.32°N 00.12°E | TQ4861 |
| Halstead | Leicestershire | 52.63°N 00.89°W | SK7505 |
| Halstock | Dorset | 50.86°N 02.66°W | ST5308 |
| Halsway | Somerset | 51.12°N 03.25°W | ST1237 |
| Haltcliff Bridge | Cumbria | 54.71°N 02.99°W | NY3636 |
| Halterworth | Hampshire | 50.98°N 01.47°W | SU3721 |
| Haltham | Lincolnshire | 53.15°N 00.14°W | TF2463 |
| Haltoft End | Lincolnshire | 52.98°N 00.02°E | TF3645 |
| Halton | Buckinghamshire | 51.78°N 00.74°W | SP8710 |
| Halton | Northumberland | 54.99°N 02.01°W | NY9967 |
| Halton | Lancashire | 54.06°N 02.76°W | SD5064 |
| Halton | Leeds | 53.79°N 01.48°W | SE3433 |
| Halton | Cheshire | 53.32°N 02.70°W | SJ5381 |
| Halton | Wrexham | 52.94°N 03.04°W | SJ3039 |
| Halton Barton | Cornwall | 50.46°N 04.25°W | SX4065 |
| Halton Brook | Cheshire | 53.33°N 02.72°W | SJ5282 |
| Halton East | North Yorkshire | 53.97°N 01.94°W | SE0453 |
| Halton Fenside | Lincolnshire | 53.14°N 00.12°E | TF4263 |
| Halton Gill | North Yorkshire | 54.18°N 02.18°W | SD8876 |
| Halton Green | Lancashire | 54.07°N 02.75°W | SD5165 |
| Halton Holegate | Lincolnshire | 53.16°N 00.10°E | TF4165 |
| Halton Lea Gate | Northumberland | 54.91°N 02.54°W | NY6558 |
| Halton Moor | Leeds | 53.79°N 01.48°W | SE3433 |
| Halton Shields | Northumberland | 55.00°N 01.98°W | NZ0168 |
| Halton View | Cheshire | 53.36°N 02.72°W | SJ5286 |
| Halton West | North Yorkshire | 53.98°N 02.24°W | SD8454 |
| Haltwhistle | Northumberland | 54.97°N 02.47°W | NY7064 |
| Halvergate | Norfolk | 52.59°N 01.57°E | TG4206 |
| Halvosso | Cornwall | 50.15°N 05.16°W | SW7433 |
| Halwell | Devon | 50.36°N 03.73°W | SX7753 |
| Halwill | Devon | 50.76°N 04.24°W | SX4299 |
| Halwill Junction | Devon | 50.77°N 04.21°W | SS4400 |
| Halwin | Cornwall | 50.15°N 05.23°W | SW6933 |

=== Ham ===
| Location | Locality | Coordinates (links to map & photo sources) | OS grid reference |
|---|---|---|---|
| Ham (Stockland) | Devon | 50.80°N 03.09°W | ST2301 |
| Ham (Plymouth) | Devon | 50.39°N 04.16°W | SX4657 |
| Ham (Charlton Kings) | Gloucestershire | 51.88°N 02.04°W | SO9721 |
| Ham (Berkeley) | Gloucestershire | 51.68°N 02.46°W | ST6898 |
| Ham | Highland | 58.63°N 03.32°W | ND2373 |
| Ham | Kent | 51.23°N 01.32°E | TR3254 |
| Ham | Richmond Upon Thames | 51.43°N 00.31°W | TQ1772 |
| Ham | Shetland Islands | 60.13°N 02.05°W | HT9739 |
| Ham (Creech St Michael) | Somerset | 51.02°N 03.02°W | ST2825 |
| Ham (Coleford) | Somerset | 51.23°N 02.47°W | ST6748 |
| Ham (Wellington) | Somerset | 50.98°N 03.21°W | ST1521 |
| Ham (Combe St Nicholas) | Somerset | 50.91°N 03.01°W | ST2913 |
| Ham | Wiltshire | 51.35°N 01.52°W | SU3362 |
| Hamar | Shetland Islands | 60.46°N 01.43°W | HU3176 |
| Hamaramore | Highland | 57.44°N 06.73°W | NG1649 |
| Hamaraverin | Highland | 57.44°N 06.73°W | NG1649 |
| Hamarhill | Orkney Islands | 59.20°N 02.75°W | HY5736 |
| Hamars | Shetland Islands | 60.35°N 01.27°W | HU4064 |
| Hambleden | Buckinghamshire | 51.56°N 00.87°W | SU7886 |
| Hambledon | Surrey | 51.13°N 00.62°W | SU9638 |
| Hambledon | Hampshire | 50.92°N 01.09°W | SU6414 |
| Hamble-le-Rice | Hampshire | 50.85°N 01.33°W | SU4706 |
| Hambleton | Lancashire | 53.87°N 02.95°W | SD3742 |
| Hambleton (Selby) | North Yorkshire | 53.76°N 01.16°W | SE5530 |
| Hambleton (Craven) | North Yorkshire | 53.97°N 01.92°W | SE0553 |
| Hambleton Moss Side | Lancashire | 53.87°N 02.94°W | SD3842 |
| Hambridge | Somerset | 50.98°N 02.87°W | ST3921 |
| Hambrook | West Sussex | 50.84°N 00.89°W | SU7806 |
| Hambrook | South Gloucestershire | 51.49°N 02.52°W | ST6478 |
| Ham Common | Dorset | 51.02°N 02.27°W | ST8125 |
| Hameringham | Lincolnshire | 53.18°N 00.04°W | TF3167 |
| Hamerton | Cambridgeshire | 52.39°N 00.34°W | TL1379 |
| Hametoun | Shetland Islands | 60.11°N 02.07°W | HT9637 |
| Ham Green | Buckinghamshire | 51.85°N 00.99°W | SP6918 |
| Ham Green | Hampshire | 51.06°N 01.38°W | SU4330 |
| Ham Green | Herefordshire | 52.09°N 02.38°W | SO7444 |
| Ham Green (Wittersham) | Kent | 51.00°N 00.69°E | TQ8926 |
| Ham Green (Upchurch) | Kent | 51.38°N 00.64°E | TQ8468 |
| Ham Green | North Somerset | 51.47°N 02.67°W | ST5375 |
| Ham Green | Wiltshire | 51.34°N 02.21°W | ST8561 |
| Ham Green | Worcestershire | 52.26°N 01.98°W | SP0163 |
| Ham Hill | Kent | 51.31°N 00.43°E | TQ7060 |
| Hamilton | South Lanarkshire | 55.77°N 04.04°W | NS7255 |
| Hamister | Shetland Islands | 60.34°N 01.02°W | HU5463 |
| Hamlet | Dorset | 50.87°N 02.58°W | ST5908 |
| Hamlet | Devon | 50.78°N 03.22°W | SY1499 |
| Hammarhill | Orkney Islands | 59.20°N 02.77°W | HY5636 |
| Hammer | West Sussex | 51.08°N 00.75°W | SU8732 |
| Hammer Bottom | Hampshire | 51.08°N 00.77°W | SU8632 |
| Hammerfield | Hertfordshire | 51.75°N 00.49°W | TL0407 |
| Hammerpot | West Sussex | 50.83°N 00.49°W | TQ0605 |
| Hammersmith | Hammersmith and Fulham | 51.49°N 00.24°W | TQ2279 |
| Hammersmith | Derbyshire | 53.05°N 01.41°W | SK3951 |
| Hammerwich | Staffordshire | 52.66°N 01.91°W | SK0607 |
| Hammerwood | East Sussex | 51.13°N 00.04°E | TQ4339 |
| Hammill | Kent | 51.24°N 01.28°E | TR2955 |
| Hamm Moor | Surrey | 51.36°N 00.47°W | TQ0664 |
| Hammond's Green | Hampshire | 50.91°N 01.51°W | SU3413 |
| Hammond Street | Hertfordshire | 51.71°N 00.07°W | TL3304 |
| Hammoon | Dorset | 50.92°N 02.27°W | ST8114 |
| Hamnavoe (Esha Ness) | Shetland Islands | 60.50°N 01.58°W | HU2380 |
| Hamnavoe (West Burra) | Shetland Islands | 60.09°N 01.33°W | HU3735 |
| Hamnavoe (Yell) | Shetland Islands | 60.50°N 01.10°W | HU4980 |
| Hamnish Clifford | Herefordshire | 52.22°N 02.68°W | SO5359 |
| Hamp | Somerset | 51.11°N 03.00°W | ST3036 |
| Hampden Park | East Sussex | 50.79°N 00.26°E | TQ6002 |
| Hampen | Gloucestershire | 51.86°N 01.92°W | SP0519 |
| Hamperden End | Essex | 51.94°N 00.28°E | TL5730 |
| Hamperley | Shropshire | 52.49°N 02.87°W | SO4189 |
| Hampers Green | West Sussex | 50.98°N 00.61°W | SU9722 |
| Hampeth | Northumberland | 55.35°N 01.73°W | NU1707 |
| Hampnett | Gloucestershire | 51.83°N 01.87°W | SP0915 |
| Hampole | Doncaster | 53.58°N 01.24°W | SE5010 |
| Hampreston | Dorset | 50.78°N 01.93°W | SZ0598 |
| Hampsfield | Cumbria | 54.21°N 02.92°W | SD4080 |
| Hampson Green | Lancashire | 53.97°N 02.77°W | SD4954 |
| Hampstead | Camden | 51.55°N 00.18°W | TQ2685 |
| Hampstead Garden Suburb | Barnet | 51.57°N 00.18°W | TQ2688 |
| Hampstead Norreys | Berkshire | 51.48°N 01.25°W | SU5276 |
| Hampsthwaite | North Yorkshire | 54.01°N 01.60°W | SE2658 |
| Hampton | Devon | 50.75°N 03.05°W | SY2696 |
| Hampton | Kent | 51.36°N 01.10°E | TR1667 |
| Hampton | Richmond Upon Thames | 51.41°N 00.37°W | TQ1370 |
| Hampton | Shropshire | 52.47°N 02.38°W | SO7486 |
| Hampton | Swindon | 51.62°N 01.74°W | SU1892 |
| Hampton | Worcestershire | 52.08°N 01.97°W | SP0243 |
| Hampton Bank | Shropshire | 52.90°N 02.81°W | SJ4534 |
| Hampton Beech | Shropshire | 52.63°N 03.03°W | SJ3005 |
| Hampton Bishop | Herefordshire | 52.03°N 02.65°W | SO5538 |
| Hampton Fields | Gloucestershire | 51.68°N 02.17°W | ST8899 |
| Hampton Gay | Oxfordshire | 51.84°N 01.30°W | SP4816 |
| Hampton Green | Cheshire | 53.03°N 02.73°W | SJ5149 |
| Hampton Heath | Cheshire | 53.03°N 02.76°W | SJ4949 |
| Hampton Hill | Richmond Upon Thames | 51.42°N 00.36°W | TQ1471 |
| Hampton in Arden | Solihull | 52.42°N 01.70°W | SP2081 |
| Hampton Loade | Shropshire | 52.47°N 02.38°W | SO7486 |
| Hampton Lovett | Worcestershire | 52.28°N 02.17°W | SO8865 |
| Hampton Lucy | Warwickshire | 52.21°N 01.63°W | SP2557 |
| Hampton Magna | Warwickshire | 52.28°N 01.62°W | SP2665 |
| Hampton on the Hill | Warwickshire | 52.27°N 01.63°W | SP2564 |
| Hampton Park | City of Southampton | 50.93°N 01.38°W | SU4315 |
| Hampton Park | Herefordshire | 52.04°N 02.68°W | SO5339 |
| Hampton Poyle | Oxfordshire | 51.83°N 01.27°W | SP5015 |
| Hamptons | Kent | 51.24°N 00.31°E | TQ6252 |
| Hampton Wick | Richmond Upon Thames | 51.40°N 00.31°W | TQ1769 |
| Hamptworth | Wiltshire | 50.97°N 01.65°W | SU2419 |
| Hamrow | Norfolk | 52.78°N 00.83°E | TF9124 |
| Hamsey | East Sussex | 50.89°N 00.00°E | TQ4112 |
| Hamsey Green | Surrey | 51.31°N 00.06°W | TQ3559 |
| Hamshill | Gloucestershire | 51.70°N 02.33°W | SO7701 |
| Hamstall Ridware | Staffordshire | 52.76°N 01.85°W | SK1019 |
| Hamstead | Sandwell | 52.53°N 01.94°W | SP0493 |
| Hamstead | Isle of Wight | 50.72°N 01.44°W | SZ3991 |
| Hamstead Marshall | Berkshire | 51.38°N 01.41°W | SU4165 |
| Hamsterley (Consett) | Durham | 54.89°N 01.82°W | NZ1156 |
| Hamsterley (Bishop Auckland) | Durham | 54.67°N 01.83°W | NZ1131 |
| Hamstreet | Kent | 51.06°N 00.85°E | TR0033 |
| Ham Street | Somerset | 51.10°N 02.64°W | ST5534 |
| Hamworthy | Poole | 50.71°N 02.01°W | SY9991 |
