= Ham (disambiguation) =

Ham is a cut of meat from an edible mammal's rear, usually from a pig.

Ham or HAM may also refer to:

== People ==
- Ham (surname)
- Ham (son of Noah)
- Ham Allen (1846–1881), American baseball player
- Ham Avery (1854–1927), American lawyer and baseball player
- Ham Burrill (1903–1978), English speedway rider
- Ham Dowling (1895–1986), American football player and engineer
- Ham Fisher (1900–1955), American comic strip writer and cartoonist
- Ham Harmon (1913–1997), American football player
- Ham Hyatt (1884–1963), American baseball player
- Ham Iburg (1873–1945), American baseball player
- Ham Lambert (1910–2006), Irish cricketer and rugby union player
- Ham Lini (born 1951), ni-Vanuatu politician
- Ham Mukasa (1870–1956), a vizier in the court of Mutesa I of Buganda
- Hàm Nghi (1871–1944), Emperor of Đại Nam
- Ham Patterson (1877–1945), American baseball player
- Ham Richardson (1933–2006), American tennis player
- Ham Wade (1879–1968), American baseball player
- Ham people of Nigeria

== Places ==
=== Ancient places ===
- The Bible refers to Egypt as "the land of Ham" in several places: see Ham (Genesis)
- The Zuzim lived in Ham, a land east of the River Jordan

=== Belgium ===
- Ham, Belgium

=== France ===
- Le Ham, Manche, a commune
- Le Ham, Mayenne, a commune
- Ham (Cergy), a village near Cergy, Val-d'Oise
- Canton of Ham, a canton in the département of the Somme
  - Ham, Somme, a commune in the canton

=== United Kingdom ===
- Ham Island, River Thames, Berkshire, England
- Ham, East Devon, a location in Devon, England
- Ham, Plymouth, Devon, England
- Ham, Cheltenham, a location in Gloucestershire, England
- Ham, Stroud, in Ham and Stone parish, Gloucestershire, England
- Ham, Kent, England
- Ham, London, in Richmond upon Thames
- Ham, Creech St Michael, a location in Somerset, England
- Ham, Mendip, a location in Somerset, England
- Ham, South Somerset, a location in Somerset, England
- Ham, West Buckland, a location in Somerset, England
- Ham, Wiltshire, England
- Ham, Caithness, Scotland
- Ham, Shetland, Scotland
- The Ham, Westbury, Wiltshire, England

=== United States ===
- Ham Lake (Hubbard County, Minnesota), a lake
- Ham Lake (Morrison County, Minnesota), a lake
- Winterham, Virginia or Ham

== Arts and entertainment ==
- Hammaglystwythkbrngxxaxolotl or Ham, a character in Badger comic books
- Ham, a setting in Farmer Giles of Ham by J.R.R. Tolkien
- HAM (band), an Icelandic rock band
- "H.A.M.", a song by Kanye West and Jay-Z
- H.A.M. (Happy Accessible Music), a 2016 EP by Joanna Wang
- A performer who overacts

== Acronyms ==
- Helsinki Art Museum
- Hindustani Awam Morcha (Secular) (abbreviated HAM-S or HAM-Se), a political party in Bihar, India
- His Apostolic Majesty, a style used by the Kings of Hungary
- Historic Arkansas Museum, Little Rock, Arkansas, United States
- Hold-And-Modify, a screen mode of the Commodore Amiga computer
- Homotopy analysis method
- Human asset management

== Codes ==
- Hamburg Airport's IATA code
- Hamlet (Amtrak station)'s station code
- Hewa language's ISO 639-3 code
- Hampshire, Chapman code
- Hampton railway station, Melbourne

== Other uses ==
- Ham (chimpanzee), the first hominid launched into outer space
- Ham, a shorthand for amateur radio or an amateur radio operator
- -ham, a generic suffix in place names in the British Isles meaning farm, e.g. Rotherham
- Ham-class minesweeper, a former British Royal Navy class
- Nippon Ham, a meat packing and food processing company founded in 1949 in Tokushima, Japan
- Tailor's ham, a curved mold for pressing garments
- $\mathop{\rm Ham}(M,\omega)$, the group of Hamiltonian symplectomorphisms of $(M,\omega)$

== See also ==
- Ham-en-Artois, a commune in Pas-de-Calais, France
- Ham-les-Moines, a commune in Ardennes, France
- Ham-Nord, Quebec, Canada
- Ham-sur-Heure-Nalinnes, Belgium, a municipality
- Ham-sur-Meuse, a commune in Ardennes, France
- Ham-sous-Varsberg, a commune in Moselle, France
- Ham-Sud, Quebec, Canada
- Hamm (disambiguation)
- Hamming (disambiguation)
- Newham, a London borough
  - East Ham
  - West Ham
- South Hams, England
- Van der Ham, a Dutch surname
