= Ham Lake (disambiguation) =

Ham Lake is a city in Minnesota, United States.

Ham Lake may also refer to:

- Ham Lake (Parry Sound District), a lake in Parry Sound District, Ontario
- Ham Lake (Thunder Bay District), a lake in Thunder Bay District, Ontario
- Ham Lake (Sudbury District), a lake in Sudbury District, Ontario
- Ham Lake (Kenora District), a lake in Kenora District, Ontario
- Ham Lake (Hubbard County, Minnesota), a lake in Hubbard County, Minnesota
- Ham Lake (Morrison County, Minnesota), a lake in Morrison County, Minnesota
- Ham Lake (Burnett County, Wisconsin), a lake in Burnett County, Wisconsin
- Ham Lake (Forest County, Wisconsin), a lake in Forest County, Wisconsin
- Ham Lake (Sawyer County, Wisconsin), a lake in Sawyer County, Wisconsin
