= 2003 Fylde Borough Council election =

2003 UK local government election

Map of the results of the 2003 Fylde council election. Conservatives in blue, Independents in grey, Ratepayers in white and Liberal Democrats in yellow.

The 2003 Fylde Borough Council election took place on 1 May 2003 to elect members of Fylde Borough Council in Lancashire, England. The whole council was up for election with boundary changes since the last election in 1999 increasing the number of seats by two. The Conservative Party gained overall control of the council from no overall control.

== Election result ==
Fylde local election result 2003
Party	Seats	Gains	Losses	Net gain/loss	Seats %	Votes %	Votes	+/−
Conservative	27			+5	52.9	49.1	22,753	
Independent	15			+2	29.4	20.5	9,486	
Ratepayers	7			-2	13.7	14.6	6,786	
Liberal Democrats	2			-1	3.9	9.0	4,173	
Labour	0			-2	0	6.8	3,129	

Two Independent councillors were uncontested.

== Ward results ==
=== Ansdell ===
Ansdell (3)
Party	Candidate	Votes	%	±%
Ratepayer	Hilda Wilson	708		
Conservative	Eric Bamber	704		
Conservative	Elizabeth Clarkson	605		
Conservative	John Tavernor	547		
Liberal Democrats	Michael Niland	407		
Labour	Marjorie Sherwood	253		
Turnout		3,224	38.3	

=== Ashton ===
Ashton (3)
Party	Candidate	Votes	%	±%
Conservative	Colin Walton	725		
Ratepayer	Ronald Wilson	687		
Conservative	Barbara Pagett	672		
Conservative	Jon Harrison	639		
Liberal Democrats	Patricia Fielding	392		
Labour	Marion Stott	270		
Turnout		3,385	36.7	

=== Central ===
Central (3)
Party	Candidate	Votes	%	±%
Conservative	Susan Fazackerley	521		
Conservative	Dawn Prestwich	488		
Conservative	Fabian Wilson	414		
Ratepayer	Cheryl Little	359		
Liberal Democrats	Rosaleen Highton	277		
Labour	Ian Curley	229		
Turnout		2,288	25.5	

=== Clifton ===
Clifton (3)
Party	Candidate	Votes	%	±%
Conservative	William Thompson	874		
Conservative	Martin Taylor	722		
Conservative	Richard Fulford-Brown	651		
Ratepayer	Stephen Mason	609		
Ratepayer	David Mitchell	559		
Labour	Gareth Nash	232		
Turnout		3,647	41.3	

=== Elswick & Little Eccleston ===
Elswick & Little Eccleston
Party	Candidate	Votes	%	±%
Independent	Paul Hayhurst	529	74.4	
Conservative	Barrie Reed	160	22.5	
Labour	Eric Wood	22	3.1	
Majority		469	51.9	
Turnout		711	58.9	

=== Fairhaven ===
Fairhaven (3)
Party	Candidate	Votes	%	±%
Ratepayer	Richard Eastham	666		
Conservative	George Caldwell	632		
Conservative	Alfred Jealous	561		
Conservative	Martin Chatfield	446		
Liberal Democrats	Michael Turner	367		
Labour	Valerie Hughes	238		
Turnout		2,910	33.8	

=== Freckleton East ===
Freckleton East (2)
Party	Candidate	Votes	%	±%
Independent	James Mulholland	uncontested		
Independent	Thomas Threlfall	uncontested		

=== Freckleton West ===
Freckleton West (2)
Party	Candidate	Votes	%	±%
Independent	Trevor Fiddler	593		
Independent	Louis Rigby	519		
Conservative	Andrea Williams	139		
Labour	Vernon Allen	102		
Turnout		1,353	33.2	

=== Heyhouses ===
Heyhouses (3)
Party	Candidate	Votes	%	±%
Conservative	John Coombes	763		
Conservative	Elizabeth Clarke	752		
Conservative	Keith Hyde	699		
Liberal Democrats	Elizabeth Smith	515		
Liberal Democrats	William Greene	447		
Labour	Estelle Drummond	290		
Turnout		3,466	36.1	

=== Kilnhouse ===
Kilnhouse (3)
Party	Candidate	Votes	%	±%
Conservative	Roger Small	597		
Conservative	Christine Akeroyd	593		
Conservative	William Prestwich	560		
Ratepayer	Kenneth Harries	468		
Liberal Democrats	Beverley Harrison	319		
Labour	Peter Stephenson	276		
Turnout		2,813	33.4	

=== Kirkham North ===
Kirkham North (3)
Party	Candidate	Votes	%	±%
Independent	Keith Wright	1,161		
Independent	John Bennett	837		
Ratepayer	Stephen Wall	632		
Conservative	Peter Sowden	516		
Turnout		3,146	42.0	

=== Kirkham South ===
Kirkham South (2)
Party	Candidate	Votes	%	±%
Independent	Elizabeth Oades	587		
Ratepayer	Peter Hardy	344		
Conservative	Marjorie Sowden	281		
Turnout		1,202	33.2	

=== Medlar with Wesham ===
Medlar with Wesham (2)
Party	Candidate	Votes	%	±%
Independent	Linda Nulty	593		
Conservative	Simon Renwick	411		
Independent	Geoffrey Dixon	362		
Conservative	Patricia Page	292		
Turnout		1,532	34.7	

=== Newton & Treales ===
Newton & Treales (2)
Party	Candidate	Votes	%	±%
Independent	Heather Speak	729		
Independent	Peter Collins	576		
Conservative	Joyce McCormick	342		
Conservative	Michael Tomlinson	284		
Turnout		1,931	48.7	

=== Park ===
Park (3)
Party	Candidate	Votes	%	±%
Conservative	Patricia Fieldhouse	750		
Ratepayer	Stephen Carpenter	726		
Conservative	Arnold Horrocks	670		
Conservative	John McLaren	633		
Liberal Democrats	John Graddon	367		
Labour	Peter Willis	263		
Turnout		3,409	36.3	

=== Ribby with Wrea ===
Ribby with Wrea
Party	Candidate	Votes	%	±%
Independent	Derek Lancaster	378	55.2	
Conservative	Jack Dobson	307	44.8	
Majority		71	10.4	
Turnout		685	57.8	

=== Singleton & Greenhalgh ===
Singleton & Greenhalgh
Party	Candidate	Votes	%	±%
Independent	Maxine Chew	456	84.0	
Conservative	Angela Jacques	87	16.0	
Majority		369	68.0	
Turnout		543	39.8	

=== St John's ===
St John's (3)
Party	Candidate	Votes	%	±%
Conservative	Timothy Ashton	709		
Conservative	John Dolan	485		
Conservative	Raymond Norsworthy	474		
Ratepayer	John Joyner	388		
Labour	William Taylor	337		
Turnout		2,393	32.4	

=== St Leonard's ===
St Leonard's (3)
Party	Candidate	Votes	%	±%
Ratepayer	John Longstaff	640		
Liberal Democrats	Howard Henshaw	558		
Liberal Democrats	Karen Henshaw	524		
Conservative	Audrey Preston	373		
Conservative	Sharon Foley	346		
Conservative	Maurice Landsman	319		
Labour	Pauline Mortensen	199		
Turnout		2,959	35.5	

=== Staining & Weeton ===
Staining & Weeton (2)
Party	Candidate	Votes	%	±%
Conservative	Albert Founder	527		
Conservative	Andrea Whittaker	441		
Labour	Alfred Goldberg	418		
Turnout		1,386	39.6	

=== Warton & Westby ===
Warton & Westby (3)
Party	Candidate	Votes	%	±%
Independent	Janine Owen	657		
Independent	Paul Rigby	572		
Conservative	Harold Butler	551		
Conservative	Christopher Bates	491		
Independent	Barbara Douglas	371		
Independent	Michael Gilbert	286		
Independent	Thomas Smith	280		
Turnout		3,208	35.1	
