= Hamme (disambiguation) =

Hamme may refer to:

- Hamme (river), a river in Lower Saxony, Germany, forming the Lesum river together with the Wümme
- Hamme, Belgium, a town and municipality in East Flanders
  - K.F.C. V.W. Hamme, the football club from the Belgian town
- Hamme, Bochum, a quarter of Bochum, Germany
- Van Hamme, a number of people with this surname, most notably
  - Jean Van Hamme (born 1939), Belgian writer

== See also ==
- Hamm (disambiguation)
- Ham (disambiguation)
