= Van der Ham =

Van der Ham, Vanderham, Van Derham, Van den Ham, or Van Ham is a Dutch toponymic surname meaning "from the ham". The Dutch word ham (as well as hem) only survives in place names and used to refer to alluvial land in a curve of a river. Several places exist with the name Ham or Den Ham so that the surname, especially in the form Van Ham, could refer to a specific location.

Notable people with the surname include:

Van der Ham

- Boris van der Ham (born 1973), Dutch actor and politician
- Joanna Vanderham, Scottish actress
- Katarina Van Derham (born 1975), Slovak-American model, actress, and publisher
- Michael van der Ham (born 1985), Dutch womenswear designer

Van den Ham

- Marieke van den Ham (born 1983), Dutch water polo player
- Michael van den Ham (born 1992), Canadian cyclo-cross cyclist

Van Ham

- Herman van Ham (1931–2012), Dutch head chef
- Meindert van Ham (also Meindert van den Hamm; c.1470– aft.1545), military commander from Hamm
