= Tibrewal =

Tibrewal is an Indian (Marwadis) toponymic surname from Jhunjhunu in Rajasthan, India. Its variants include Tibrewala, Tibdewal and Tibarewal. The word "tibar" (or tiba) in the local Rajasthani language means small sand hills, and people who had their homes on such hilly areas in the desert region of Rajasthan were called Tibrewal. People with this surname or its variants include:

- Navrang Lal Tibrewal
- Sheo Bhagwan Tibrewal
- Hareesh Tibrewala
