= Charles Avery =

Charles Avery may refer to:

- Charles Avery (1784–1858) of Westchester County, New York, a Methodist Protestant denomination and an abolitionist, cotton merchant, and industrialist who founded Avery College in Pittsburgh, Pennsylvania
- Charles Avery (actor) (1873–1926), American actor
- Charles Avery (art historian) (born 1940), English art historian
- Charles Avery (artist) (born 1973), Scottish artist
- Charles Avery (pianist) (1892–1974), American pianist
- Ham Avery (Charles Hammond Avery, 1854–1927), American lawyer and baseball umpire
