= 2007 Fylde Borough Council election =

2007 UK local government election

Map of the results of the 2007 Fylde council election. Conservatives in blue, Independents in grey, Ratepayers in white and Liberal Democrats in yellow.

The 2007 Fylde Borough Council election took place on 3 May 2007 to elect members of Fylde Borough Council in Lancashire, England. The whole council was up for election and the Conservative Party stayed in overall control of the council.

== Election result ==
Fylde local election result 2007
Party	Seats	Gains	Losses	Net gain/loss	Seats %	Votes %	Votes	+/−
Conservative	27			+1	52.9	48.3	23,053	-0.8
Independent	18			+3	35.3	25.5	12,185	+5.0
Ratepayers	4			-4	7.8	8.2	3,930	-6.4
Liberal Democrats	2	1	1	0	3.9	13.2	6,314	+4.2
Labour	0	0	0	0	0.0	4.6	2,212	-2.2

2 Independents and 2 Conservatives were uncontested.

== Ward results ==
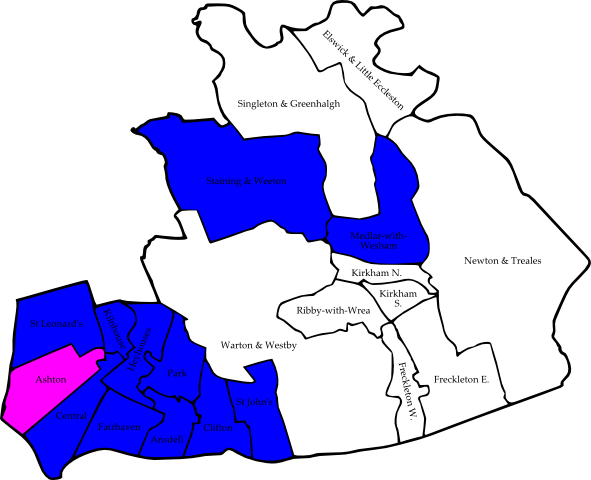
Map showing wards coloured by party which came top in each seat.

=== Ansdell ===
Ansdell (3)
Party	Candidate	Votes	%	±%
Conservative	Ben Aitken	886		
Conservative	Elizabeth Clarkson	827		
Conservative	David Eaves	810		
Ratepayer	Paula Tupling Prest	555		
Labour	Janet Sherwood	335		
Turnout		3,413		
Conservative gain from Independent		Swing		
Conservative hold		Swing		

=== Ashton ===
Ashton (3)
Party	Candidate	Votes	%	±%
Ratepayer	John Davies	698		
Liberal Democrats	Tony Ford	605		
Independent	Barbara Pagett	601		
Conservative	Colin Walton	555		
Liberal Democrats	Brian Bullick	539		
Conservative	Mike Knowles	498		
Conservative	Jon Harrison	470		
Turnout		3,966		
Independent hold		Swing		
Liberal Democrats gain from Conservative		Swing		
Independent gain from Conservative		Swing		

=== Central ===
Central (3)
Party	Candidate	Votes	%	±%
Conservative	Susan Fazackerley	540		
Conservative	Fabian Craig-Wilson	516		
Conservative	Dawn Prestwich	493		
Independent	Barbara Mackenzie	480		
Liberal Democrats	Annette Ford	332		
Turnout		2,361		
Conservative hold		Swing		
Conservative hold		Swing		

=== Clifton ===
Clifton (3)
Party	Candidate	Votes	%	±%
Conservative	Bill Thompson	840		
Conservative	Richard Fulford-Brown	739		
Independent	Ken Hopwood	725		
Conservative	Angela Fulford-Brown	710		
Labour	Gareth Nash	239		
Turnout		3,253		
Conservative hold		Swing		
Independent gain from Conservative		Swing		

=== Elswick and Little Eccleston ===
Elswick and Little Eccleston
Party	Candidate	Votes	%	±%
Independent	Paul Hayhurst	uncontested		
Independent hold		Swing		

=== Fairhaven ===
Fairhaven (3)
Party	Candidate	Votes	%	±%
Conservative	Cheryl Little	745		
Ratepayer	Richard Eastham	732		
Conservative	George Caldwell	578		
Conservative	Alfred Jealous	521		
Liberal Democrats	Michael Turner	405		
Turnout		2,981		
Conservative hold		Swing		
Independent hold		Swing		
Conservative hold		Swing		

=== Freckleton East ===
Freckleton East (2)
Party	Candidate	Votes	%	±%
Independent	Thomas Threlfall	628		
Independent	Kiran Mulholland	509		
Conservative	St John Greenhough	362		
Liberal Democrats	Kate Little	177		
Turnout		1,676		
Independent hold		Swing		

=== Freckleton West ===
Freckleton West (2)
Party	Candidate	Votes	%	±%
Independent	Trevor Fiddler	726		
Independent	Louis Rigby	701		
Liberal Democrats	Pam Winlow	130		
Turnout		1,557		
Independent hold		Swing		

=== Heyhouses ===
Heyhouses (3)
Party	Candidate	Votes	%	±%
Conservative	John Coombes	821		
Conservative	Keith Hyde	792		
Conservative	Craig Halewood	699		
Liberal Democrats	Elizabeth Smith	643		
Labour	David Meldrum	332		
Turnout		3,287		
Conservative hold		Swing		
Conservative hold		Swing		

=== Kilnhouse ===
Kilnhouse (3)
Party	Candidate	Votes	%	±%
Conservative	Christine Akeroyd	621		
Conservative	Roger Small	618		
Conservative	William Prestwich	575		
Ratepayer	David Serella	503		
Liberal Democrats	Bob Fielding	394		
Liberal Democrats	Christine Marshall	373		
Labour	Peter Stephenson	203		
Turnout		3,287		
Conservative hold		Swing		
Conservative hold		Swing		

=== Kirkham North ===
Kirkham North (3)
Party	Candidate	Votes	%	±%
Independent	Elaine Silverwood	852		
Independent	John Bennett	778		
Independent	Keith Beckett	569		
Conservative	Michelle Welch	450		
Conservative	Edward Oldfield	408		
Independent	James Cameron	225		
Labour	Cecil Adkins-Farmer	141		
Turnout		3,423		
Independent hold		Swing		
Independent gain from Independent		Swing		

=== Kirkham South ===
Kirkham South (2)
Party	Candidate	Votes	%	±%
Independent	Liz Oades	595		
Ratepayer	Peter Hardy	375		
Conservative	Barry Mitchell	189		
Conservative	Jim Proctor	139		
Labour	Vernon Allen	89		
Turnout		1,387		
Independent hold		Swing		

=== Medlar-with-Wesham ===
Medlar-with-Wesham (2)
Party	Candidate	Votes	%	±%
Conservative	Simon Renwick	714		
Independent	Linda Nulty	519		
Independent	Alan Clayton	403		
Labour	Bill Taylor	89		
Turnout		1,725		
Conservative hold		Swing		
Independent hold		Swing		

=== Newton & Treales ===
Newton & Treales (2)
Party	Candidate	Votes	%	±%
Independent	Heather Speak	724		
Independent	Peter Collins	696		
Labour	Dennis Davenport	168		
Turnout		1,588		
Independent hold		Swing		

=== Park ===
Park (3)
Party	Candidate	Votes	%	±%
Conservative	Patricia Fieldhouse	1,057		
Conservative	Michael Cornah	1,014		
Independent	David Chedd	872		
Liberal Democrats	John Graddon	688		
Labour	Peter Willis	327		
Turnout		3,958		
Conservative hold		Swing		
Independent gain from Independent		Swing		

=== Ribby with Wrea ===
Ribby with Wrea
Party	Candidate	Votes	%	±%
Independent	Lyndsay Greening	348	54.5	
Conservative	Janet Wardell	290	45.5	
Majority		58	9.0	
Turnout		638		
Independent hold		Swing		

=== Singleton & Greenhalgh ===
Singleton & Greenhalgh
Party	Candidate	Votes	%	±%
Independent	Maxine Chew	uncontested		
Independent hold		Swing		

=== St John's ===
St John's (3)
Party	Candidate	Votes	%	±%
Conservative	Tim Ashton	612		
Ratepayer	Kathleen Harper	596		
Conservative	Brenda Ackers	547		
Conservative	Raymond Norsworthy	471		
Labour	Maureen Dobson	289		
Turnout		2,515		
Conservative hold		Swing		
Independent gain from Conservative		Swing		
Conservative hold		Swing		

=== St Leonard's ===
St Leonard's (3)
Party	Candidate	Votes	%	±%
Conservative	Karen Buckley	624		
Liberal Democrats	Howard Henshaw	600		
Conservative	Angela Jacques	567		
Liberal Democrats	Karen Henshaw	563		
Ratepayer	Des Downey	471		
Liberal Democrats	Anne Fielding	336		
Turnout		3,161		
Conservative gain from Independent		Swing		
Liberal Democrats hold		Swing		
Conservative gain from Liberal Democrats		Swing		

=== Staining & Weeton ===
Staining & Weeton (2)
Party	Candidate	Votes	%	±%
Conservative	Albert Pounder	uncontested		
Conservative	John Singleton	uncontested		
Conservative hold		Swing		

=== Warton & Westby ===
Warton & Westby (3)
Party	Candidate	Votes	%	±%
Independent	Janine Owen	836		
Conservative	Paul Rigby	572		
Conservative	Barbara Douglas	627		
Conservative	Harold Butler	556		
Independent	Michael Gilbert	398		
Liberal Democrats	Janice Taylor	309		
Liberal Democrats	Bill Winlow	121		
Liberal Democrats	Mark Jewell	99		
Turnout		3,692		
Independent hold		Swing		
Conservative gain from Independent		Swing		
Conservative hold		Swing		
