= Hamm =

Hamm may refer to:

== Places ==
=== Germany ===
- Hamm, North Rhine-Westphalia, a city north-east of Dortmund
- Hamm (Sieg), a municipality in the eponymous Verbandsgemeinde in the district of Altenkirchen, Rhineland-Palatinate
- Hamm, Bitburg-Prüm, part of the Verbandsgemeinde Bitburg-Land, Rhineland-Palatinate
- Hamm am Rhein, part of the Verbandsgemeinde Eich, Rhineland-Palatinate
- Düsseldorf-Hamm, a borough of Düsseldorf
- Hamm, Hamburg, a neighborhood of Hamburg

=== Luxembourg ===
- Hamm, Luxembourg, a district of Luxembourg City

== People ==
- Hamm (surname), includes a list of people with the name

== Fictional characters ==
- Hamm (character), in Samuel Beckett's play Endgame
- Hamm (Toy Story), the piggy bank from the Pixar film Toy Story

== Other uses ==
- Hamm AG, a manufacturer of road rollers

== See also ==
- Ham (disambiguation)
- Hamme (disambiguation)
- Hammer (disambiguation)
