= 2023 Fylde Borough Council election =

2023 English local election

- 4 May 2023

All 37 seats to Fylde Borough Council 19 seats needed for a majority

	First party	Second party	Third party
Leader	Karen Buckley		N/A
Party	Conservative	Independent	Labour
Seats before	31	18 (Note: Includes two vacant seats previously held by independent councillors: Kirkham North, which was held by Paula Brearley until she resigned in January 2023, and Freckleton East, which was held by Kiran Mulholland until his death in early 2023. Of the 16 sitting independent politicians before the election, 14 formed the independent group which also included the Lytham St Annes Independents councillor, led by Matthew Lee. The other two independent councillors were not aligned to any group.)	0
Seats after	19	14	2
	Fourth party	Fifth party
Leader	N/A	N/A
Party	Liberal Democrats	Lytham St. Anne's Independent
Seats before	1	1
Seats after	2	0
- Results by ward
Leader before election
Karen Buckley
Conservative
Leader after election
Karen Buckley
Conservative

The 2023 Fylde Borough Council election took place on 4 May 2023 to elect councillors to Fylde Borough Council in Lancashire, England. This was on the same day as other local elections across England.

New ward boundaries took effect for this election, reducing the number of seats from 51 to 37.

== Results summary ==
Following the results, the council remained under Conservative control.

2023 Fylde Borough Council election
Party	Seats	Change
Conservative Party	19	▼1
Independents and Others	14	▼2
Labour Party	2	▲2
Liberal Democrats	2	▲1

Seat change compared to notional estimates for if the previous election had been held on the new ward boundaries used in 2023.

== Ward results ==
The results for each ward were as follows, with an asterisk indicating a sitting councillor standing for re-election:

=== Ansdell and Fairhaven ===
Ansdell and Fairhaven (2 seats)
Party	Candidate	Votes	%	±%
Conservative	Christopher Dixon* (Chris Dixon)	699	47.9	
Conservative	Richard Verran Redcliffe*	675	46.3	
Independent	Joseph Malcolm Shaw (Joe Shaw)	424	29.1	
Labour	Carol Ann Gradwell	375	25.7	
Green	Patricia Anne Fielding	324	22.2	
Independent	Debbie Lisa Hirst	206	14.1	
Majority				
Turnout		1,464	39.13	
Rejected ballots		5		
Conservative win (new seat)				
Conservative win (new seat)				

=== Ashton ===
Ashton (3 seats)
Party	Candidate	Votes	%	±%
Independent	Gail Goodman	538	36.2	
Labour	William Simon Taylor (Bill Taylor)	513	34.5	
Independent	Edward John Nash* (Ed Nash)	498	33.5	
Conservative	Karen Roberta Harrison	496	33.4	
Liberal Democrats	Beverley Susan Harrison	495	33.3	
Conservative	William Charles Angus Harris* (Will Harris)	473	31.8	
Conservative	Christopher Hembury (Chris Hembury)	413	27.8	
Reform	Debra Karen Challinor	157	10.6	
Majority				
Turnout		1,496	30.17	
Rejected ballots		10		
Independent win (new seat)				
Labour win (new seat)				
Independent win (new seat)				

Ed Nash had been a Conservative councillor prior to this election, but stood for re-election as an independent.

=== Carnegie ===
Carnegie (2 seats)
Party	Candidate	Votes	%	±%
Conservative	Cheryl Doreen Little*	712	53.8	
Conservative	Susan Mary Fazackerley*	649	49.0	
Labour	Ann Maria Derizzio	369	27.9	
Liberal Democrats	Christine Marshall	294	22.2	
Independent	Christopher Mark Webb	218	16.5	
Independent	David James George Robertson	190	14.4	
Independent	Jason Austin Mugridge	23	1.7	
Majority				
Turnout		1,330	33.94	
Rejected ballots		6		
Conservative win (new seat)				
Conservative win (new seat)				

=== Freckleton Village ===
Freckleton Village (2 seats)
Party	Candidate	Votes	%	±%
Independent	Noreen Griffiths*	701	54.5	
Conservative	Thomas Threlfall* (Tommy Threlfall)	594	46.2	
Conservative	Trevor John Fiddler*	531	41.3	
Labour	Joan Elizabeth Thompson	443	34.4	
Majority				
Turnout		1,289	34.52	
Rejected ballots		3		
Independent win (new seat)				
Conservative win (new seat)				

=== Heyhouses ===
Heyhouses (3 seats)
Party	Candidate	Votes	%	±%
Conservative	Vivienne Miller Willder* (Viv Willder)	752	48.5	
Conservative	Eleanor Campbell Gaunt* (Ellie Gaunt)	664	42.8	
Conservative	Vincent James Settle* (Vince Settle)	662	42.7	
Liberal Democrats	Stephen Robert Edward Phillips	565	36.4	
Labour	Victoria Eveline Miller (Viki Miller)	532	34.3	
Labour	Lynn Goodwin	469	30.2	
Independent	Joanna Renee Flowers	282	18.2	
Majority				
Turnout		1,562	33.70	
Rejected ballots		11		
Conservative win (new seat)				
Conservative win (new seat)				
Conservative win (new seat)				

=== Kilgrimol ===
Kilgrimol (2 seats)
Party	Candidate	Votes	%	±%
Independent	Timothy William Armit* (Tim Armit)	573	51.9	
Conservative	Gavin William Harrison*	525	47.5	
Conservative	Brian Robert McMillan	377	34.1	
Labour	Oscar Michael Marshall	333	30.1	
Majority				
Turnout		1,110	31.92	
Rejected ballots		5		
Independent win (new seat)				
Conservative win (new seat)				

=== Kilnhouse ===
Kilnhouse (3 seats)
Party	Candidate	Votes	%	±%
Liberal Democrats	Karen Maureen Henshaw*	817	45.7	
Conservative	Karen Elizabeth Buckley*	801	44.8	
Liberal Democrats	Joanne Lesley Gardner	742	41.5	
Conservative	Roger Stephen Small*	739	41.4	
Conservative	David O'Rourke*	593	33.2	
Labour	James Henry Robert Timms	456	25.5	
ADF	Cheryl Ann Morrison	225	12.6	
Majority				
Turnout		1,790	35.64	
Rejected ballots		3		
Liberal Democrats win (new seat)				
Conservative win (new seat)				
Liberal Democrats win (new seat)				

=== Kirkham ===
Kirkham (3 seats)
Party	Candidate	Votes	%	±%
Independent	Edward John Collins	1,006	58.5	
Independent	Damian Craig Buckley	1,005	58.4	
Independent	Paul Anthony Hodgson*	817	47.5	
Conservative	Anthony John Wellings (Tony Wellings)	507	29.5	
Labour	Jerrod William Sullivan (Jed Sullivan)	387	22.5	
Conservative	Stuart Robert Andrew Jones	373	21.7	
Conservative	Muaz Ashraf	302	17.6	
Majority				
Turnout		1,724	31.07	
Rejected ballots		4		
Independent win (new seat)				
Independent win (new seat)				
Independent win (new seat)				

=== Lytham East ===
Lytham East (2 seats)
Party	Candidate	Votes	%	±%
Independent	Mark Elliott Bamforth*	996	72.2	
Independent	Kelly Farrington	639	46.3	
Conservative	Elizabeth Frances Watson	336	24.4	
Conservative	Trevor Michael Hart	316	22.9	
Labour	Marjorie Janet Sherwood	248	18.0	
Majority				
Turnout		1,382	38.77	
Rejected ballots		3		
Independent win (new seat)				
Independent win (new seat)				

=== Lytham West ===
Lytham West (2 seats)
Party	Candidate	Votes	%	±%
Conservative	Peter Anthony*	828	56.5	
Conservative	Andrew James Redfearn	718	49.0	
Independent	Brenda Blackshaw*	506	34.5	
Independent	Paul O'Brien	266	18.2	
Labour	Gillian Rodgers Oliver	245	16.7	
Green	Roberta Mary MacDonald Black (Bobby Black)	235	16.0	
Majority				
Turnout		1,467	43.83	
Rejected ballots		2		
Conservative win (new seat)				
Conservative win (new seat)				

=== Medlar-with-Wesham ===
Medlar-with-Wesham (2 seats)
Party	Candidate	Votes	%	±%
Independent	Elizabeth Bickerstaffe	377	44.7	
Labour	Jordan Mark Ledger	271	32.1	
Independent	Darren Colin Goodlad	241	28.6	
Conservative	Kerry Annetta Jones	219	25.9	
Conservative	David John Deryck Preston (Dave Preston)	213	25.2	
Independent	Michael Anthony Devaney (Mick Devaney)	188	22.3	
Majority				
Turnout		845	26.67	
Rejected ballots		1		
Independent win (new seat)				
Labour win (new seat)				

=== Park ===
Park (2 seats)
Party	Candidate	Votes	%	±%
Conservative	Michael Stephen Withers* (Mike Withers)	745	49.6	
Conservative	Michelle Jacqueline Morris*	719	47.9	
Independent	Brian Douglas Gill*	646	43.0	
Independent	Timothy Davies Wood (Tim Wood)	359	23.9	
Labour	Peter James Stephenson	300	20.0	
Majority				
Turnout		1,505	44.45	
Rejected ballots		3		
Conservative win (new seat)				
Conservative win (new seat)				

=== Rural East Fylde ===
Rural East Fylde (2 seats)
Party	Candidate	Votes	%	±%
Independent	Peter Collins*	680	55.0	
Conservative	Martin Richard Evans	494	40.0	
Liberal Democrats	Philip James Morgan (Phil Morgan)	459	37.1	
Conservative	William Edmund Salisbury (Will Salisbury)	413	33.4	
Labour	Lorraine Shaw	232	18.8	
Majority				
Turnout		1,242	33.79	
Rejected ballots		6		
Independent win (new seat)				
Conservative win (new seat)				

=== Rural North Fylde ===
Rural North Fylde (2 seats)
Party	Candidate	Votes	%	±%
Independent	Paul Joseph Hayhurst*	682	62.9	
Independent	Matthew Everett Lee*	507	46.8	
Conservative	Stephen David Butler (Steve Butler)	329	30.4	
Labour	Karen Louise Elger	192	17.7	
Conservative	David Allan Jones	189	17.4	
Majority				
Turnout		1,086	36.00	
Rejected ballots		2		
Independent win (new seat)				
Independent win (new seat)				

=== Staining ===
Staining
Party	Candidate	Votes	%	±%
Conservative	Jayne Anne Nixon*	360	63.8	
Labour	Stewart Leigh French	204	36.2	
Majority				
Turnout		568	29.85	
Rejected ballots		4		
Conservative win (new seat)				

=== Warton ===
Warton (2 seats)
Party	Candidate	Votes	%	±%
Independent	Julie Ann Brickles*	518	53.2	
Conservative	Sandra Pitman	391	40.2	
Conservative	Robert Marsden Rigby* (Bobby Rigby)	370	38.0	
Labour	Philip J. Glaysher (Phil Glaysher)	355	36.5	
Majority				
Turnout		976	27.05	
Rejected ballots		3		
Independent win (new seat)				
Conservative win (new seat)				

=== Wrea Green with Westby ===
Wrea Green with Westby (2 seats)
Party	Candidate	Votes	%	±%
Conservative	Frank Roland Andrews*	655	55.4	
Conservative	John Arthur Kirkham*	609	51.5	
Green	Jayne Margaret Walsh	339	28.7	
Labour	Mark Andrew Smith	278	23.5	
Independent	Michael John Brickles	195	16.5	
Majority				
Turnout		1,186	35.08	
Rejected ballots		3		
Conservative win (new seat)				
Conservative win (new seat)				

== By-elections ==
=== Warton ===
The by-election was triggered by the death of independent councillor Julie Brickles, who had represented the ward (and its predecessor, Warton and Westby) since 2011.

Warton: 10 October 2024
Party	Candidate	Votes	%	±%
Conservative	Robert Rigby	351	51.2	+20.3
Independent	Michael Brickles	223	32.5	N/A
Labour	Ross Kelly	78	11.4	–16.7
Green	Jayne Walsh	34	5.0	N/A
Majority		128	18.7	N/A
Turnout		686	17.3	–9.8
Registered electors		3,976		
Conservative gain from Independent				

=== Kilgrimol ===
The by-election was triggered by the resignation of independent councillor Tim Armit, who had represented the ward for almost ten years and cited personal reasons alongside a broader criticism of the council.

Kilgrimol: 5 December 2024
Party	Candidate	Votes	%	±%
Conservative	Karen Harrison	340	46.1	+9.4
Reform	Gus Scott	204	27.6	N/A
Liberal Democrats	Christine Marshall	108	14.6	N/A
Labour	Hannah Lane	86	11.7	–11.6
Majority		136	18.5	N/A
Turnout		738	21.1	–10.8
Registered electors		3,494		
Conservative gain from Independent				

=== Kirkham ===
The by-election was triggered by the resignation of independent councillor Damian Buckley, who had been elected in 2023.

Kirkham by-election: 21 May 2026
Party	Candidate	Votes	%	±%
Conservative	Adam Brierley	1,185	60.6	+31.1
Reform	Joshua Roberts	534	27.3	N/A
Labour	Oliver Mills	129	6.6	–15.9
Liberal Democrats	Philip Morgan	107	5.5	N/A
Turnout		1,963	34.0	+2.9
Rejected ballots		8		
Registered electors		5,768		
Conservative gain from Independent				

== See also ==
- Fylde Borough Council elections
