= 1973 Fylde Borough Council election =

Election

- 10 May 1973

All 44 seats to Fylde Borough Council 23 seats needed for a majority

| | First party | Second party | Third party |
|---|---|---|---|
| Party | Conservative | Labour | Independent |
| Seats won | 28 | 2 | 11 |
| Popular vote | 32,124 | 3,988 | 13,132 |
| | Fourth party | Fifth party |
| Party | Liberal | Residents |
| Seats won | 2 | 1 |
| Popular vote | 4,194 | 1,053 |
Leader after election
Conservative

The 1973 Fylde Borough Council election took place on 10 May 1973. It was the first election to the newly formed Fylde Borough Council following the local government reorganisation of 1972. This was on the same day as other local elections in England.

== Election result ==
1973 Fylde Borough Council
| Party | Candidates | Seats | Gains | Losses | Net gain/loss | Seats % | Votes % | Votes | +/− |
|---|---|---|---|---|---|---|---|---|---|
| Conservative | 33 | 28 | | | | | | 32,124 | |
| Labour | 8 | 2 | | | | | | 3,988 | |
| Independent | 22 | 11 | | | | | | 13,132 | |
| Liberal | 5 | 2 | | | | | | 4,194 | |
| Residents | 1 | 1 | | | | | | 1,053 | |

== Ward Results ==
=== Ashton ===
Ashton (3 seats)
| Party | Candidate | Votes | % | ±% |
|---|---|---|---|---|
| Conservative | Dobson H. | 814 | 70.5 | |
| Conservative | Nicoll P. | 808 | | |
| Conservative | Nuttall H. | 753 | | |
| Independent | Hainsworth I. Ms. | 340 | 29.5 | |
| Turnout | | 2,715 | 38.2 | |
| Conservative win (new seat) | | | | |
| Conservative win (new seat) | | | | |
| Conservative win (new seat) | | | | |

=== Bryning With Warton ===
Bryning With Warton (2 seats)
| Party | Candidate | Votes | % | ±% |
|---|---|---|---|---|
| Conservative | Rigby W. | 783 | 49.4 | |
| Independent | Howorth D. | 621 | 39.2 | |
| Independent | Gilbert J. | 482 | | |
| Labour | Wright A. | 182 | 11.5 | |
| Turnout | | 2,068 | 71.9 | |
| Conservative win (new seat) | | | | |
| Independent win (new seat) | | | | |

=== Central ===
Central (3 seats)
| Party | Candidate | Votes | % | ±% |
|---|---|---|---|---|
| Conservative | Jordan R. | 865 | 66.5 | |
| Conservative | Utley N. | 861 | | |
| Conservative | Middleton A. Ms. | 842 | | |
| Labour | Horridge N. | 436 | 33.5 | |
| Turnout | | 3,004 | 34.9 | |
| Conservative win (new seat) | | | | |
| Conservative win (new seat) | | | | |
| Conservative win (new seat) | | | | |

=== Newton & Treales ===
Newton & Treales (2 seats)
| Party | Candidate | Votes | % | ±% |
|---|---|---|---|---|
| Independent | Braithwaite L. | 574 | 100.0 | |
| Independent | Armstrong S. | 490 | | |
| Independent | Williams L. | 339 | | |
| Turnout | | 1,403 | 29.3 | |
| Independent win (new seat) | | | | |
| Independent win (new seat) | | | | |

=== Singleton ===
Singleton (1 seat)
| Party | Candidate | Votes | % | ±% |
|---|---|---|---|---|
| Conservative | Loftus W. | 399 | 71.3 | |
| Liberal | Rock S. | 161 | 28.8 | |
| Turnout | | 560 | 40.2 | |
| Conservative win (new seat) | | | | |

=== Freckleton ===
Freckleton (3 seats)
| Party | Candidate | Votes | % | ±% |
|---|---|---|---|---|
| Conservative | Payne J. | 1,084 | 40.4 | |
| Independent | Spencer R. | 1,078 | 40.2 | |
| Labour | Garth H. | 518 | 19.3 | |
| Independent | Cooke E. Ms. | 493 | | |
| Conservative | Millingham C. | 364 | | |
| Turnout | | 3,537 | 71.6 | |
| Conservative win (new seat) | | | | |
| Independent win (new seat) | | | | |
| Labour win (new seat) | | | | |

=== Medlar-With-Wesham ===
Medlar-With-Wesham (2 seats)
| Party | Candidate | Votes | % | ±% |
|---|---|---|---|---|
| Independent | Bamber G. | 744 | 100.0 | |
| Independent | Carr M. Ms. | 471 | | |
| Independent | Cartmell S. | 392 | | |
| Independent | Cookson L. | 219 | | |
| Turnout | | 1,826 | 30.8 | |
| Independent win (new seat) | | | | |
| Independent win (new seat) | | | | |

=== Heyhouses ===
Heyhouses (5 seats)
| Party | Candidate | Votes | % | ±% |
|---|---|---|---|---|
| Conservative | Joyce R. | 1,556 | 46.4 | |
| Conservative | Corbett M. | 1,510 | | |
| Conservative | Knight A. | 1,479 | | |
| Conservative | Mason J. Ms. | 1,436 | | |
| Conservative | Williamson R. | 1,324 | | |
| Liberal | Sumner K. | 1,085 | 32.3 | |
| Labour | Bostock F. | 715 | 21.3 | |
| Turnout | | 9,105 | 45.5 | |
| Conservative win (new seat) | | | | |
| Conservative win (new seat) | | | | |
| Conservative win (new seat) | | | | |
| Conservative win (new seat) | | | | |
| Conservative win (new seat) | | | | |

=== Fairhaven ===
Fairhaven (4 seats)
| Party | Candidate | Votes | % | ±% |
|---|---|---|---|---|
| Conservative | Cartmell H. | 1,240 | 59.2 | |
| Conservative | Gouldborn J. | 1,182 | | |
| Conservative | Caldwell G. | 1,096 | | |
| Conservative | Jealous A. | 987 | | |
| Liberal | Woodhouse J. | 853 | 40.8 | |
| Turnout | | 5,358 | 49.6 | |
| Conservative win (new seat) | | | | |
| Conservative win (new seat) | | | | |
| Conservative win (new seat) | | | | |
| Conservative win (new seat) | | | | |

=== Ansdell ===
Ansdell (4 seats)
| Party | Candidate | Votes | % | ±% |
|---|---|---|---|---|
| Liberal | Woodhouse G. | 1,400 | 40.8 | |
| Conservative | Tavernor J. | 1,113 | 32.5 | |
| Conservative | Mellor J. | 1,112 | | |
| Conservative | Foster E. | 935 | | |
| Independent | Baron J. | 916 | 26.7 | |
| Conservative | Gibson M. Ms. | 832 | | |
| Turnout | | 7,308 | 81.9 | |
| Liberal win (new seat) | | | | |
| Conservative win (new seat) | | | | |
| Conservative win (new seat) | | | | |
| Conservative win (new seat) | | | | |

=== Clifton ===
Clifton (3 seats)
| Party | Candidate | Votes | % | ±% |
|---|---|---|---|---|
| Conservative | Thompson W. | 1,275 | 82.2 | |
| Conservative | Hodgson C. Ms. | 1,207 | | |
| Conservative | Shepherd J. | 1,193 | | |
| Labour | Foy E. Ms. | 277 | 17.8 | |
| Turnout | | 3,952 | 36.8 | |
| Conservative win (new seat) | | | | |
| Conservative win (new seat) | | | | |
| Conservative win (new seat) | | | | |

=== Kirkham ===
Kirkham (4 seats)
| Party | Candidate | Votes | % | ±% |
|---|---|---|---|---|
| Independent | Aiken O. | 1,282 | 49.9 | |
| Residents | Fisher R. | 1,053 | 41.0 | |
| Independent | Eadon J. | 1,019 | | |
| Independent | Hodgson B. | 1,012 | | |
| Independent | Bennett J. | 744 | | |
| Independent | Bickerstaffe W. | 624 | | |
| Independent | Hodskinson S. | 438 | | |
| Independent | Rees E. | 354 | | |
| Labour | Bott M. | 233 | 9.1 | |
| Turnout | | 6,709 | 59.0 | |
| Independent win (new seat) | | | | |
| Residents win (new seat) | | | | |
| Independent win (new seat) | | | | |
| Independent win (new seat) | | | | |

=== Ribby With Wrea ===
Ribby With Wrea (1 seat)
| Party | Candidate | Votes | % | ±% |
|---|---|---|---|---|
| Independent | Warbrick G. | 500 | 62.4 | |
| Conservative | Berry A. | 301 | 37.6 | |
| Turnout | | 801 | 75.5 | |
| Independent win (new seat) | | | | |

=== St. Johns ===
St. Johns (3 seats)
| Party | Candidate | Votes | % | ±% |
|---|---|---|---|---|
| Conservative | Lloyd B. | 1,016 | 51.8 | |
| Conservative | Bamber E. | 956 | | |
| Labour | Callon W. | 946 | 48.2 | |
| Conservative | Hardcastle C. | 899 | | |
| Labour | Rooney F. | 681 | | |
| Turnout | | 4,498 | 58.4 | |
| Conservative win (new seat) | | | | |
| Conservative win (new seat) | | | | |
| Labour win (new seat) | | | | |

=== St. Leonards ===
St. Leonards (3 seats)
| Party | Candidate | Votes | % | ±% |
|---|---|---|---|---|
| Conservative | Porter E. | 716 | 50.7 | |
| Liberal | Blackwood D. Ms. | 695 | 49.3 | |
| Conservative | Crossland J. | 631 | | |
| Conservative | Stephens J. | 555 | | |
| Turnout | | 2,597 | 40.3 | |
| Conservative win (new seat) | | | | |
| Liberal win (new seat) | | | | |
| Conservative win (new seat) | | | | |

=== Staining ===
Staining (1 seat)
| Party | Candidate | Votes | % | ±% |
|---|---|---|---|---|
| Independent | Staining C. | Unopposed | | |
| Turnout | | 0 | 0.0 | |
| Independent win (new seat) | | | | |
