= 2019 Fylde Borough Council election =

2019 UK local government election

Results by ward

Elections to Borough of Fylde were held on 2 May 2019 as part of the wider 2019 United Kingdom local elections.

== Results summary ==
The results of the 2019 elections are summarised below.

2019 Fylde Borough Council election
Party	Seats	Gains	Losses	Net gain/loss	Seats %	Votes %	Votes	+/−
Conservative	31			▼1	60.8	51.3	25,639	
Independent	17			▲3	33.3	25.0	12,483	
Lytham St. Anne's Independents	2			Steady	3.9	5.2	2,594	
Liberal Democrats	1			▼1	2.0	3.1	1,543	
Labour	0			▼1	0.0	12.2	6,096	
Green	0			Steady	0.0	3.2	1,582	

== Ward results ==
=== Ansdell ===
Ansdell (3 seats)
Party	Candidate	Votes	%	±%
Conservative	Ben Aitken	896	67.9	
Conservative	Chris Dixon	894	67.8	
Conservative	Richard Redcliffe	871	66.0	
Labour	Bob Dennett	363	27.5	
Turnout		1,372	40.4	
Conservative hold				
Conservative hold				
Conservative hold				

=== Ashton ===
Ashton (3 seats)
Party	Candidate	Votes	%	±%
Independent	Tim Armit	688	48.2	
Conservative	Gavin Harrison	508	35.6	
Conservative	William Harris	481	33.7	
Conservative	Graeme Neale	471	33.0	
Independent	Gail Goodman	403	28.3	
Liberal Democrats	Beverley Harrison	402	28.2	
Green	Bobby Black	351	24.6	
Labour	Ann Derizzio	232	16.3	
Turnout		1,442	39.3	
Independent gain from Liberal Democrats				
Conservative hold				
Conservative hold				

=== Central ===
Central (3 seats)
Party	Candidate	Votes	%	±%
Conservative	Susan Fazackerley	545	50.2	
Conservative	Edward Nash	502	46.3	
Conservative	Stanley Trudgill	488	45.0	
Labour	Ken Cridland	379	34.9	
Green	Shae Smith	349	32.2	
Labour	Justin DeRizzio-George	322	29.7	
Labour	Georgina Hodgson	315	29.0	
Turnout		1,101	32.7	
Conservative hold				
Conservative hold				
Conservative gain from Labour				

=== Clifton ===
Clifton (3 seats)
Party	Candidate	Votes	%	±%
Independent	Brenda Blackshaw	1,074	63.3	
Conservative	Peter Anthony	785	46.3	
Conservative	Ray Thomas	634	37.4	
Lytham St. Anne's Independent	Bev Love	630	37.1	
Conservative	Steve Rigby	615	36.2	
Labour	Gareth Nash	272	16.0	
Turnout		1,709	51.4	
Independent gain from Conservative				
Conservative hold				
Conservative hold				

=== Elswick and Little Eccleston ===
Elswick and Little Eccleston
Party	Candidate	Votes	%	±%
Independent	Paul Hayhurst	479	67.8	
Conservative	John Rowe	135	19.1	
Labour	Cathy Holder	92	13.0	
Majority				
Turnout		710	57.1	
Independent hold		Swing		

=== Fairhaven ===
Fairhaven (3 seats)
Party	Candidate	Votes	%	±%
Conservative	Cheryl Little	921	66.9	
Conservative	Eleanor Gaunt	785	57.0	
Conservative	Michelle Morris	756	54.9	
Green	Patricia Fielding	490	35.6	
Labour	Alan Hodgson	286	20.8	
Turnout		1,404	41.0	
Conservative hold				
Conservative hold				
Conservative hold				

=== Freckleton East ===
Freckleton East (2 seats)
Party	Candidate	Votes	%	±%
Conservative	Thomas Threlfall	455	57.2	
Independent	James Kiran Mulholland	426	53.5	
Green	Duncan Royle	156	19.6	
Labour	Meriel McGowan	140	17.6	
Conservative	Sohaib Ashraf	133	16.7	
Turnout		803	32.7	
Conservative hold				
Independent hold				

=== Freckleton West ===
Freckleton West (2 seats)
Party	Candidate	Votes	%	±%
Independent	Noreen Griffiths	565	67.3	
Conservative	Trevor Fiddler	454	54.0	
Labour	Drew Gale	183	21.8	
Conservative	Carole Morley	180	21.4	
Turnout		845	38.8	
Independent hold				
Conservative hold				

=== Heyhouses ===
Heyhouses (3 seats)
Party	Candidate	Votes	%	±%
Conservative	Vivian Willder	710	52.7	
Conservative	Sarah Nash	690	51.3	
Conservative	Vince Settle	601	44.7	
Liberal Democrats	Andrew Holland	544	40.4	
Labour	Lynn Goodwin	399	29.6	
Turnout		1,388	36.0	
Conservative hold				
Conservative hold				
Conservative hold				

=== Kilnhouse ===
Kilnhouse (3 seats)
Party	Candidate	Votes	%	±%
Liberal Democrats	Karen Henshaw	597	53.7	
Conservative	Roger Small	555	50.0	
Conservative	David O'Rourke	483	43.5	
Conservative	Elizabeth Watson	424	38.2	
Labour	Roger Duckworth	316	28.4	
Labour	Oscar Marshall	281	25.3	
Turnout		1,149	36.6	
Liberal Democrats hold				
Conservative hold				
Conservative hold				

=== Kirkham North ===
Kirkham North (3 seats)
Party	Candidate	Votes	%	±%
Independent	Elaine Silverwood	677	55.4	
Independent	Paula Brearley	607	49.7	
Independent	Paul Hodgson	467	38.2	
Conservative	Stuart Jones	313	25.6	
Conservative	Rob Small	278	22.8	
Labour	Verity Halliday	236	19.3	
Conservative	Susan Fowler	228	18.7	
Turnout		1,240	36.9	
Independent hold				
Independent hold				
Independent hold				

=== Kirkham South ===
Kirkham South (2 seats)
Party	Candidate	Votes	%	±%
Independent	Elizabeth Oades	465	73.5	
Independent	Peter Hardy	356	56.2	
Labour	Jayne Boardman	105	16.6	
Conservative	Jaroslava Sramkova	74	11.7	
Conservative	David Collins	63	10.0	
Turnout		643	30.5	
Independent hold				
Independent hold				

=== Medlar with Wesham ===
Medlar with Wesham (2 seats)
Party	Candidate	Votes	%	±%
Independent	Linda Nulty	537	58.6	
Independent	Alan Clayton	517	56.4	
Conservative	Peter Ball	248	27.1	
Labour	Dave Sheldon	194	21.2	
Conservative	Callum Jepson	182	19.9	
Turnout		918	29.8	
Independent hold				
Independent hold				

=== Newton and Treales ===
Newton and Treales (2 seats)
Party	Candidate	Votes	%	±%
Independent	Heather Speak	694	70.2	
Independent	Peter Collins	685	69.3	
Conservative	Johnny Knight	223	22.6	
Conservative	Paul Lomax	132	13.4	
Labour	Jed Sullivan	90	9.1	
Turnout		991	40.1	
Independent hold				
Independent hold				

=== Park ===
Park (3 seats)
Party	Candidate	Votes	%	±%
Independent	Brian Gill	829	49.1	
Conservative	Shirley Green	825	48.9	
Conservative	Michael Withers	771	45.7	
Independent	Neil Harvey	736	43.6	
Conservative	Sandra Pitman	672	39.8	
Labour	Tim Christian	335	19.8	
Turnout		1,708	41.7	
Independent gain from Conservative				
Conservative hold				
Conservative hold				

=== Ribby with Wrea ===
Ribby with Wrea
Party	Candidate	Votes	%	±%
Conservative	Frank Andrews	497	72.3	
Independent	Matt McIver	190	27.7	
Majority				
Turnout		691	50.3	
Conservative hold		Swing		

=== Singleton and Greenhalgh ===
Singleton and Greenhalgh
Party	Candidate	Votes	%	±%
Independent	Matthew Lee	297	65.7	
Conservative	Steve Butler	133	29.4	
Labour	Nick Ansell	22	4.9	
Majority				
Turnout		454	40.8	
Independent hold		Swing		

=== St. John's ===
St. John's (3 seats)
Party	Candidate	Votes	%	±%
Lytham St. Anne's Independent	Mark Bamforth	1,030	68.1	
Lytham St. Anne's Independent	Roger Lloyd	934	61.7	
Conservative	Michael Sayward	547	33.9	
Conservative	Deborah Wilkinson	496	30.8	
Conservative	Elizabeth Mulligan	456	28.3	
Labour	Bill Taylor	292	18.1	
Turnout		1,523	42.1	
Lytham St. Anne's Independent hold				
Lytham St. Anne's Independent hold				
Conservative hold				

=== St. Leonard's ===
St. Leonard's (3 seats)
Party	Candidate	Votes	%	±%
Conservative	Karen Buckley	681	52.1	
Conservative	Angela Jacques	613	46.9	
Conservative	Delma Collins	557	42.6	
Independent	Carol Lanyon	519	39.7	
Labour	Fred Bostock	250	19.1	
Green	Tina Rothery	236	18.1	
Labour	James Timms	232	17.8	
Labour	Viki Miller	216	16.5	
Turnout		1,321	38.0	
Conservative hold				
Conservative hold				
Conservative hold				

=== Staining and Weeton ===
Staining and Weeton (2 seats)
Party	Candidate	Votes	%	±%
Conservative	John Singleton	531	71.9	
Conservative	Jayne Nixon	488	66.0	
Labour	Fran Sullivan	217	29.4	
Turnout		759	31.2	
Conservative hold				
Conservative hold				

=== Warton and Westby ===
Warton and Westby (3 seats)
Party	Candidate	Votes	%	±%
Independent	Julie Brickles	707	50.2	
Conservative	Bobby Rigby	583	41.4	
Conservative	John Kirkham	576	40.9	
Independent	Michael Brickles	565	40.1	
Conservative	Ian Fowler	540	38.3	
Labour	Harry Virco	327	23.2	
Turnout		1,425	31.7	
Independent hold				
Conservative hold				
Conservative hold				

== Changes 2019–2023 ==
- Between January and April 2021, councillor Mark Bamforth (St. John's) left the Lytham St Anne's Independents group to sit as an independent.
- In January 2023, councillor Paula Brearley (Kirkham North) resigned; as her term would have ended in May 2023, no by-election was held. Councillor Kiran Mulholland (Freckleton East) died in early 2023; his seat also remained vacant until the 2023 election.
