= Hall Cross =

Hamlet in Lancashire, England

Coordinates: 53.765°N 2.874°W

- Shown within Fylde Borough Shown within the Fylde Location within Lancashire
- Population: 30 (est)
- OS grid reference: SD424302
- Civil parish: Freckleton
- District: Fylde
- Shire county: Lancashire
- Region: North West
- Country: England
- Sovereign state: United Kingdom
- Post town: PRESTON
- Postcode district: PR4
- Dialling code: 01772
- Police: Lancashire
- Fire: Lancashire
- Ambulance: North West
- UK Parliament: Fylde

Hall Cross is a hamlet in the Borough of Fylde in Lancashire, England, between Kirkham and Freckleton.

The name of the hamlet would seem to originate in the practice of placing of stone crosses along the roads of the Fylde. There is one of these in Hall Cross at the end of Hillock Lane. Such crosses are thought to mark resting places for funeral processions where the burial place was to be in an adjacent parish to the deceased's own.

The oldest building at Hall Cross is Hall Cross Farm, a Grade II listed building, the datestone of which bears the date of 1777.

Hall Cross is included in the parish council of Freckleton, and is part of the Fylde borough, and the Fylde constituency.

== See also ==
- Listed buildings in Lancashire
