= Hareesh Tibrewala =

Indian businessman

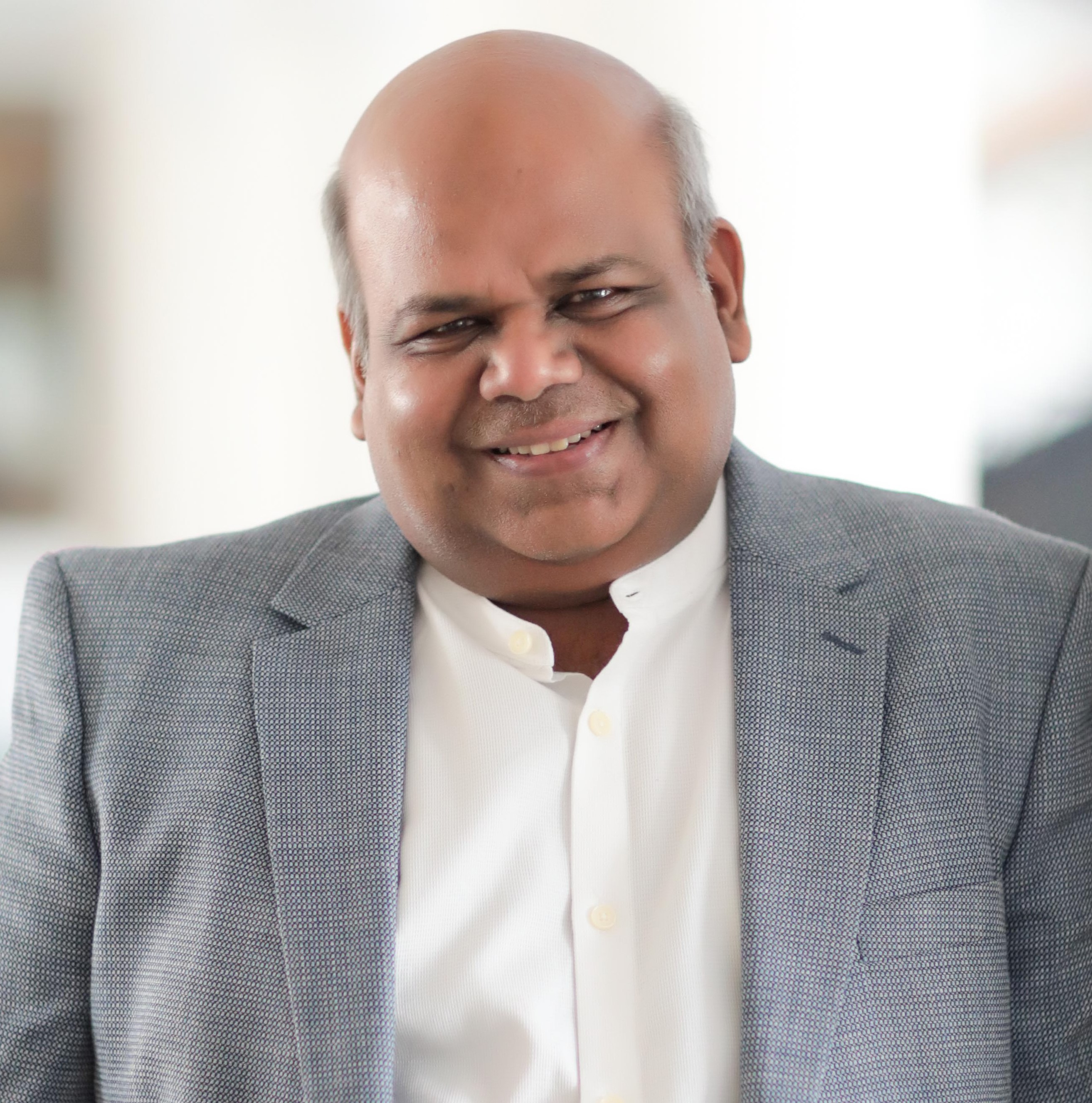
- Hareesh Tibrewala, Joint CEO Mirum India
- Born: Hareesh Tibrewala; Mukundgarh, Rajasthan, India
- Education: University of Southern California, United States
- Occupations: Businessman, entrepreneur
- Known for: Joint CEO, Mirum India

Hareesh Tibrewala is an Indian businessman and an entrepreneur. He is the joint CEO for Mirum India (a WPP Company).

He has spoken on various topics related to entrepreneurship, digital marketing and marketing automation.

He has also penned articles on how to build good website and what are web cookies, chatbots, blockchain, marketing automation, augmented reality, healthcare marketing, human resources, artificial intelligence, and virtual reality. As well as Digital Transformation, and how digital marketers are preparing for the future.

== Early life and education ==
He was born in Mukundgarh, Rajasthan, India. He studied at Hindi Vidya Bhavan and earned a bachelor's degree from VJTI, University of Mumbai and a master's degree from the University of Southern California.

== Career ==
He studied business strategy planning at AKZO-Nobel, Germany. He started his career as a partner with IFCM Counselors, a human asset management company. In 1997, he co-founded Homeindia.com. Mirum (Social Wavelength), now part of WPP plc, is Hareesh's third venture.

He was president of the Rotary Club of Mumbai, Sea Pearl, as well as the founder and co-chairperson of the expert committee on information technology at the Indian Merchants Chamber.

He is a Lead Partner with Social Venture Partners since 2023 and mentor at Standford seed.

Hareesh addressed national and international conferences on subjects pertaining to branding, entrepreneurship and technology, apart from this Hareesh has also moderated in Mirum's flagship conferences "Future of Digital Marketing".

== Books ==
- If I Had To Do It Again : Internet Entrepreneurs Wisdom In Hindsight – 2018, India, Mumbai ISBN 978-93-87860-25-4
