= 2011 Fylde Borough Council election =

2011 UK local government election

Map of the results of the 2011 Fylde council election. Conservatives in blue, Independents in grey, Liberal Democrats in yellow and Ratepayers in white.

The 2011 Fylde Borough Council election took place on 5 May 2011 to elect members of Fylde Borough Council in Lancashire, England. The whole council was up for election and the Conservative Party stayed in overall control of the council.

== Election result ==
The results saw the Conservatives keep a majority of 1 seat on the council with 26 of the 51 councillors, after suffering a net loss of 4 seats. Independents gained seats from the Conservatives in Clifton, Kirkham North and Medlar-with-Wesham wards, while also gaining seats in Freckleton East and Freckleton West after 2 sitting Conservative councillors stood as independents in the election. Overall turnout in the election was 44.6%.

Fylde local election result 2011
| Party | Seats | Gains | Losses | Net gain/loss | Seats % | Votes % | Votes | +/− |
|---|---|---|---|---|---|---|---|---|
| Conservative | 26 | 1 | 5 | -4 | 51.0 | 50.6 | 27,609 | +2.3% |
| Independent | 20 | 5 | 1 | +4 | 39.2 | 31.2 | 17,045 | +5.7% |
| Liberal Democrats | 3 | 0 | 0 | 0 | 5.9 | 9.6 | 5,268 | -3.6% |
| Fylde Ratepayers | 2 | 0 | 0 | 0 | 3.9 | 3.4 | 1,848 | -4.8% |
| Labour | 0 | 0 | 0 | 0 | 0 | 3.2 | 1,748 | -1.4% |
| Integrity UK | 0 | 0 | 0 | 0 | 0 | 1.7 | 937 | 1.7% |
| Green | 0 | 0 | 0 | 0 | 0 | 0.3 | 147 | +0.3% |

== Ward results ==
=== Ansdell ===
Ansdell (3)
| Party | Candidate | Votes | % | ±% |
|---|---|---|---|---|
| Conservative | Benjamin Aitken | 1,033 | | |
| Conservative | David Eaves | 1,002 | | |
| Conservative | Richard Redcliffe | 981 | | |
| Fylde Ratepayers | Paula Tupling-Prest | 386 | | |
| Labour | Marjorie Sherwood | 319 | | |
| Labour | Ben Singleton | 267 | | |
| Labour | Peter Stephenson | 219 | | |
| Liberal Democrats | Matthew Strutte | 181 | | |
| Turnout | | 4,388 | 46.5 | |
| Conservative hold | | Swing | | |
| Conservative hold | | Swing | | |
| Conservative hold | | Swing | | |

=== Ashton ===
Ashton (3)
| Party | Candidate | Votes | % | ±% |
|---|---|---|---|---|
| Fylde Ratepayers | John Davies | 721 | | |
| Liberal Democrats | Tony Ford | 687 | | |
| Conservative | Gail Goodman | 538 | | |
| Conservative | Barbara Nash | 497 | | |
| Independent | Peter Savic | 487 | | |
| Liberal Democrats | John Graddon | 447 | | |
| Conservative | Ellie Riley | 404 | | |
| Turnout | | 3,781 | 42.7 | |
| Independent hold | | Swing | | |
| Liberal Democrats hold | | Swing | | |
| Conservative gain from Independent | | Swing | | |

=== Central ===
Central (3)
| Party | Candidate | Votes | % | ±% |
|---|---|---|---|---|
| Conservative | Susan Fazackerley | 612 | | |
| Conservative | Edward Nash | 566 | | |
| Conservative | Fabian Craig-Wilson | 538 | | |
| Independent | John Ramsbottom | 440 | | |
| Integrity UK – Where People Matter | Bill Whitehead | 412 | | |
| Turnout | | 2,568 | 32.1 | |
| Conservative hold | | Swing | | |
| Conservative hold | | Swing | | |
| Conservative hold | | Swing | | |

=== Clifton ===
Clifton (3)
| Party | Candidate | Votes | % | ±% |
|---|---|---|---|---|
| Conservative | Len Davies | 828 | | |
| Independent | Charlie Duffy | 813 | | |
| Independent | Ken Hopwood | 804 | | |
| Conservative | Richard Fulford-Brown | 699 | | |
| Turnout | | 3,144 | | |
| Conservative hold | | Swing | | |
| Independent gain from Conservative | | Swing | | |
| Independent hold | | Swing | | |

=== Elswick and Little Eccleston ===
Elswick and Little Eccleston
| Party | Candidate | Votes | % | ±% |
|---|---|---|---|---|
| Independent | Paul Hayhurst | 589 | 83.9 | |
| Conservative | Christine Carrick | 113 | 16.1 | |
| Majority | | 476 | 67.8 | |
| Turnout | | 702 | 55.3 | |
| Independent hold | | Swing | | |

=== Fairhaven ===
Fairhaven (3)
| Party | Candidate | Votes | % | ±% |
|---|---|---|---|---|
| Conservative | Cheryl Little | 941 | | |
| Fylde Ratepayers | Richard Eastham | 741 | | |
| Conservative | David Donaldson | 702 | | |
| Conservative | Amanda Dalmasso | 692 | | |
| Liberal Democrats | Bob Fielding | 438 | | |
| Turnout | | 3,514 | 44.1 | |
| Conservative hold | | Swing | | |
| Independent hold | | Swing | | |
| Conservative hold | | Swing | | |

=== Freckleton East ===
Freckleton East (2)
| Party | Candidate | Votes | % | ±% |
|---|---|---|---|---|
| Independent | Tommy Threlfall | 707 | | |
| Independent | James Mulholland | 473 | | |
| Conservative | Cathryn Lancaster | 342 | | |
| Conservative | Faye Lamb | 159 | | |
| Turnout | | 1,681 | 41.9 | |
| Independent gain from Conservative | | Swing | | |
| Independent hold | | Swing | | |

=== Freckleton West ===
Freckleton West (2)
| Party | Candidate | Votes | % | ±% |
|---|---|---|---|---|
| Independent | Dr Fiddler | 758 | | |
| Independent | Louis Rigby | 714 | | |
| Conservative | Sophie King | 137 | | |
| Conservative | Nicholas Gleave | 120 | | |
| Turnout | | 1,729 | 45.3 | |
| Independent gain from Conservative | | Swing | | |
| Independent hold | | Swing | | |

=== Heyhouses ===
Heyhouses (3)
| Party | Candidate | Votes | % | ±% |
|---|---|---|---|---|
| Conservative | Viv Willder | 839 | | |
| Conservative | Peter Wood | 723 | | |
| Conservative | Nigel Goodrich | 681 | | |
| Liberal Democrats | Patricia Fielding | 557 | | |
| Liberal Democrats | Beverley Harrison | 488 | | |
| Turnout | | 3,288 | 40.2 | |
| Conservative hold | | Swing | | |
| Conservative hold | | Swing | | |
| Conservative hold | | Swing | | |

=== Kilnhouse ===
Kilnhouse (3)
| Party | Candidate | Votes | % | ±% |
|---|---|---|---|---|
| Liberal Democrats | Karen Henshaw | 623 | | |
| Conservative | Christine Akeroyd | 614 | | |
| Conservative | Timothy Armit | 531 | | |
| Independent | Richard Ellis | 479 | | |
| Conservative | Neil Harvey | 475 | | |
| Integrity UK – Where People Matter | Rick Whitehead | 252 | | |
| Turnout | | 2,499 | | |
| Liberal Democrats hold | | Swing | | |
| Conservative hold | | Swing | | |
| Conservative hold | | Swing | | |

=== Kirkham North ===
Kirkham North (3)
| Party | Candidate | Votes | % | ±% |
|---|---|---|---|---|
| Independent | Elaine Silverwood | 1,007 | | |
| Independent | Keith Beckett | 880 | | |
| Independent | Paul Hodgson | 668 | | |
| Conservative | Ted Rhodes | 469 | | |
| Conservative | William Oldfield | 396 | | |
| Conservative | Michael Hill | 204 | | |
| Turnout | | 3,624 | 47.7 | |
| Independent hold | | Swing | | |
| Independent hold | | Swing | | |
| Independent gain from Conservative | | Swing | | |

=== Kirkham South ===
Kirkham South (2)
| Party | Candidate | Votes | % | ±% |
|---|---|---|---|---|
| Independent | Liz Oades | 698 | | |
| Independent | Peter Hardy | 400 | | |
| Conservative | Barry Mitchell | 152 | | |
| Conservative | Sarah Carrick | 151 | | |
| Labour | Dennis Davenport | 148 | | |
| Turnout | | 1,549 | 41.7 | |
| Independent hold | | Swing | | |
| Independent hold | | Swing | | |

=== Medlar-with-Wesham ===
Medlar-with-Wesham (2)
| Party | Candidate | Votes | % | ±% |
|---|---|---|---|---|
| Independent | Linda Nulty | 651 | | |
| Independent | Alan Clayton | 591 | | |
| Conservative | Martin Howarth | 311 | | |
| Conservative | Stuart Jones | 209 | | |
| Integriy UK | Peter Ball | 97 | | |
| Turnout | | 1,859 | 37.8 | |
| Independent hold | | Swing | | |
| Independent gain from Conservative | | Swing | | |

=== Newton and Treales ===
Newton and Treales (2)
| Party | Candidate | Votes | % | ±% |
|---|---|---|---|---|
| Independent | Heather Speak | 837 | | |
| Independent | Peter Collins | 675 | | |
| Conservative | Colin Mackintosh | 326 | | |
| Conservative | Stephen Butler | 324 | | |
| Liberal Democrats | Pam Winlow | 140 | | |
| Turnout | | 2,302 | 50.1 | |
| Independent hold | | Swing | | |
| Independent hold | | Swing | | |

=== Park ===
Park (3)
| Party | Candidate | Votes | % | ±% |
|---|---|---|---|---|
| Conservative | Simon Cox | 1,085 | | |
| Independent | David Chedd | 1,052 | | |
| Conservative | Dawn Prestwich | 977 | | |
| Conservative | Matthew Lardner | 962 | | |
| Turnout | | 4,076 | 48.5 | |
| Conservative hold | | Swing | | |
| Independent hold | | Swing | | |
| Conservative hold | | Swing | | |

=== Ribby-with-Wrea ===
Ribby-with-Wrea
| Party | Candidate | Votes | % | ±% |
|---|---|---|---|---|
| Conservative | Frank Andrews | 374 | 53.6 | |
| Independent | Janet Wardell | 324 | 46.4 | |
| Majority | | 50 | 7.2 | |
| Turnout | | 698 | 59.8 | |
| Conservative hold | | Swing | | |

=== Sinleton and Greenhalgh ===
Singleton and Greenhalgh
| Party | Candidate | Votes | % | ±% |
|---|---|---|---|---|
| Independent | Maxine Chew | 369 | 70.2 | |
| Conservative | Elizabeth Clarkson | 106 | 20.2 | |
| Green | Ian Roberts | 51 | 9.7 | |
| Majority | | 263 | 50.0 | |
| Turnout | | 526 | 46.5 | |
| Independent hold | | Swing | | |

=== St John's ===
St John's (3)
| Party | Candidate | Votes | % | ±% |
|---|---|---|---|---|
| Conservative | Brenda Ackers | 771 | | |
| Conservative | Tim Ashton | 717 | | |
| Independent | Kath Harper | 704 | | |
| Conservative | Michael Cornah | 672 | | |
| Liberal Democrats | Carol Gilligan | 424 | | |
| Turnout | | 3,288 | 43.3 | |
| Conservative hold | | Swing | | |
| Conservative hold | | Swing | | |
| Independent hold | | Swing | | |

=== St Leonard's ===
St Leonard's (3)
| Party | Candidate | Votes | % | ±% |
|---|---|---|---|---|
| Liberal Democrats | Howard Henshaw | 815 | | |
| Conservative | Karen Buckley | 547 | | |
| Conservative | Angela Jacques | 477 | | |
| Liberal Democrats | Carol Lanyon | 468 | | |
| Conservative | Martin Chatfield | 402 | | |
| Independent | Des Downey | 318 | | |
| Labour | Fred Bostock | 293 | | |
| Labour | Bill Taylor | 260 | | |
| Integrity UK | Carolyn Astin | 176 | | |
| Turnout | | 3,756 | | |
| Liberal Democrats hold | | Swing | | |
| Conservative hold | | Swing | | |
| Conservative hold | | Swing | | |

=== Staining and Weeton ===
Staining and Weeton (2)
| Party | Candidate | Votes | % | ±% |
|---|---|---|---|---|
| Conservative | John Singleton | 582 | | |
| Conservative | Albert Pounder | 475 | | |
| Independent | Stephen Hall | 355 | | |
| Labour | Nick Ansell | 242 | | |
| Green | Stacey Houldsworth | 96 | | |
| Turnout | | 1,750 | 43.0 | |
| Conservative hold | | Swing | | |
| Conservative hold | | Swing | | |

=== Warton and Westby ===
Warton and Westby (3)
| Party | Candidate | Votes | % | ±% |
|---|---|---|---|---|
| Conservative | Susan Ashton | 775 | | |
| Independent | Julie Brickles | 725 | | |
| Conservative | Susanne Cunningham | 700 | | |
| Conservative | Barbara Douglas | 678 | | |
| Independent | Michael Gilbert | 527 | | |
| Turnout | | 3,405 | 42.2 | |
| Conservative hold | | Swing | | |
| Independent hold | | Swing | | |
| Conservative hold | | Swing | | |
