= Halabezack =

Hamlet in Cornwall, England

Coordinates: 50.168°N 5.219°W

- Location within Cornwall
- OS grid reference: SW702348
- Civil parish: Wendron
- Shire county: Cornwall
- Region: South West
- Country: England
- Sovereign state: United Kingdom
- Post town: HELSTON
- Postcode district: TR13
- Dialling code: 01326
- Police: Devon and Cornwall
- Fire: Cornwall
- Ambulance: South Western
- UK Parliament: Camborne and Redruth

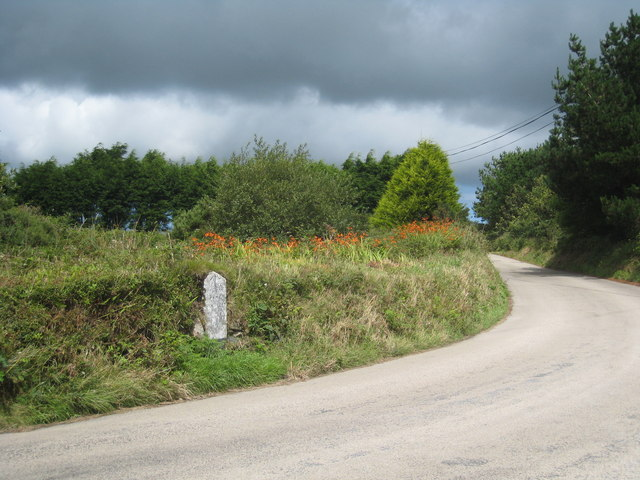
A milestone at Halabezack

Halabezack is a hamlet that lies 5 miles (8.0 km) west of Penryn in Cornwall, England.

Halabezack is in the civil parish of Wendron (where the 2011 census population was included ) and is 2.5 miles (4.0 km) north-east of the village of Wendron; Halabezack is situated in the Cornwall and West Devon Mining Landscape which was designated as a World Heritage Site in 2006.
