= Den Ham (disambiguation) =

Den Ham is a village in Overijssel, Netherlands

Den Ham may also refer to:

- Den Ham, Westerkwartier, a village in Groningen, Netherlands
- Den Ham, Bellingwedde, a hamlet in Groningen, Netherlands
