= 1999 Fylde Borough Council election =

1999 UK local government election

The 1999 Fylde Borough Council election took place on 6 May 1999 to elect members of Fylde District Council in Lancashire, England. The whole council was up for election and the council stayed under no overall control.

== Election result ==
Fylde local election result 1999
Party	Seats	Gains	Losses	Net gain/loss	Seats %	Votes %	Votes	+/−
Conservative	21			+3	42.9			
Independent	12			0	24.5			
Ratepayers	11			+1	22.4			
Liberal Democrats	3			-1	6.1			
Labour	2			-3	4.1			
