= Halamanning =

Hamlet in Cornwall, England

Coordinates: 50.127°N 5.418°W

Halamanning: Cornish: Halamanyn
- Location within Cornwall
- OS grid reference: SW558309
- Unitary authority: Cornwall
- Ceremonial county: Cornwall
- Region: South West
- Country: England
- Sovereign state: United Kingdom
- Post town: PENZANCE
- Postcode district: TR20
- Dialling code: 01736
- Police: Devon and Cornwall
- Fire: Cornwall
- Ambulance: South Western
- UK Parliament: St Ives

Halamanning (Cornish: Halamanyn) is a hamlet in west Cornwall, England, situated approximately 5.5 miles (8.9 km) east of Penzance and 4 miles (6.4 km) south of Hayle. Halamanning is in the parish of St Hilary (where the population taken at the 2011 census was included) and is in the Cornwall and West Devon Mining Landscape, which was designated as a World Heritage Site in 2006.

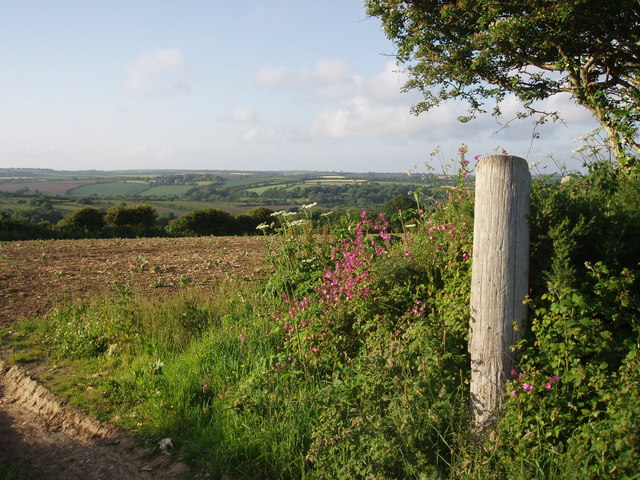
Fields near Halamanning
