= Hacklinge =

Village in Kent, England

Coordinates: 51.235°N 1.36°E

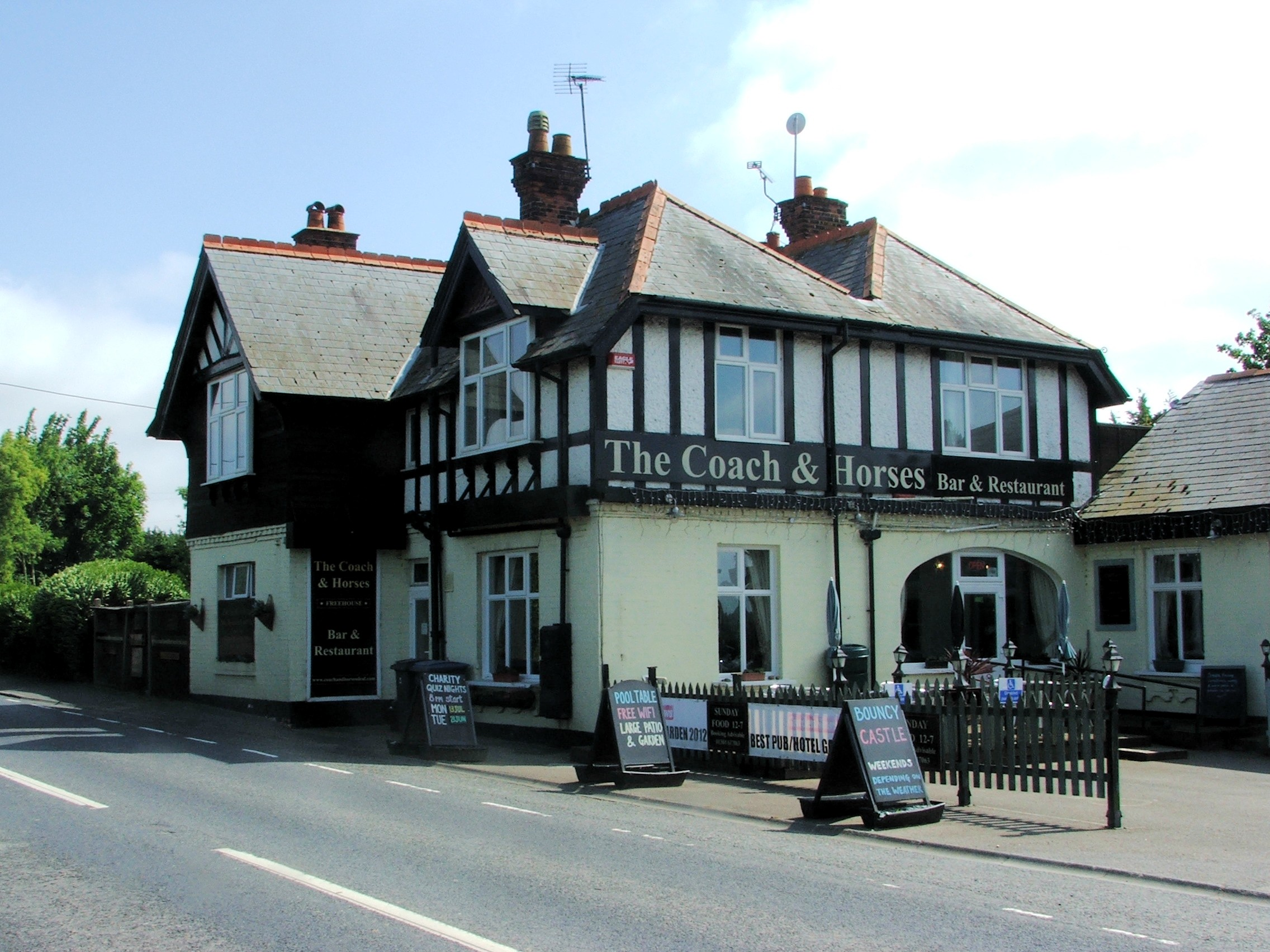
- The Coach & Horses pub

- Location within Kent
- OS grid reference: TR3454
- District: Dover
- Shire county: Kent
- Region: South East
- Country: England
- Sovereign state: United Kingdom
- Post town: Deal
- Postcode district: CT14
- Police: Kent
- Fire: Kent
- Ambulance: South East Coast

Hacklinge is a village near Deal in Kent, England. The population of the village is included in the civil parish of Northbourne. It lies next to the A258 about halfway between Sandwich and Deal. The most notable features are the Coach and Horses Inn next to the main road, and the Martha Trust home further towards Sandwich.

Close to Hacklinge across the flood plain lies a deserted homestead known as Spruckelham. Spruckelham is cited as being 'lineally to the east' of Hacklinge in a deed from the 14th century. It is thought to have been situated close to the present Chequers Inn in the Sandhills on the old track from Deal to Sandwich. The Lookers House that perished in the early part of the 20th century may well have been a part of the settlement of Spruckelham. Excavations at the site of the Lookers House in the 1980s revealed continuous occupation from the 14th century.
