= Halgabron =

Coordinates: 50.665°N 4.731°W

Halgabron: Cornish: Halgibran
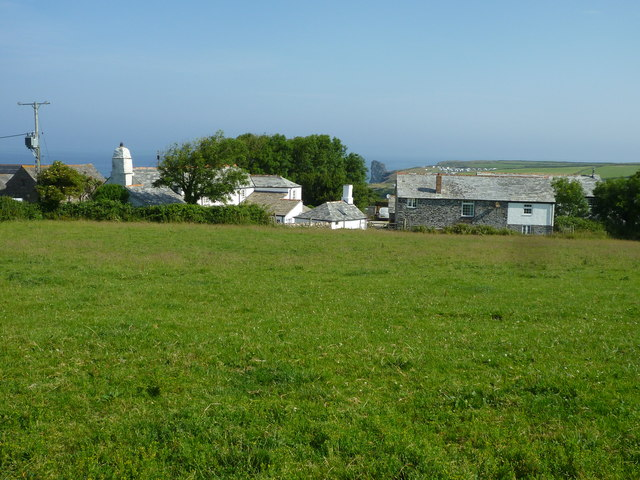

- Location within Cornwall
- OS grid reference: SX071886
- Civil parish: Tintagel
- Unitary authority: Cornwall
- Ceremonial county: Cornwall
- Region: South West
- Country: England
- Sovereign state: United Kingdom
- Post town: Bodmin
- Postcode district: PL30

Halgabron (Cornish: Halgibran) is a hamlet in the parish of Tintagel, Cornwall, England. Halgabron is east of Bossiney. The family of Robartes once held land at Halgabron. Halgabron mill was built on the Trevillet River in the 19th century.
