= Halvosso =

Hamlet in Cornwall, England

Coordinates: 50°08′25″N 5°09′41″W

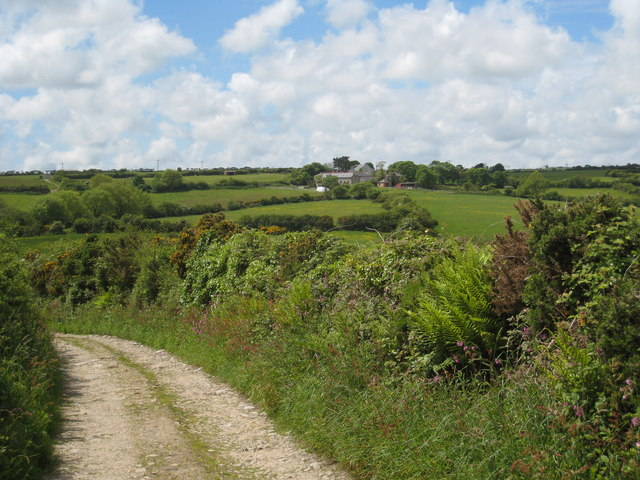
View towards Halvosso from track to Higher Spargo quarry

Halvosso is a hamlet in the civil parish of Mabe in west Cornwall, England, UK. It is in the civil parish of Constantine.
