= Hallew =

Hamlet in Cornwall, England

Coordinates: 50.402°N 4.796°W

- Location within Cornwall
- OS grid reference: SX014595
- Civil parish: Treverbyn
- Unitary authority: Cornwall
- Ceremonial county: Cornwall
- Region: South West
- Country: England
- Sovereign state: United Kingdom
- Post town: St Austell
- Postcode district: PL26

Hallew is a hamlet in the parish of Treverbyn (where the 2011 census population was included), Cornwall, England.
