= Herman van Ham =

Dutch head chef (1931–2012)

- Born: 16 April 1931; Nijehaske, The Netherlands
- Died: 2 August 2012 (aged 81); Wellerlooi, The Netherlands
- Occupation: Chef
- Employer: Hostellerie De Hamert
- Known for: Michelin star
- Successor: Bertus Liefting
- Partner: Riek Schoester
- Children: 1 son, 3 daughters

Herman van Ham (16 April 1931 – 2 August 2012) was a Dutch head chef. He worked in the Michelin starred Hostellerie De Hamert, in Wellerlooi, the Netherlands, when it earned his stars in the period 1963-1989.

In 1952, Van Ham started working at De Hamert as an assistant. Soon after that he took over as head chef and stayed till his retirement in 1988.

Herman van Ham specialized in asparagus to such an extent that he had several nicknames related to this. He was named as De Ongekroonde Koning van de Asperge (Eng.:The uncrowned king of Asparagus), Asperge Paus (Eng.:Asparagus Pope) and Mister Asperge (Eng.: Mister Asparagus). One of his famous asparagus dishes was the "Cocktail Prins Alexander", a combination of chicken, asparagus and oranges, created in 1967 in celebration of the birth of Willem-Alexander, Prince of Orange.

After his retirement, Van Ham started collecting asparagus dishes. His collection went on display in Keramiekcentrum Tiendschuur Tegelen in 2012 under the name "Het keramische bedje voor de asperge." (Eng.: The ceramic bed for the asparagus.) Earlier, in 2008, his collection was on display in Aspergemuseum De Locht

Herman van Ham died on 2 August 2012, after an illness.

== Awards ==
- Michelin star 1963–1988
- Prix d'Escoffier de l'Alliance Gastronomique Néerlandaise/Alliance-Escoffier Prijs: 1988
- Chevalier de Confrérie de l'asperge de Limbourgondie
- Eremedaille in goud Oranje Nassau
- Chevalier de Chaîne des Rôtisseurs.

== Books ==
- Het aspergesboek : heerlijke gerechten met de koningin der groenten; Wiel Basten and Herman van Ham, M & P, 1989
- Het aspergeboek; Herman van Ham and Wiel Basten, Van Dishoeck, 2005
- Het aspergekookboek; Herman van Ham and Wiel Basten, Van Reemst, 1998
