= Ham Lake (Hubbard County, Minnesota) =

Lake in the state of Minnesota, United States

- Location within Minnesota
- Location: Hubbard County, Minnesota
- Coordinates: 46°55′50″N 94°46′29″W
- Type: lake

Ham Lake is a lake in Hubbard County, in the U.S. state of Minnesota.

Ham Lake was so named on account of its outline being shaped like a ham.

== See also ==
- List of lakes in Minnesota
