= Ham Avery =

American lawyer, baseball player, and umpire

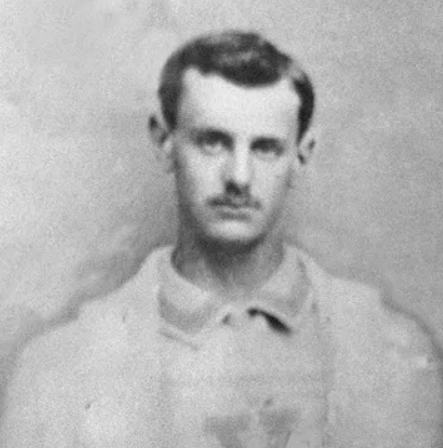
- Ham Avery, Yale 1874
- Born: Charles Hammond Avery; April 8, 1854; Cincinnati, Ohio, U.S.
- Died: January 3, 1927 (aged 72); Clearwater, Florida, U.S.
- Occupation: Umpire
- Years active: 1874–1875
- Employer: National Association

Charles Hammond Avery (April 8, 1854 – January 3, 1927) was an American lawyer, in his youth a college baseball pitcher, and a professional baseball umpire.

Avery, son of Charles L'Hommedieu Avery and Martha (Bakewell) Avery, was a prep school student in Cincinnati in 1870; the next year he enrolled at Yale, where he joined the baseball team in the spring of his sophomore year in 1873. He was called (by Frank Blair) "the first man to pitch a curve-ball game", using the new pitch with success against Harvard. When he graduated in 1875, he was offered the very large salary of $3,400 by Harry Wright to pitch for the Boston Red Stockings, an offer matched by the Hartford Dark Blues, but "Avery, a Skull & Bones Society blueblood, thought professional baseball beneath him, and demurred." He went on to study at the Cincinnati Law School and in the office of Judge Alphonso Taft and was admitted to the Cincinnati bar in 1878, where he had a successful legal practice, representing "various well-known corporations." He married Nettie Barker in 1882; she died the following year, and in 1890 he married Alice Aiken, with whom he had a daughter and a son.

Avery umpired 9 total National Association games in 1874 and 1875. all of them as the home plate umpire.
