= Human asset management =

Practice of managing people as assets

Human asset management (HAM) is the practice of managing people, usually within an organisation, as assets (or human capital). It can be seen as an alternative to human resource management treating people as an enduring asset rather than a resource to be consumed. Human asset management can include the functions of recruitment, onboarding, retention, development, culture, career management, mobility, succession planning, talent management, performance management, employee administration and legal issues.

== Definition ==
Human asset management covers several interrelated and to some degree overlapping concepts, that individually and in combination affect competitiveness and performance. This includes competency profiling, development planning, talent asset management, strategic workforce planning, performance management, recruitment and on-boarding. Short-term and long-term corporate performance may be positively influenced when individual and overall competencies match requirements to execute the strategies.

== History ==
=== Developments ===
Human asset management is an evolution from the old terms like human resource management and human capital management. Many organization defined people as ‘resources’. In HAM, employees are not regarded or managed as a ‘disposable resource’. The importance of relating with an employer was highlighted by Quelch and Jocz. The first discussion of the concept can be traced back to 2001, when Andrew Mayo raised the idea that: The concepts of human assets and human capital are complementary. It is the intrinsic worth of our people that comprise the human capital available to us, and at the same time that worth is a value-creating asset

=== Use in business schools ===
After Andrew Mayo Human Asset Management as a term was first documented and used towards a wider audience by Sandeep Sander, CEO, SanderMap, in a presentation at the Human Resources Management Forum in Genoa, Italy, in October 2002. It was also in the same period part of video dialogue between Professor John Quelch, then Dean at London Business School, now Professor at Harvard Business School and Sandeep Sander.

Professor Andrew Mayo states in ‘The human value of the enterprise’ that “Every person is an individual, not just another ‘head’. They bring a different level of present and potential value to their current role and their organization”. This point of view was further emphasized by Prahalad and Ramaswamy (2004, p138), when they state that “…core competencies are unique skills that transcend individual business units, are deeply embedded in the organization, are hard for competitors to imitate, and are seen by customers as creating value”.
