= Borough of Fylde =

Coordinates: 53.763°N 2.934°W

- Borough and non-metropolitan district
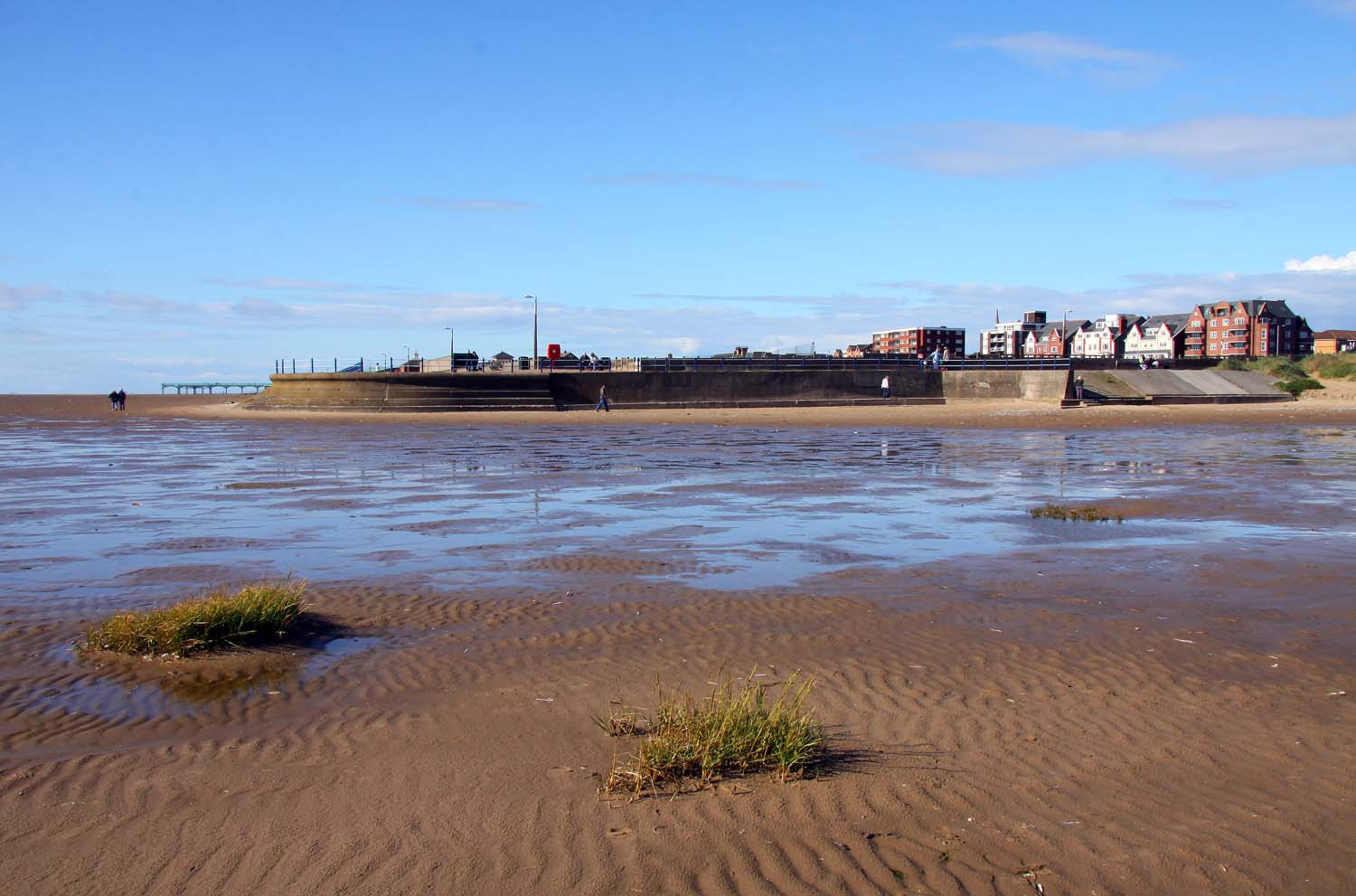
- Lytham St Annes beach

- Shown within Lancashire and England
- Sovereign state: United Kingdom
- Constituent country: England
- Region: North West England
- Ceremonial county: Lancashire
- Founded: 1 April 1974
- Admin. HQ: Lytham St Annes

Government
  - Type: Fylde Borough Council
  - MPs: Andrew Snowden

Area
  - Total: 64 sq mi (166 km^{2})
  - Rank: 157th

Population (2024)
  - Total: 85,447
  - Rank: 275th
  - Density: 1,330/sq mi (515/km^{2})

Ethnicity (2021)
  - Ethnic groups: List: 96.3% White; 1.4% Asian; 1.4% Mixed; 0.5% other; 0.4% Black

Religion (2021)
  - Religion: List: 61.6% Christianity; 31.2% no religion; 5% not stated; 0.7% Islam; 0.4% other; 0.4% Judaism; 0.3% Buddhism; 0.3% Hinduism; 0.1% Sikhism
- Time zone: UTC+0 (Greenwich Mean Time)
  - Summer (DST): UTC+1 (British Summer Time)
- ONS code: 30UF (ONS); E07000119 (GSS)

The Borough of Fylde is a local government district with borough status in Lancashire, England. It covers part of the Fylde plain, after which it is named. The council's headquarters are in St Annes. The borough also contains the towns of Kirkham, Lytham and Wesham and surrounding villages and rural areas.

The neighbouring districts are Blackpool, Wyre, Preston, South Ribble and West Lancashire.

== History ==
The district was created on 1 April 1974 under the Local Government Act 1972, covering the area of three former districts, which were all abolished at the same time:

- Fylde Rural District
- Kirkham Urban District
- Lytham St Annes Municipal Borough

The district was named Fylde after the coastal plan. It was awarded borough status from its creation, allowing the chair of the council to take the title of mayor.

The coat of arms of the borough bear the motto of the former Fylde Rural District Council, "Gaudeat Ager" from Psalm 96: 'Let the field (Fylde) be joyful' - "Let Fylde Prosper". The armorial bearings comprise a complete Achievement of Arms, that is - shield, crest and helm and mantling, supporters, badge and motto. They reflect the union of the three local authorities in the area: Lytham St Annes Borough Council, Kirkham Urban District Council and Fylde Rural District Council.

Under current local government reorganisation plans, all district councils in Lancashire, as well as the county council, will be abolished in 2028, with the district combining with the existing Blackpool unitary and the adjacent borough of Wyre to form a new Fylde Coast unitary authority.

== Governance ==
Fylde Council

Type
- Type: Non-metropolitan district

History
- Founded: 1 April 1974

Leadership
- Mayor: Richard Redcliffe, Conservative since 13 May 2026
- Leader: Karen Buckley, Conservative since 20 July 2020
- Chief Executive: Allan Oldfield since January 2012

Structure
- Seats: 37 councillors
- Graph of the party split among 37 seats.
- Political groups: Administration (22) Conservative (22) Other parties (15) Labour (2) Liberal Democrats (2) Independent (11)

Elections
- Voting system: First past the post
- Last election: 4 May 2023
- Next election: 6 May 2027

Meeting place
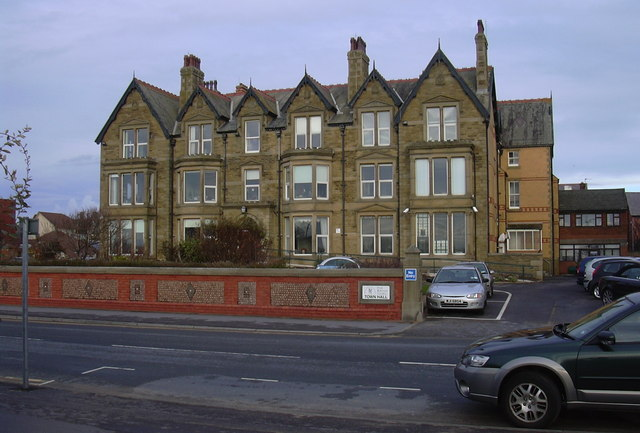
- Town Hall, South Promenade, Lytham St Annes, FY8 1LW

Website
- new.fylde.gov.uk

Fylde Borough Council, which styles itself "Fylde Council", provides district-level services. County-level services are provided by Lancashire County Council. Most of the borough is also covered by civil parishes, which form a third tier of local government.

=== Political control ===
The council has been under Conservative majority control since 2003.

The first election to the council was held in 1973, initially operating as a shadow authority alongside the outgoing authorities before coming into its powers on 1 April 1974. Political control of the council since 1974 has been as follows:

Party in control	Years
Conservative	1974–1991
No overall control	1991–2003
Conservative	2003–present

=== Leadership ===
The role of mayor is largely ceremonial in Fylde. Political leadership is instead provided by the leader of the council. The leaders since 2010 have been:

Councillor	Party	From	To
David Eaves	Conservative	2010	Oct 2014
Sue Fazackerley	Conservative	1 Dec 2014	Apr 2020
Karen Buckley	Conservative	20 Jul 2020	

=== Composition ===
Following the 2023 election, and subsequent by-elections and changes of allegiance up to May 2026, the composition of the council was:

Party	Seats
Conservative	22
Labour	2
Liberal Democrats	2
Independent	11
Total	37

Of the independent councillors, eight sit together as a group, and the other three are not aligned to any group. The next election is due in 2027.

=== Elections ===
Since the last boundary changes in 2023 the council has comprised 37 councillors, representing 17 wards, with each ward electing one, two or three councillors. Elections are held every four years.

UK Youth Parliament

Although the UK Youth Parliament is an apolitical organisation, the elections are run in a way similar to that of the Local Elections. The votes come from 11 to 18-year olds and are combined to make the decision of the next, 2-year Member of Youth Parliament. The elections are run at different times across the country with Fylde's typically being in early Spring and bi-annually.

=== Premises ===
The council is based at Lytham St Annes Town Hall on South Promenade in St Annes. The building was originally a hotel called Southdown Hydro, but was bought in 1925 to serve as a town hall following the merger of the districts of St Annes and Lytham in 1922 to become Lytham St Annes.

Some council departments, including the planning department and an office of the Registrar, were previously located at the former Fylde Rural District Council offices on Derby Road in Wesham, but in 2007 the council vacated this office. It was then used by the NHS North Lancashire Primary Care Trust until around 2013. The building has since been demolished and replaced by a new housing development.

== Settlements ==
Towns and villages in the Borough of Fylde (inset: in Lancashire)

=== Civil parishes ===
Parishes in Fylde Borough

There are 15 civil parishes in Fylde. The parish councils of Kirkham, Medlar-with-Wesham and St Annes-on-the-Sea have declared their parishes to be towns, allowing them to take the style "town council".

1. Bryning-with-Warton
2. Elswick
3. Freckleton
4. Greenhalgh-with-Thistleton
5. Kirkham
6. Little Eccleston-with-Larbreck
7. Medlar-with-Wesham
8. Newton-with-Clifton
9. Ribby-with-Wrea
10. St Annes-on-the-Sea
11. Singleton
12. Staining
13. Treales, Roseacre and Wharles
14. Weeton-with-Preese
15. Westby-with-Plumptons

Lytham is unparished.
