= List of AFC Fylde seasons =

The table below is a list of AFC Fylde seasons from the formation of the club in 1988 to the most recent completed season. The list details the club's achievements in all first-team competitions and records their top league goalscorer and average home league attendance, where known.

Based in Wesham in the Borough of Fylde, Lancashire, they were originally named Kirkham & Wesham as a result of a merger between Kirkham Town F.C. and Wesham F.C. The club assumed Kirkham Town's place in Division One of the West Lancashire League for the 1988–89 season. The following season they finished bottom of the league table and were relegated to Division Two.

In 1993 they were promoted back into Division One but were relegated again after a two-season spell. The club finished as runners-up in 1996 to achieve promotion after one season. Kirkham & Wesham's third spell in Division One, which was renamed Premier Division in 1998, was successful as they spent 11 seasons in the division, winning the title seven times, including the 2007 title where they were allowed to be promoted into the North West Counties Football League (NWC) in their Division Two for the 2007–08 season.

The club finished as runners-up in the division and achieved promotion to the Premier Division. During this season the club entered the FA Vase for the first time and won the competition, defeating Lowestoft Town 2–1 in the final at Wembley Stadium. At the end of the season the club adopted the new name AFC Fylde.

In 2009 Fylde achieved their third successive promotion by winning the North West Counties Premier Division title, they were promoted into the Northern Premier League Division One North. Fylde were unable to successfully defend the FA Vase losing 2–1 in the fourth round to Needham Market. The club were entered into the FA Cup qualifying rounds for the first time in the 2008–09 season, losing to Sheffield in the preliminary round. The 2009–10 season saw the club play in the FA Trophy for the first time and the 2010–11 season they were runners-up in the promotion play-offs. Their third season in Division One North saw them win the championship title and were promoted into the Premier Division.

The club spent two seasons in the Premier Division qualifying for the play-offs in both; in the first season play-offs they were eliminated in the semi-finals by Hednesford Town in a penalty shoot-out; in the second they defeated Worksop Town in the semi-final and Ashton United in the final on penalties to achieve promotion to the Conference North.

In their first season in the Conference North they finished as runners-up in the league only two points behind champions Barrow and automatic promotion, in the play-offs they were eliminated by Guiseley in the two-legged semi-final 3–1 on aggregate. The following season the Conference North was renamed National League North. The club's third-place finish meant they qualified for their fourth consecutive play-offs, they reached the final but were runners-up to North Ferriby United. Fylde won the 2016–17 National League North title and were promoted in the National League, the highest level of the National League System and fifth-highest of the overall English football league system.

Fylde finished in seventh-place in their first National League season and qualified for their sixth play-offs tournament, this time losing to Boreham Wood in the quarter-final. In the 2018–19 season they finished in fifth-place and once again qualified for the play-offs, beating Harrogate Town in the quarter-final and Solihull Moors in the semi-final before losing to Salford City in the final. Also during this season the club reached the 2019 FA Trophy Final, their first FA Trophy final, where they played National League champions Leyton Orient and defeated them 1–0 to win the competition.

== Key ==
Key to divisions

Conf N	Conference North
Nat	National League
Nat N	National League North
NPL; D1N	Northern Premier League Division One North
NPL; Prem	Northern Premier League Premier Division
NWC; D2	North West Counties League Division Two
NWC; Prem	North West Counties League Premier Division
WL D1	West Lancashire League Division One
WL D2	West Lancashire League Division Two
WL; Prem	West Lancashire League Premier Division

Key to league position
colour codes and symbols

1st	League champions but no promotion gained
(↑)	Promoted as champions
(↑)	Promoted
	Lost in play-offs
(↓)	Relegated

Key to cup colour codes
and rounds

W	Winners
F	Finalists / runners-up
SF	Semi-finals
QF	Quarter-finals
R1	First round, etc.
1Q	First round qualifying, etc.
PR	Preliminary round

== Seasons ==
Season	League											Cup				Top goalscorer (Note: Goals in all competitions are counted. Data prior to 2014 is unavailable.)		Avg. att. (Note: Average attendance taken from league matches only. Data prior to 2012 is unavailable.)
Season	∆	Division	P	W	D	L	F	A	Pts	Pos	PO	FAC	Lge	FAT	FAV	Player	Gls	Avg. att.
1988–89	10	WL D1	32	12	4	16	51	56	40	11th	—	—	—	—	—	—	—	—
1989–90	10	WL D1	34	6	3	25	3	75	21	18th (↓)	—	—	—	—	—	—	—	—
1990–91	11	WL D2	38	14	7	17	51	70	49	15th	—	—	—	—	—	—	—	—
1991–92	11	WL D2	34	13	9	12	61	67	48	10th	—	—	—	—	—	—	—	—
1992–93	11	WL D2	34	16	12	6	56	38	60	3rd (↑)	—	—	—	—	—	—	—	—
1993–94	10	WL D1	34	13	7	14	46	60	46	13th	—	—	—	—	—	—	—	—
1994–95	10	WL D1	34	7	6	21	33	79	27	16th (↓)	—	—	—	—	—	—	—	—
1995–96	11	WL D2	34	23	9	2	75	22	78	2nd (↑)	—	—	—	—	—	—	—	—
1996–97	10	WL D1	34	9	9	16	40	61	36	14th	—	—	—	—	—	—	—	—
1997–98	10	WL D1	34	20	6	8	65	44	63 (Note: Kirkham & Wesham were deducted three points.)	4th	—	—	—	—	—	—	—	—
1998–99	10	WL Prem (Note: West Lancashire Division One was renamed Premier Division after league re-organisation.)	30	20	5	5	8	33	62	4th	—	—	—	—	—	—	—	—
1999–2000	10	WL Prem	30	24	3	3	98	22	75	1st	—	—	—	—	—	—	—	—
2000–01	10	WL Prem	28	22	5	1	90	24	71	1st	—	—	—	—	—	—	—	—
2001–02	10	WL Prem	30	22	6	2	90	20	72	1st	—	—	—	—	—	—	—	—
2002–03	10	WL Prem	30	20	2	8	87	43	62	2nd	—	—	—	—	—	—	—	—
2003–04	10	WL Prem	30	25	5	0	87	26	80	1st	—	—	—	—	—	—	—	—
2004–05	11 (Note: Following the re-organisation of the National League with the introduction of North and South divisions at step two, the West Lancashire Premier was downgraded to level 11 of the English football league pyramid.)	WL Prem	30	25	3	2	94	17	78	1st	—	—	—	—	—	—	—	—
2005–06	11	WL Prem	30	25	5	0	96	19	80	1st	—	—	—	—	—	—	—	—
2006–07	11	WL Prem	30	22	6	2	62	19	72	1st (↑)	—	—	—	—	—	—	—	—
2007–08	10	NWC D2	34	24	5	5	88	31	77	2nd (↑)	—	—	W (Note: Kirkham & Wesham won the North West Counties Football League Second Division Trophy final.)	—	W (Note: Kirkham & Wesham beat Lowestoft Town 2–1 in the FA Vase final at Wembley Stadium.)	—	—	—
2008–09	9	NWC Prem	42	33	5	4	122	35	104	1st (↑)	—	PR	(Note: AFC Fylde competed in the North West Counties Football League Challenge Cup but performance data is not available.)	—	R4	—	—	—
2009–10	8	NPL D1N	42	15	8	19	67	79	53	13th	—	2Q	(Note: AFC Fylde competed in the Northern Premier League Challenge Cup but performance data is not available.)	3Q	—	—	—	—
2010–11	8	NPL D1N	44	24	9	11	91	59	81	5th	F (Note: Beat Skelmersdale United 1–0 in the semi-final before losing 2–0 to Chorley in the Northern Premier League Division One North play-off Final.)	PR	R1	PR	—	—	—	—
2011–12	8	NPL D1N	42	31	6	5	90	29	99	1st (↑)	—	2Q	R1	1Q	—	—	—	—
2012–13	7	NPL Prem	42	23	6	13	93	51	75	5th	SF (Note: Lost in the play-off semi-final to Hednesford Town 3–1 in a penalty shoot-out after the match ended 3–3.)	R1	R3	3Q	—	—	—	347
2013–14	7	NPL Prem	46	28	9	9	97	41	93	3rd (↑)	W (Note: Promoted to Conference North via the play-offs, beating Worksop Town 3–1 in the semi-final and Ashton United in a 4–3 penalty shoot-out in the Northern Premier League Premier Division play-off Final after the match had ended 1–1.)	2Q	W (Note: Beat Skelmersdale United 1–0 in the Northern Premier League Challenge Cup final at Edgeley Park.)	3Q	—	—	—	311
2014–15	6	Conf N	42	25	10	7	93	43	85	2nd	SF (Note: Lost in the play-off semi-final to Guiseley 3–1 on aggregate.)	R1	—	R3	—	Danny Rowe	30	493
2015–16	6	Nat N (Note: The Football Conference was renamed the National League, with the North and South divisions also renamed National League North and National League South respectively.)	42	22	9	11	76	53	75	3rd	F (Note: Beat Harrogate Town 2–1 on aggregate in the semi-final before losing 2–1 to North Ferriby United in the National League North play-off Final.)	R1	—	R3	—	Danny Rowe	36	521
2016–17	6	Nat N	42	26	10	6	109	60	88	1st	—	2Q	—	R1	—	Danny Rowe	50	1,565
2017–18	5	Nat	46	20	13	13	82	56	73	7th	QF (Note: Beaten 2–1 in the play-off quarter-final by Boreham Wood.)	R2	—	R1	—	Danny Rowe	30	1,798
2018–19	5	Nat	46	22	15	9	72	41	81	5th	F (Note: Beat Harrogate Town 3–1 in the quarter-final and Solihull Moors in the semi-final, before losing 3–0 to Salford City in the 2019 National League play-off final.)	4Q	—	W (Note: Beat Leyton Orient 1–0 in the FA Trophy final at Wembley Stadium.)	—	Danny Rowe	33	1,655
2019–20	5	Nat	37	9	12	16	44	60	39 (Note: The 2019–20 National League was curtailed due to the COVID-19 pandemic, with league positions, promotions and relegations decided on a points-per-game basis.)	23rd (↓)	—	R3	—	R4	—	Jordan Williams	9	1,470
2020–21	6	Nat N	15	9	3	3	26	16	30	n/a (Note: The 2020–21 National League season was declared null and void due to the COVID-19 pandemic, and all results were expunged with no teams promoted or relegated. Fylde were in 2nd place when the league was stopped.)	—	R1	—	R3	—	Two players (Note: Nick Haughton and Ben Tollitt joint top scorers in the curtailed 2020–21 season with six goals.)	6	0 (Note: Due to the ongoing COVID-19 pandemic all matches were played behind closed doors with no spectators.)
2021–22	6	Nat N	42	2	8	10	68	37	80	3rd	SF (Note: Lost 2–0 in the play-off semi-final to Boston United.)	2Q	—	R3	—	Nick Haughton	26	1,183
2022–23	6	Nat N	46	29	8	9	80	44	95	1st (↑)	—	R1	—	R3	—	Nick Haughton	26	1,079
2023–24	5	Nat	46	15	10	21	74	82	55	18th	—	R1	—	R4	—	Nick Haughton	18	1,375
2024–25	5	Nat	46	11	7	28	50	85	40	23rd (↓)	—	—	—	R3	—	Nick Haughton	19	1,311
