= Roseacre =

Roseacre may refer to:

- Roseacre, Gauteng, South Africa
- Roseacre, Bearsted, Kent, England
- Roseacre, Lancashire, England
