= Listed buildings in Medlar-with-Wesham =

Medlar-with-Wesham is a civil parish in the Borough of Fylde, Lancashire, England. It contains three buildings that are recorded in the National Heritage List for England as designated listed buildings, all of which are listed at Grade II. This grade is the lowest of the three gradings given to listed buildings and is applied to "buildings of national importance and special interest". The parish contains the town of Wesham, and is otherwise rural. The listed buildings consist of a farmhouse, a church, and a war memorial.

== Buildings ==
Name and location	Photograph	Date	Notes
Bradkirk Hall Farmhouse; 53.79421°N 2.89901°W		1764	A brick farmhouse with stone dressings and a slate roof. It has two storeys with attics and a cellar, and a symmetrical five-bay front, with a two-storey extension at the rear. Above the central doorway is an inscribed lintel. The windows on the front are sashes, and at the rear are mullioned windows and stairlights. A large front door lintel bears a prominent keystone lettered "E:H 1764".
Christ Church; 53.79022°N 2.88563°W		1893–94	The initial design of the church was by Paley, Austin and Paley, in Decorated style, and the chancel and steeple were added by Austin and Paley in 1927–28. The church is built in red brick with pink sandstone dressings, the body of the church has a red tiled roof, and on the spire are green slates. It consists of a nave with low aisles, a chancel, and a southwest steeple with an attached porch. The steeple has a three-stage tower with a stepped parapet, and a small octagonal spire.
War memorial 53.78928°N 2.88578°W		c. 1920	The memorial is in limestone and stands on a sandstone base. It consists of a square plinth and a tapering pedestal on which is a soldier standing with bowed head and holding a rifle. On the sides of the pedestal are inscribed panels. The memorial is in an enclosure surrounded by iron railings.
