= Christ Church, Wesham =

Coordinates: 53.7903°N 2.8855°W

Christ Church
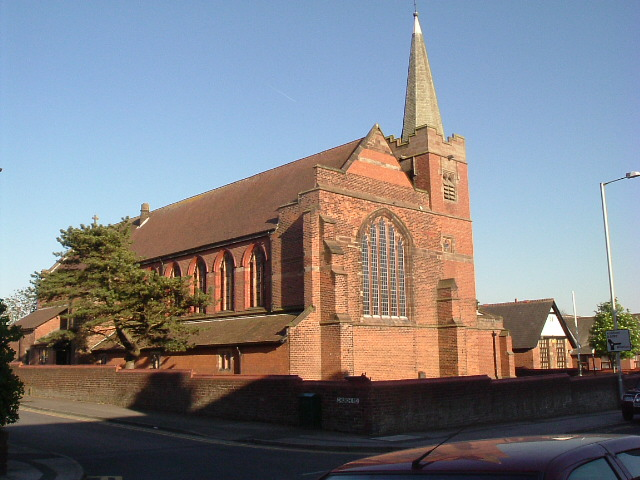
- Christ Church from Garstang Road North

- Location in the Borough of Fylde
- OS grid reference: SD 41762 33024
- Location: Wesham, Lancashire
- Country: England
- Denomination: Anglican

History
- Status: Parish church
- Founded: 1893–94

Architecture
- Functional status: Active
- Heritage designation: Grade II
- Designated: 11 June 1986
- Architect(s): Austin, Paley and Austin; Austin and Paley
- Architectural type: Decorated Perpendicular
- Construction cost: £3,350 (equivalent to £380,000 in 2025)

Administration
- Province: York
- Diocese: Blackburn
- Archdeaconry: Lancaster
- Deanery: Kirkham

Clergy
- Vicar: Jono Peatman (Curate-in-Charge)

Christ Church is an Anglican church in Wesham, a small town in the English county of Lancashire. It is an active parish church in the Diocese of Blackburn and the archdeaconry of Lancaster. It was built 1893–94 by Paley, Austin and Paley, and is recorded in the National Heritage List for England as a designated Grade II listed building.

== History and administration ==
Building of the church started in 1893–94, but at this time the east end was not included. The church was designed by the Lancaster-based architecture firm of Paley, Austin and Paley. The church provided seating for 229 people, and cost £3,350 (equivalent to £450,000 in 2025). In 1927–28, the east end was completed, a south porch was added, and the nave was reseated, increasing the seating to 317. This was carried out by Henry Paley, trading as Austin and Paley, and cost £5,650.

The church was used as a chapel-of-ease to Kirkham until 1913, when it was made a separate parish. The foundation stone was laid on 30 June 1892, by the Lady E. C. Clifton, and the church was consecrated by Bishop Moorhouse on 27 September 1894.

On 11 June 1986, Christ Church was designated a Grade II listed building by English Heritage. The Grade II designation—the third highest of the three grades—is for buildings that are "nationally important and of special interest". An active church in the Church of England, Christ Church is part of the diocese of Blackburn, which is in the Province of York. It is in the archdeaconry of Lancaster and the Deanery of Kirkham. It forms a benefice with Christ Church, Treales.

2013 saw a concert by the singer Graham Kendrick.

Between December 2017 and February 2024 the vicar was Rev Anne Beverley. In 2021, during the COVID-19 national lockdown, a TikTok post by Beverley, intended for seven local teenagers, was viewed by 1.7 million people around the world.

In June 2025 it was announced that the vicar would be soon-to-be Deacon Jono Peatman.

== Architecture ==
Christ Church is in the Decorated Perpendicular style and is constructed of red brick with dressings in red terracotta. The roof is red tile. The church plan consists of a nave and chancel under one roof, with a steeple to the south-west. The tower is of three stages and has a stepped sandstone parapet; the steeple is clad in green slate.

The nave has six bays and internally there are stone piers. The chancel has a large east window with mouchette tracery.

== External features ==
The churchyard contains the war graves of two soldiers of World War I, and four soldiers and a Royal Navy chaplain of World War II. There is also a memorial to the paupers of the Wesham Workhouse.

== Gallery ==
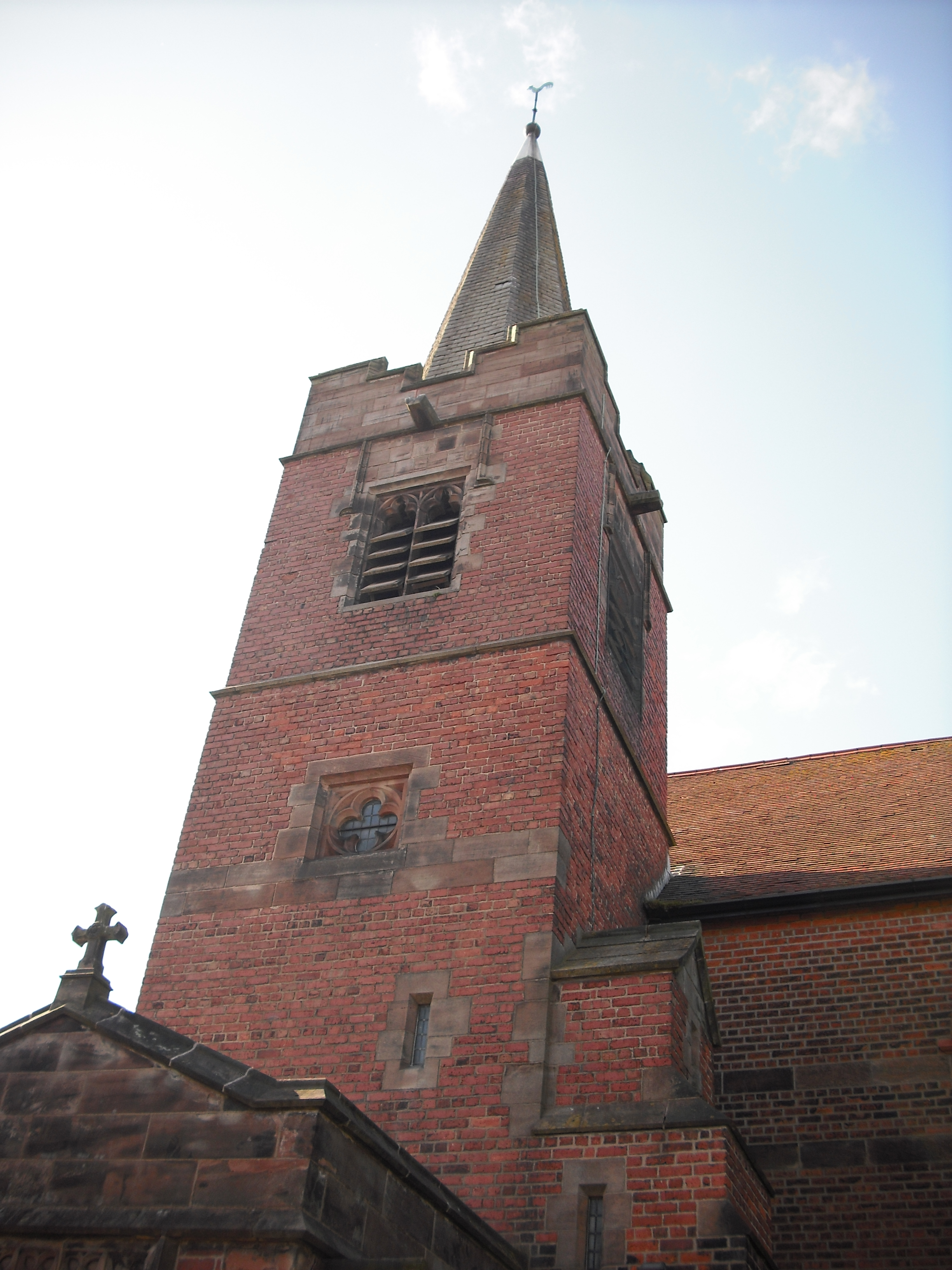
Tower from the south

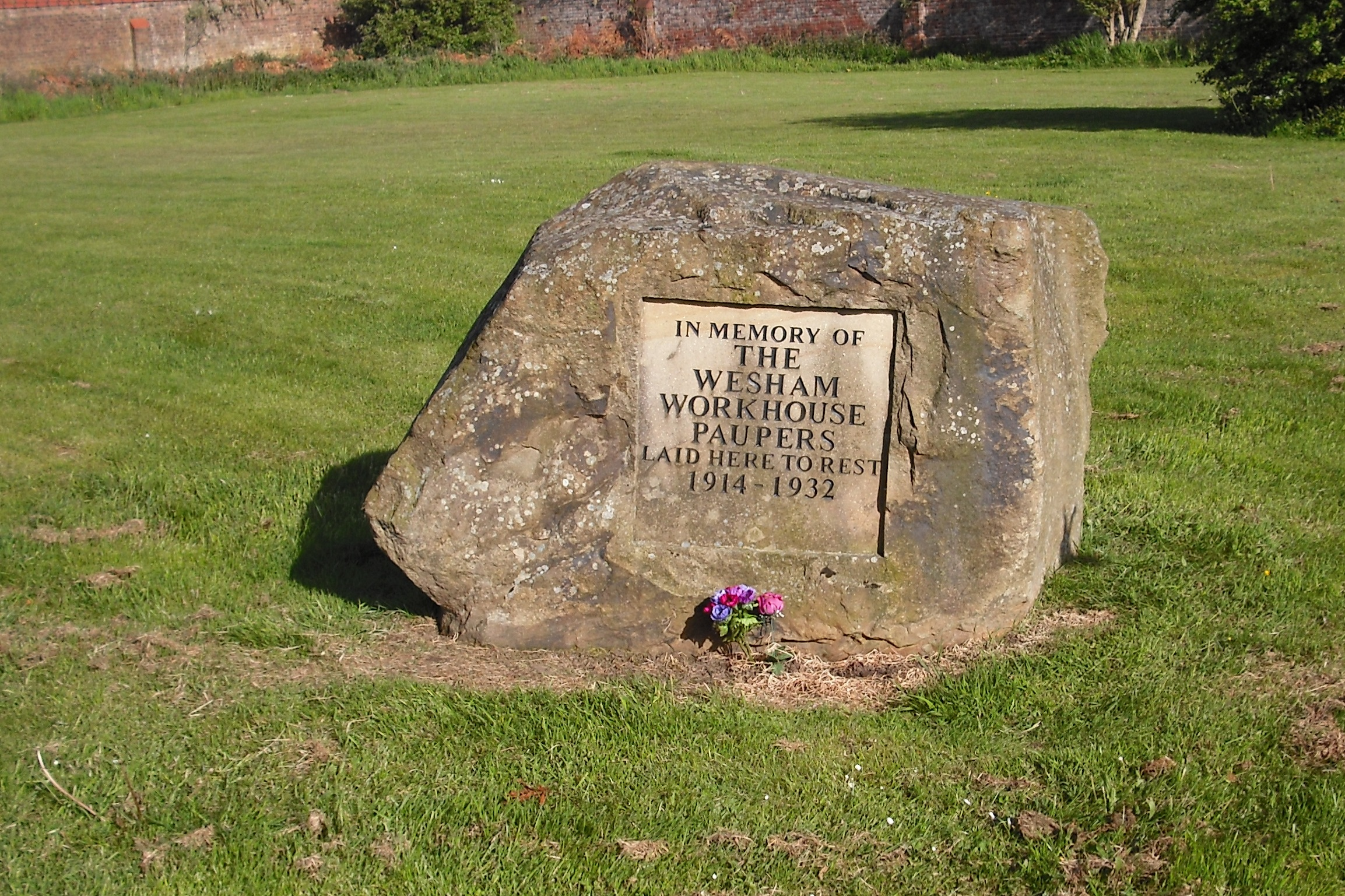
Memorial stone to the Wesham Workhouse paupers

== See also ==
- Listed buildings in Medlar-with-Wesham
- List of works by Paley, Austin and Paley
- List of ecclesiastical works by Austin and Paley (1916–44)
