= AFC Fylde =

Association football club in Wesham, England

- Full name: AFC Fylde
- Nickname: The Coasters
- Founded: 1988
- Ground: Mill Farm, Wesham
- Capacity: 6,000 (2,000 seated)
- Chairman: David Haythornthwaite
- Manager: Craig Mahon
- League: National League
- 2025–26: National League North, 1st of 24 (promoted)
- Website: afcfylde.co.uk
Home colours	Away colours

AFC Fylde is a professional football club based in Wesham in the Borough of Fylde, Lancashire, England. They are currently members of the National League and play at Mill Farm.

Originally known as Kirkham & Wesham following a merger of Kirkham Town and Wesham in 1988, the club adopted its current name in 2008 after winning the FA Vase. In 2007, the club announced the goal of reaching the Conference National by 2017 and the Football League by 2022, the latter objective being printed on club shirts. The club won four promotions between 2007 and 2017 to earn promotion to the fifth tier of English football for the first time. The club experienced two play-off campaigns in their first two seasons in the National League, with the second seeing Fylde miss out on promotion to the Football League after losing to Salford City at Wembley Stadium in the play-off final. However, Fylde returned to Wembley a week later for the 2019 FA Trophy final, defeating Leyton Orient. In the following season, Fylde were relegated back to the National League North. They were National League North champions in 2022–23 and promoted back to the National League. They are the first and so far only club to win both the FA Vase and the FA Trophy.

== History ==
The club was formed by the amalgamation of Kirkham Town and Wesham in 1988, adopting the name of a previous club that had played in the West Lancashire League in the years immediately before World War I. The new club assumed Kirkham Town's place in Division One of the West Lancashire League. In 1989–90 they finished bottom of the division and were relegated to Division Two. After three seasons in Division Two they were promoted in the 1992–93 season after finishing third, only to be relegated again in 1994–95. The following season they finished as runners-up in Division Two, losing only two league games all season, and were promoted back to Division One.

The West Lancashire League was restructured in 1998 with Division One renamed the Premier Division. After finishing fourth in successive seasons in 1997–98 and 1998–99, the club then dominated the Premier Division for a number of years, finishing as champions in seven out of the eight seasons between 1999 and 2000 and 2006–07, the only blip being 2002–03 when they were runners-up. In the 21 months between January 2003 and October 2004, the club did not lose a match in any competition. The run finally ended when they lost a league match, 1–0 to Dalton United. In April 2006 the club completed a hat-trick of consecutive victories in the Lancashire Amateur Shield cup final when they beat fellow West Lancashire League side Charnock Richard 2–0 at the County Ground in Leyland, the club's fourth Shield victory in six years. As the nominated representatives of the Lancashire FA, the club also won the Northern Counties Cup in 2004–05, 2005–06, and 2006–07.

=== North West Counties League ===
Following their West Lancashire League championship success in 2006–07, the club were accepted into Division Two of the North West Counties League for the 2007–08 season. At the club's annual general meeting (AGM) in July 2007, a 15-year plan was put forward with the stated aim of reaching the Conference National by 2017, and the Football League by 2022. The club's first match in the North West Counties League was a home game on 11 August 2007, against Darwen in front of 101 fans, which they won 5–0. The following Tuesday they played their first ever home match under floodlights, winning 2–0 at home to Holker Old Boys On 8 September the club played their first ever match in the FA Vase, beating Northern Counties East League Division One club Worsbrough Bridge Athletic 3–0. The club had also arranged for the FA Vase trophy to be on display before the game.

On 26 January 2008 the club reached the last sixteen of the FA Vase when they beat Studley 3–0. On 9 February they reached the quarter-final after they beat Sussex County League leaders, Crowborough Athletic 2–0 in front of a record crowd of 772 at Crowborough's Alderbrook Recreation Ground. They subsequently defeated Midland Football Alliance club Coventry Sphinx 1–0 in a replay after a 3–3 draw. In the two-legged semi-final against Eastern Counties League Premier Division club, Needham Market, Kirkham & Wesham won 4–2 on aggregate. On 11 May 2008, Kirkham & Wesham won the FA Vase in their first season in the competition, beating Lowestoft Town 2–1 in the final at Wembley Stadium in front of a crowd of 19,537. A goal down for most of the game, Kirkham & Wesham scored twice in the last six minutes, both goals coming from seventeen-year-old substitute Matt Walwyn, son of former Blackpool player Keith Walwyn, who only played the last 11 minutes of the game. Kirkham & Wesham secured prize money of £20,000 for their win, although the total amount the club earned was expected to be around £75,000. The season also saw the club win the Division Two knockout trophy with a 1–0 win over Bootle, as well as securing promotion to the Premier Division when they beat Castleton Gabriels 3–1 on 26 April.

For the start of the 2008–09 season, the club changed their name to AFC Fylde. They won the Premier Division at the first attempt, finishing above New Mills on goal difference and earning promotion to Division One North of the Northern Premier League.

=== Northern Premier League ===
Long-serving manager Mick Fuller was moved upstairs in September 2010 and Kelham O'Hanlon was brought in as first team coach. The club finished in mid-table with a high turnover of playing staff. The following season the club finished fifth, qualifying for the promotion play-offs. After beating Skelmersdale United 1–0 in the semi-final, they lost 2–1 to Chorley in the final.

In the 2011–12 season they were installed as early promotion favourites, but O'Hanlon was replaced as manager in November 2011 after a poor run of results and was quickly replaced by a new management team of Dave Challinor and Colin Woodthorpe. Challinor left Conference North side Colwyn Bay to drop two divisions to join the Coasters, pointing to the club's ambition and plans for the future as the factor that made them move to the Fylde Coast. The club were 16 points off the top of the table when the new management duo arrived at the club but claimed the title with a 1–0 win over Salford City, earning promotion to the Premier Division.

In 2012–13 the club finished fifth, qualifying for the play-offs. However, following a 3–3 draw, they lost out 3–1 on penalties to Hednesford Town in the semi-final. The 2013–14 season saw the club win the Lancashire FA Challenge Trophy (beating Chorley 4–1 at the Reebok Stadium), the Northern Premier League Challenge Cup (with a 1–0 win against Skelmersdale United at Edgeley Park) and gain promotion to the Conference North via the play-offs. After beating Worksop Town 3–1 at home in the play-off semi-final, they defeated Ashton United 4–3 on penalties after a 1–1 draw.

=== National League ===
AFC Fylde finished their first season in the Conference North in second place with 85 points, losing to Guiseley 3–1 on aggregate in the subsequent play-off semi-final. Three Fylde players, Ben Hinchliffe, Josh Langley and Brad Barnes, were selected in the Conference North Team of the Season at end of season AGM awards. Fylde finished the 2015–16 season in third place in the renamed National League North. After beating Harrogate Town 2–1 on aggregate in the two-legged semi-final, they lost 2–1 to North Ferriby United after extra time. In 2016–17 they won the National League North, earning promotion to the National League. In their first season in the National League the club reached the second round of the FA Cup for the first time after beating Kidderminster Harriers 4–2 in the first round. In the second round Fylde drew 1–1 at home to Wigan Athletic before losing the replay 3–2. They went on to finish seventh in the league, qualifying for the expanded play-offs, but lost 2–1 by Boreham Wood in the quarter-final.

In 2018–19 Fylde finished fifth in the National League. They defeated Harrogate Town in the play-off quarter-final and Solihull Moors in semi-final to qualify for the final at Wembley against Salford City. Although the final saw them lose 3–0, the club returned to Wembley a week later in the FA Trophy final and won the competition with a 1–0 victory over Leyton Orient. In October 2019, after eight years with the club, Dave Challinor was sacked with Fylde in the relegation zone. The 2019–20 FA Cup saw the club reach the third round of the FA Cup for the first time; after beating Nantwich Town 1–0 in the first round and Kingstonian 2–0 in the second, they lost 2–1 at Sheffield United in the third round. In 2019–20 Fylde finished second-from-bottom of the division, resulting in their relegation back to the National League North after the season had been cut short due to the COVID-19 pandemic. They finished third in the National League North in 2021–22 before losing 2–0 to Boston United in the play-off semi-finals. However, in 2022–23 the club were National League North champions, earning another promotion to the National League. In 2024–25 the club finished second-from-bottom of the National League and were relegated back to the National League North.

The 2025–26 season saw Fylde win the National League North title, earning an immediate promotion back to the National League.

== Stadium ==
Between 2006 and 2016 the club played home games at Kellamergh Park in the village of Warton, having previously played at the council-owned Coronation Road in Kirkham. In 2005 the club purchased land in Kellamergh and began to develop the facilities at a cost of £150,000 in order to meet the requirement for playing in the North West Counties League.

The new ground was officially opened on 5 August 2006, with a £30,000 200-seat main stand with four rows of seating and a designated press box area. Further improvements were made to the stadium in March 2009 to achieve Ground Grading Grade E (step 4), including additional covered seating and a new directors' box. Kellamergh Park eventually had 533 covered seats and could hold just over 3,000 spectators, having been upgraded during the latter part of the 2014–15 season to meet the Football Conference requirement of 500 covered seats, which were installed in late March 2015 and situated at the south end of the ground behind the goal.

On 19 January 2008 the club announced plans for a further move to yet another new stadium at an unnamed 26-acre (11 ha) site. In February 2010, a charitable trust called the Haythornthwaite Sports Foundation unveiled plans for a new Community Sports Complex in Wrea Green, comprising outdoor sports facilities catering for local junior football, cricket and other sports plus a new 2,500 capacity stadium for AFC Fylde. Consultations took place in 2011 but a planning application was rejected by Fylde Borough Council in spring 2012.

On 3 September 2013 it was announced that plans had been drawn up for a new £18m development, Mill Farm Sports Village, on the outskirts of Wesham, close to junction 3 of the M55. This included a distribution centre, an Aldi supermarket, a hotel, a restaurant, a petrol station, community sports pitches, sports science facilities, and a 6,000-capacity Football League standard football stadium. The stadium plans include a 2,000 capacity all-seater main stand with a supporters' bar, executive boxes and a function room. The planning application for the stadium and associated facilities was accepted by Fylde Borough Council on 4 June 2014, and the ground opened on 13 August 2016 for the club's first National League North match of the season against Brackley Town.

== Current squad ==
As of 31 October 2026

Note: Flags indicate national team as defined under FIFA eligibility rules; some limited exceptions apply. Players may hold more than one non-FIFA nationality.

No.	Pos.	Nation	Player
1	GK	NZL	Zac Jones
2	DF	IRL	Alex Healy-Byrne
3	DF	ENG	Harvey Broad (on loan from Coventry City)
4	MF	ENG	Ethan Mitchell
5	DF	ENG	Max Taylor
6	MF	ENG	Chris Merrie
7	FW	ENG	Luca Thomas
8	MF	ENG	Tom Whelan
10	MF	ENG	Danny Mayor
11	FW	ENG	Dylan Allen-Hadley
14	MF	ENG	Greg Olley
15	DF	ENG	Will Lancaster
16	MF	ENG	Ben Jackson
17	DF	IRL	Corey Whelan (captain)
18	MF	ENG	Theo Upton (on loan from Blackpool)

No.	Pos.	Nation	Player
19	FW	NED	Cedric Main
20	MF	ENG	Max Fisher
21	MF	ENG	Faris Mo
22	FW	ENG	Jack Morris
23	MF	ENG	Luke McCormick (on loan from Yeovil Town)
24	DF	ENG	Cullen Meadowcroft
25	GK	ENG	Pat Boyes
26	MF	SCO	Luke Butterfield (on loan from Chesterfield)
27	GK	ENG	George Pickford (on loan from Everton)
28	FW	ENG	Millar Matthews-Lewis (on loan from Burton Albion)
29	DF	ENG	Aaron Drewe
30	FW	ENG	Kyrell Malcolm (on loan from Salford City)
31	DF	ENG	Adam Lewis
32	MF	ENG	Archie Lang
—	FW	ENG	Ayden Wainwright

== Coaching staff ==
Position	Name
Manager	Craig Mahon
Assistant manager	Alex Kenyon
Goalkeeping coach	Chris Neal
Performance Analyst	Aaron Minton
Physio	Paige Morris
Academy Manager	Nathan Delfouneso
Director of Football	James Keyworth
Source: AFC Fylde

== Honours ==
- National League
  - National League North champions 2016–17, 2022–23, 2025–26
- Northern Premier League
  - Division One North champions 2011–12
  - Challenge Cup winners 2013–14
  - President's Cup winners 2013–14
- North West Counties League
  - Premier Division champions 2008–09
- West Lancashire League
  - Premier Division champions 1999–2000, 2000–01, 2001–02, 2003–04, 2004–05, 2005–06, 2006–07
- FA Trophy
  - 2018–19
- FA Vase
  - 2007–08
- Lancashire FA Challenge Trophy
  - Winners 2010–11, 2012–13, 2013–14
- Northern Inter Counties Cup
  - Winners 2004–05, 2005–06, 2006–07
- Lancashire Amateur Shield
  - Winners 2000–01, 2003–04, 2004–05, 2005–06
- Richardson Cup
  - Winners 1998–99, 1999–2000, 2000–01, 2004–05, 2005–06
- Presidents Cup
  - Winners 1995–96

== Records ==
- Best FA Cup performance: Third round, 2019–20
- Best FA Trophy performance: Winners, 2018–19
- Best FA Vase performance: Winners, 2007–08
- Record attendance: 3,858 vs Chorley, National League North, 26 December 2016
- Biggest victory: 10–0 vs Droylsden, Northern Premier League Premier Division, 29 October 2013

== See also ==
- List of AFC Fylde seasons
- AFC Fylde players
- AFC Fylde managers
- AFC Fylde Women
