= Mill Farm Sports Village =

Sport facility in Lancashire, England

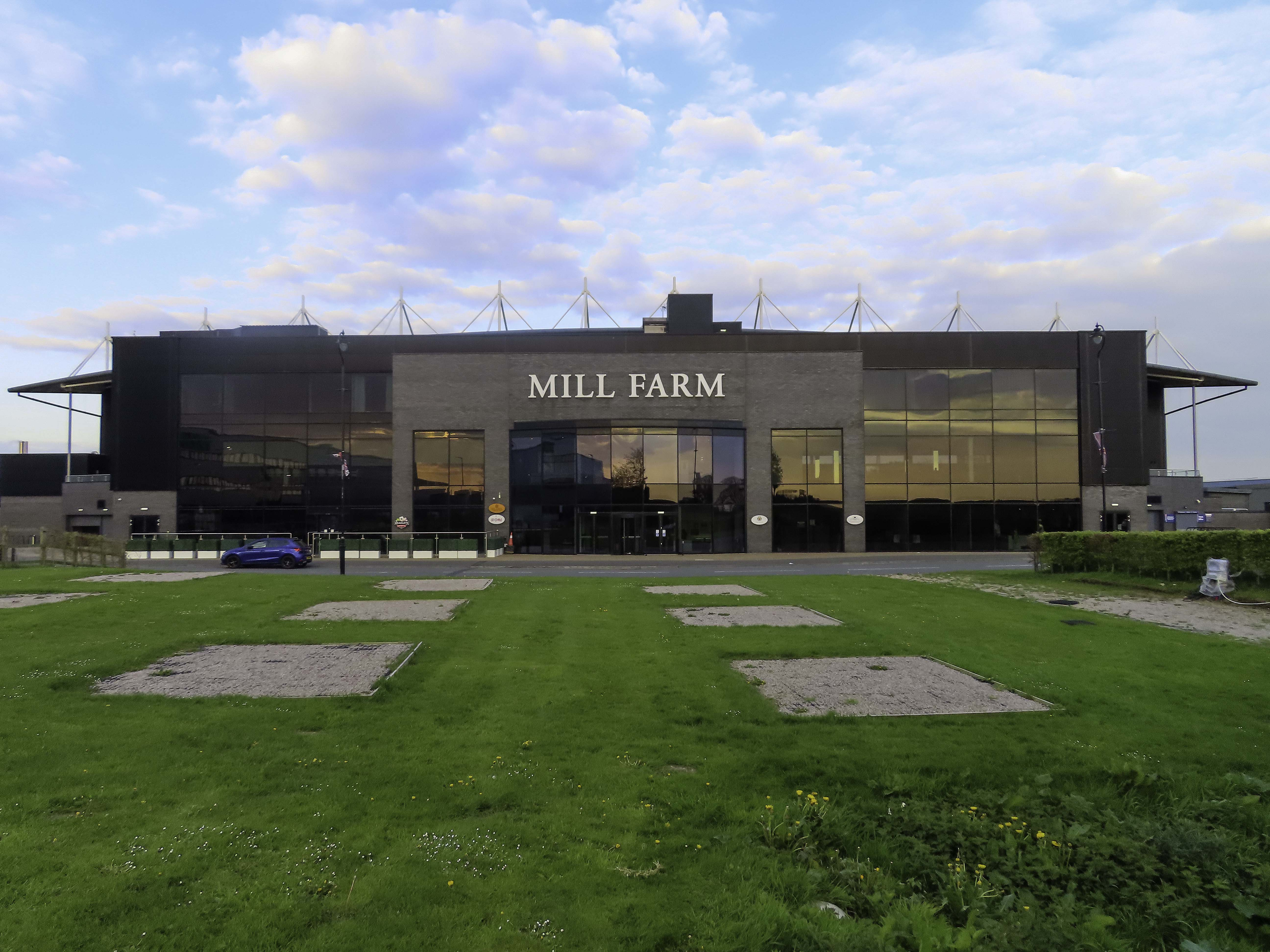
- The stadium's main stand and a block of offices in April 2022

- Location in Fylde, Lancashire
- Location: Coronation Way, Wesham PR4 3JZ; Lancashire, England
- Coordinates: 53.7973°N 2.8890°W
- Owner: Mill Farm Ventures Ltd., Lytham St Annes UK
- Capacity: 6,000
- Executive suites: Yes
- Surface: Grass
- Scoreboard: Yes

Construction
- Opened: 13 August 2016
- Architects: Frank Whittle Partnership Ltd., Preston UK
- Main contractors: Warden Construction Ltd., Preston, UK

Tenant
- AFC Fylde (2016–present)

Mill Farm Sports Village is a multi-sport facility located on the outskirts of the town of Wesham in the Borough of Fylde in Lancashire, England. Facilities include the Mill Farm football stadium, home to the football team AFC Fylde since 2016, and several 3G football and hockey pitches.

== History ==
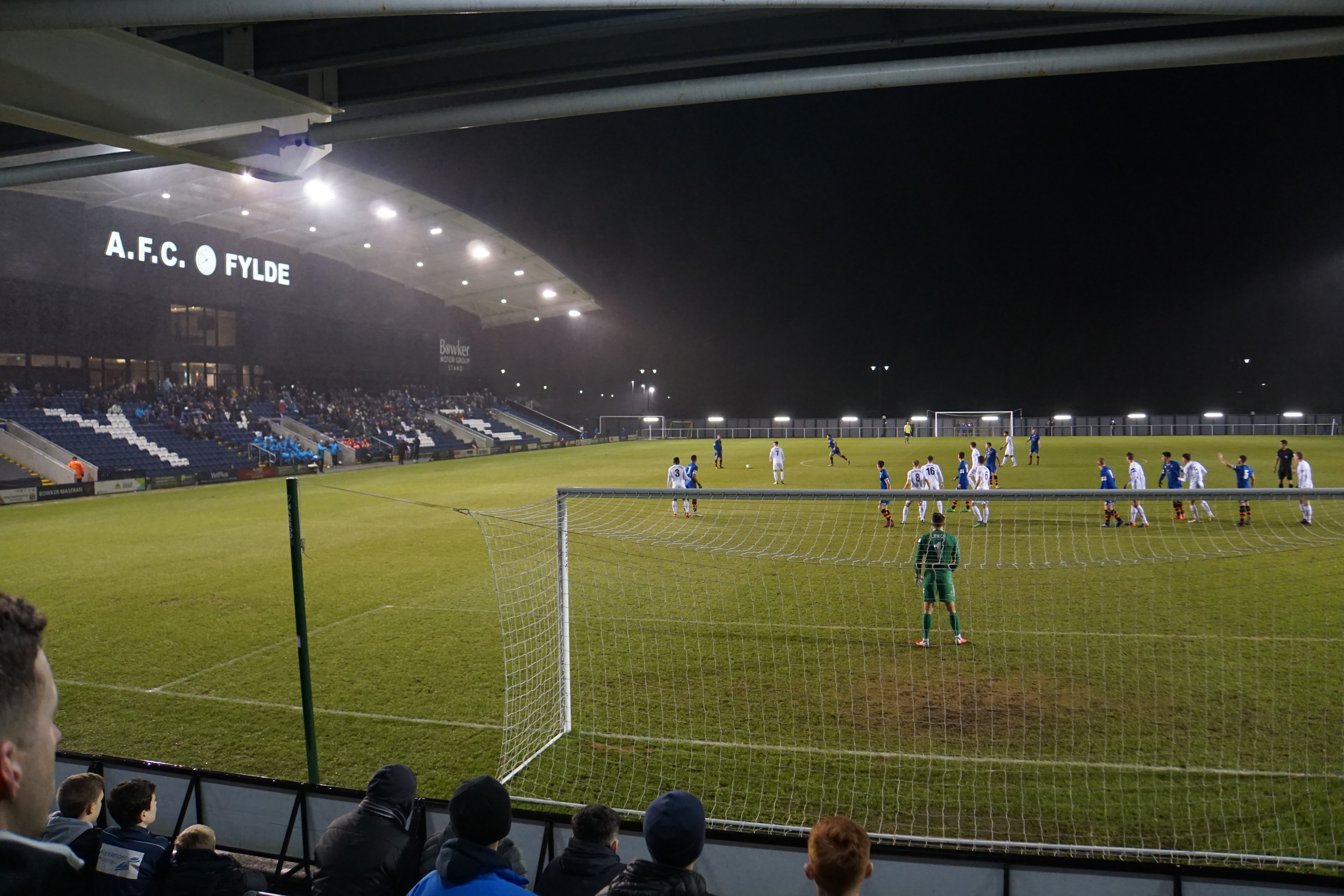
Inside the football stadium during an AFC Fylde match in February 2019

On 19 January 2008, AFC Fylde announced plans to move from their current ground at Kellamergh Park in the village of Warton to a then unnamed location, and in February 2010 unveiled plans for a new Community Sports Complex in Wrea Green; however, the planning application was rejected by Fylde Council in April 2012.

On 3 September 2013, the club announced that new plans had been drawn up for a £18 million multi-sport development, Mill Farm Sports Village, on the outskirts of Wesham. As well as a 6,000-capacity Football League standard football stadium with supporters' facilities, the development would include community sports pitches, sports science facilities, and commercial opportunities including a supermarket. The planning application for the stadium and associated facilities was accepted by Fylde Borough Council on 4 June 2014.

The Preston architecture company the Frank Whittle Partnership Limited (the FWP group), who have been involved in the successful design and delivery of a number of other football stadiums in Lancashire was chosen to design the sporting village. The prime developer chosen was Warden Construction Limited, also of Preston. Construction began in March 2015 and was completed by the middle of 2016. The ground opened on 13 August 2016 for the club's first National League North match of the season against Brackley Town. The final cost of the sports village was approximately £25 million.

== Design and facilities ==
The main structure within Mill Farm Sports Village is the football stadium.

The stadium is designed to hold up to 6,000 spectators in three stands. The main grandstand offers 2,000 seats and hospitality areas, and the east and south stands provide covered terracing. The stadium is decorated almost solely in black and white colours for its outer/inner cladding and combines a smooth, curved roof.

Customer facilities include:

- 290-seat sports bar ("Bradley's") featuring over 20 large-screen TVs
- 80-seat restaurant with roof terrace
- 40-seat cafe
- conference and event facilities across 9 rooms

== Other facilities ==
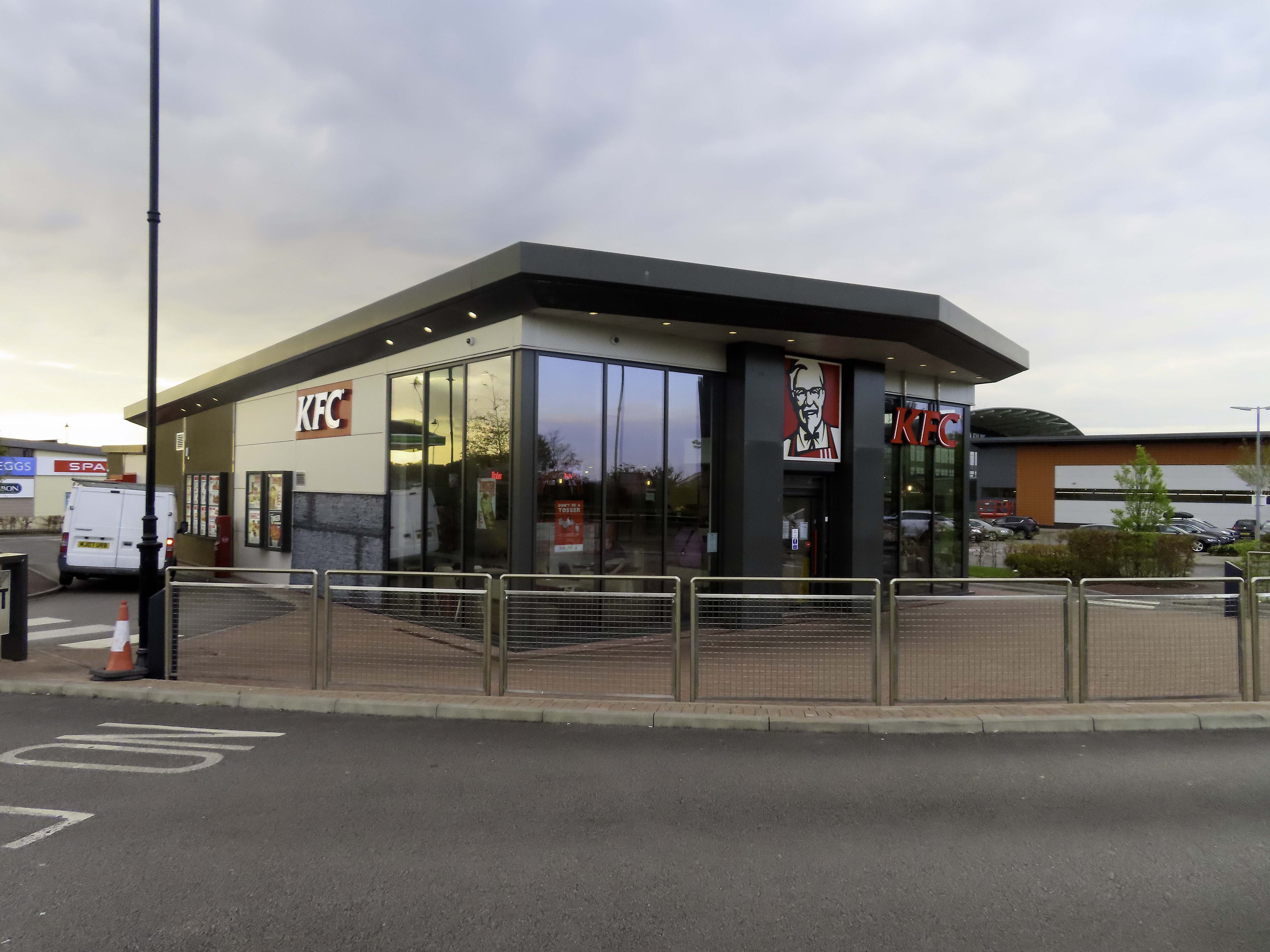
The KFC restaurant at the Mill Farm Sports Village in April 2022

=== Other sporting facilities ===
As well as the football stadium, the Mill Farm Sports Village also contains artificial turf football and hockey pitches for community use, and a sports science centre.

=== Commercial facilities ===
Mill Farm Sports Village also contains an Aldi supermarket, Euro Garages petrol station with a Spar, Greggs bakery and KFC fast food restaurant. There are future opportunities for a 60-bed hotel on-site.

== Prizes and honours ==
In 2017, the project team behind the Mill Farm Sports Village, composed of representatives from Warden Construction, Frank Whittle Partnership, Mill Farm Ventures and AFC Fylde, PWA Planning, Partington and Associates, Petit Singleton Associates, Preston City Council and Fylde Borough Council, was a regional winner in Local Authority Building Control North West Awards. The judges praised the winners for their: “innovative and creative solutions and building control professionalism that leads to safe, sustainable and high quality construction projects.”

== Criticism ==
Not long after its opening in 2016, Mill Farm Sports Village was criticised by fans and community groups for failing to provide sufficient on-site car parking, and creating traffic problems for the surrounding roads. Following visits from its planning inspectors in 2018, the Fylde Council ruled that Mill Farm's parking facilities and AFC Fylde's traffic management plans were "inadequate".
