= 2019 FA Trophy final =

2019 FA Trophy Final
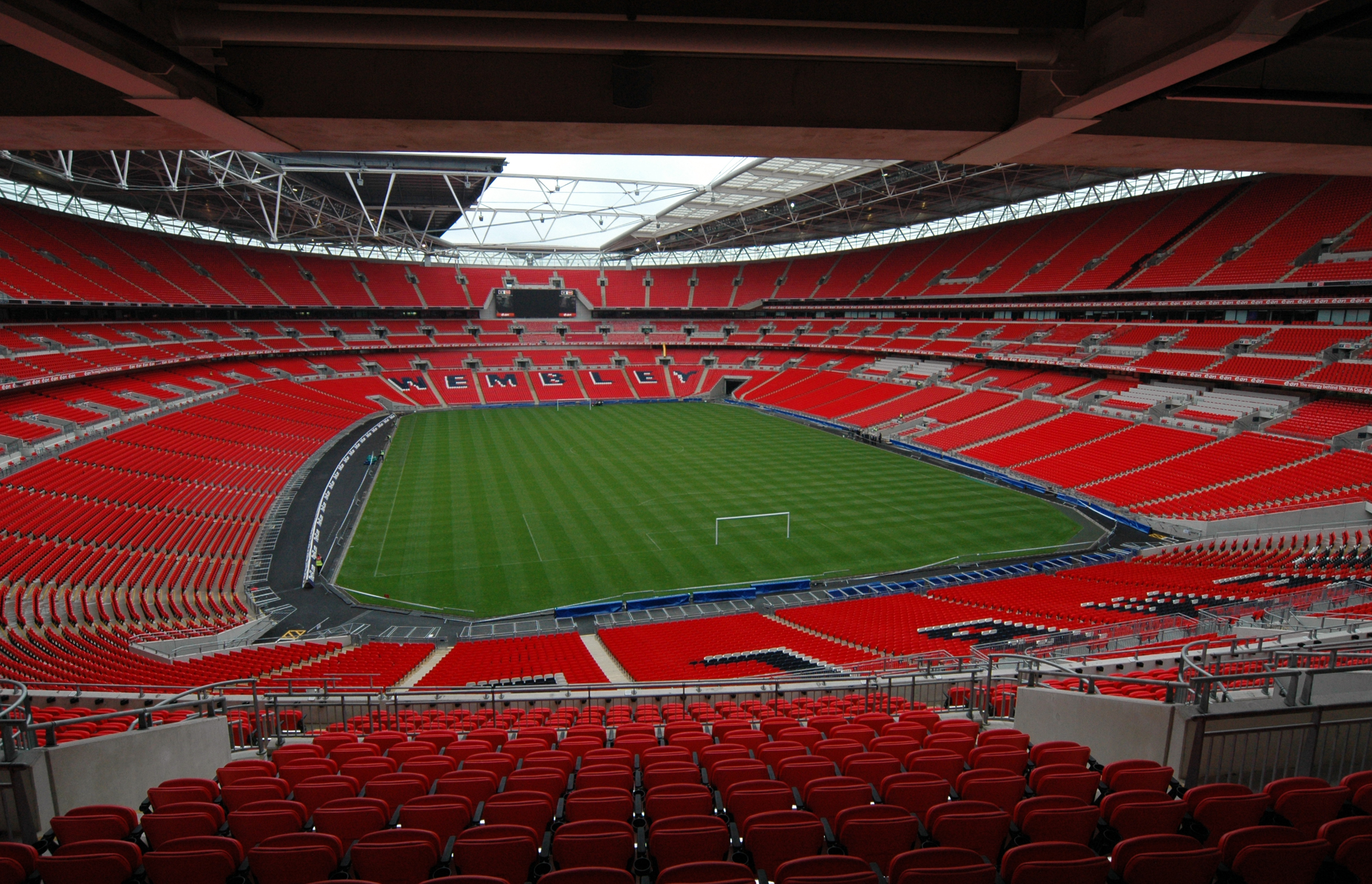
- Wembley Stadium hosted the final
- Event: 2018–19 FA Trophy
AFC Fylde	Leyton Orient
1	0
- Date: 19 May 2019
- Venue: Wembley Stadium, London
- Man of the Match: Nick Haughton (AFC Fylde)
- Referee: Andrew Madley
- Attendance: 42,962
- Weather: Sunny

The 2019 FA Trophy Final was a football match between AFC Fylde and Leyton Orient on 19 May 2019. It was the final match of the 2018–19 FA Trophy, the 50th season of the FA Trophy.

== Route to the final ==
=== AFC Fylde ===
15 December 2018 First Round	AFC Fylde	5–1	Stratford Town	Wesham
15:00 GMT				Stadium: Mill Farm; Attendance: 491

12 January 2019 Second Round	AFC Fylde	1–0	Biggleswade Town	Wesham
15:00 GMT				Stadium: Mill Farm; Attendance: 594

2 February 2019 Third Round	Ramsbottom United	P–P	AFC Fylde	Ramsbottom
15:00 GMT				Stadium: Harry Williams Riverside Stadium

5 February 2019 Third Round	Ramsbottom United	5–5	AFC Fylde	Ramsbottom
19:45 GMT				Stadium: Harry Williams Riverside Stadium; Attendance: 743

12 February 2019 Third Round Replay	AFC Fylde	4–1	Ramsbottom United	Wesham
19:45 GMT				Stadium: Mill Farm; Attendance: 743

23 February 2019 Quarter-Final	AFC Fylde	0–0 (4–1 p)	Barnet	Wesham
15:00 GMT				Stadium: Mill Farm; Attendance: 795

16 March 2019 Semi-Final 1st Leg	AFC Fylde	0–0	Stockport County	Wesham
15:00 GMT				Stadium: Mill Farm; Attendance: 2,605; Referee: Marc Edwards

23 March 2019 Semi-Final 2nd Leg	Stockport County	2–3 (2–3 agg.)	AFC Fylde	Stockport
15:00 GMT	Bell 25'; Palmer 88'		Rowe 65' (pen.); Croasdale 85'; Reid 89'	Stadium: Edgeley Park; Attendance: 6,064; Referee: Seb Stockbridge

=== Leyton Orient ===
15 December 2018 First Round	Leyton Orient	4–0	Beaconsfield Town	Leyton
15:00 GMT				Stadium: Brisbane Road; Attendance: 1,177

12 January 2019 Second Round	Wrexham	0–1	Leyton Orient	Wrexham
15:00 GMT				Stadium: Racecourse Ground; Attendance: 1,949

2 February 2019 Third Round	Leyton Orient	1–0	Blyth Spartans	Leyton
15:00 GMT				Stadium: Brisbane Road; Attendance: 1,842

23 February 2019 Quarter-Final	Brackley Town	1–2	Leyton Orient	Brackley
15:00 GMT				Stadium: St. James Park; Attendance: 1,563

16 March 2019 Semi-Final 1st Leg	Leyton Orient	1–0	AFC Telford United	Leyton
15:00 GMT	Bonne 53'			Stadium: Brisbane Road; Attendance: 3,622; Referee: David Rock

23 March 2019 Semi-Final 2nd Leg	AFC Telford United	1–2 (1–3 agg.)	Leyton Orient	Telford
15:00 GMT	Deeney 39'		Harrold 6'; Coulson 77'	Stadium: New Bucks Head; Attendance: 3,478; Referee: Peter Wright

== Match ==
=== Details ===
19 May 2019
16:15

AFC Fylde	1–0	Leyton Orient
Rowe 60'	Report

Wembley Stadium, London
Attendance: 42,962
Referee: Andrew Madley

GK	1	(England) Jay Lynch
RB	16	(England) Arlen Birch	(substituted off) 90+3'
CB	4	(Republic of Ireland) Neill Byrne (c)	(substituted off) 12'
CB	5	(England) Jordan Tunnicliffe
LB	3	(Antigua and Barbuda) Zaine Francis-Angol
RM	8	(England) Ryan Croasdale
CM	10	(England) Danny Philliskirk
CM	27	(England) Nick Haughton	(substituted off) 74'
CM	6	(England) Andy Bond
LM	30	(England) Alex Reid
FW	9	(England) Danny Rowe
Substitutes:
GK	13	(England) Russell Griffiths
DF	18	(England) Timi Odusina	(substituted on) 74'
DF	21	(England) Tom Brewitt	(substituted on) 12'
MF	7	(England) James Hardy
MF	11	(England) Tom Crawford	(substituted on) 90+3'
Manager: (England) Dave Challinor

GK	1	(England) Dean Brill
RB	23	(England) Jamie Turley	(substituted off) 46'
CB	21	(England) Marvin Ekpiteta
CB	6	(England) Josh Coulson
CB	15	(England) Dan Happe	(substituted off) 68'
LB	3	(England) Joe Widdowson
CM	7	(Jamaica) Jobi McAnuff (c)	(substituted off) 78'
CM	8	(England) Craig Clay
AM	16	(England) James Brophy
FW	19	(England) Josh Koroma
FW	9	(Zimbabwe) Macauley Bonne
Substitutes:
GK	24	(England) Sam Sargeant
DF	2	(England) Sam Ling
MF	10	(England) Jordan Maguire-Drew	(substituted on) 46'
MF	22	(England) Charlie Lee	(substituted on) 78'
FW	18	(England) Matt Harrold	(substituted on) 68'
Manager: (England) Justin Edinburgh

Man of the match: Nick Haughton (AFC Fylde)

Match officials

- Assistant referees:

Nick Hopton
Akil Howson

- Fourth official:

Matt Donohue

Match rules

- 90 minutes.
- 30 minutes of extra-time if necessary.
- Penalty shoot-out if scores still level.
- Five named substitutes.
- Maximum of three substitutions.
