= Roseacre, Gauteng =

Roseacre
- Location within Gauteng Location within South Africa
- Coordinates: 26.239°S 28.081°E
- Country: South Africa
- Province: Gauteng
- Municipality: City of Johannesburg
- Main Place: Johannesburg
- Established: 1947

Area
  - Total: 0.60 km^{2} (0.23 sq mi)

Population (2011)
  - Total: 1,709
  - Density: 2,800/km^{2} (7,400/sq mi)

Racial makeup (2011)
  - Black African: 35.9%
  - Coloured: 14.0%
  - Indian/Asian: 6.9%
  - White: 37.4%
  - Other: 5.7%

First languages (2011)
  - English: 50.6%
  - Afrikaans: 17.0%
  - Zulu: 8.7%
  - Xhosa: 2.7%
  - Other: 21.0%
- Time zone: UTC+2 (SAST)
- Postal code (street): 2197

Roseacre is a suburb of Johannesburg, South Africa. It is located in Region F of the City of Johannesburg Metropolitan Municipality.

== History ==
Prior to the discovery of gold on the Witwatersrand in 1886, the suburb lay on land on one of the original farms called Klipriviersberg. It was a proclaimed a suburb on 14 May 1947 and named after the lands owner, William Harrison and his home town of Roseacre, Lancashire.
