= Listed buildings in Treales, Roseacre and Wharles =

Treales, Roseacre and Wharles is a civil parish in the Borough of Fylde, Lancashire, England. It contains six buildings that are recorded in the National Heritage List for England as designated listed buildings, all of which are listed at Grade II. This grade is the lowest of the three gradings given to listed buildings and is applied to "buildings of national importance and special interest". The parish contains small settlements, but is mainly rural. The listed buildings consist of dwellings, a public house, a school, and a converted windmill.

== Buildings ==
Name and location	Photograph	Date	Notes
Rhododendron Cottage; 53.80093°N 2.85711°W		17th century (or earlier)	A cruck-framed cottage in brick with a thatched roof. It is in a single storey with an attic, and has a front of three bays. The windows are sliding sashes. Inside the cottage is a full cruck truss at each end.
Pointer House; 53.81487°N 2.83949°W	—	Mid-17th century (probable)	A farmhouse that was extended at the north end, and later converted into a house. It is in brick with some stone quoins, a thatched roof, and crow-stepped gables. There are two storeys and four bays, with a gabled porch on the front. Most of the windows contain altered glazing. Inside there is said to be an inglenook and bressumer.
Derby Arms Inn; 53.78975°N 2.84843°W		Early 18th century	Originally a farmhouse, it was extended in the 19th century and has been converted into a public house and restaurant. The building has an L-shaped plan with the two ranges at right angles; both are in brick, and have two storeys. The older part, originally in two bays, later extended into three, has a thatched roof and sliding sash windows. The newer part has a hipped slate roof, and a symmetrical three-bay front that has a central round-headed doorway with a keystone and imposts. The windows are sashes.
Ivy Dene Farmhouse and barn 53.80520°N 2.85763°W		Early 18th century (probable)	A former farmhouse and integral barn, later used as a house and garage. The building is roughcast on a chamfered plinth and is thought to be timber-framed. There are two storeys and a front of five bays, with a crow-stepped gable on the left. On the front are a gabled porch, windows and double wagon doors.
Treales Windmill; 53.78844°N 2.84085°W		Late 18th century (probable)	The former windmill has been converted into a house. It is in rendered brick, and consists of a four-storey tapering circular tower, and has a conical tiled roof. The building contains rectangular windows, and an inserted garage door.
Treales Primary School; 53.80456°N 2.84506°W	—	1872	The school and attached master's house were designed by James Hibbert. They are in red brick with stone dressings and slate roofs, and are in an H-shaped plan, with the house on the left. Between the two is a range of 1 1/2 storeys with two gabled dormers, to the left is the gabled two storey wing of the house, and to the right the school has a tall gabled single-storey hall with three lancet windows. Most of the windows are sashes.
