= Matt Walwyn =

English footballer

Personal information
- Date of birth: 23 June 1990 (age 36)
- Place of birth: Kirkham, England
- Height: 1.83 m (6 ft 0 in)
- Position: Striker

Senior career*
| Years | Team | Apps | (Gls) |
| 2007–2011 | Kirkham & Wesham / AFC Fylde | | |
| 2011 | Southport | | |
| 2011 | Skelmersdale United | 7 | (11) |
| 2011–2012 | Chorley | 25 | (13) |
| 2012 | Droylsden | 5 | (0) |
| 2012–2016 | FC United of Manchester | 61 | (13) |

International career^{‡}
| 2015 | Saint Kitts and Nevis | 2 | (0) |
- * Club domestic league appearances and goals as of 18:55, 5 October 2017 (UTC) ‡ National team caps and goals as of 18:55, 5 October 2017 (UTC)

Matthew Walwyn (born 23 June 1990) is a footballer who plays as a striker. Born in England, he represents Saint Kitts and Nevis at international level.

== Career ==
Born in Kirkham, Walwyn has played in non-league football for Kirkham & Wesham / AFC Fylde, Southport, Skelmersdale United, Chorley, Droylsden and FC United of Manchester.

He earned his first call-up from the Saint Kitts and Nevis national team in June 2015, making two substitute appearances later that year.

== Personal life ==
His father Keith was also a footballer.

== Honours ==
Kirkham & Wesham

- FA Vase: 2007–08
