= Medlar-with-Wesham =

Civil parish in Lancashire, England

Coordinates: 53.7902°N 2.8857°W

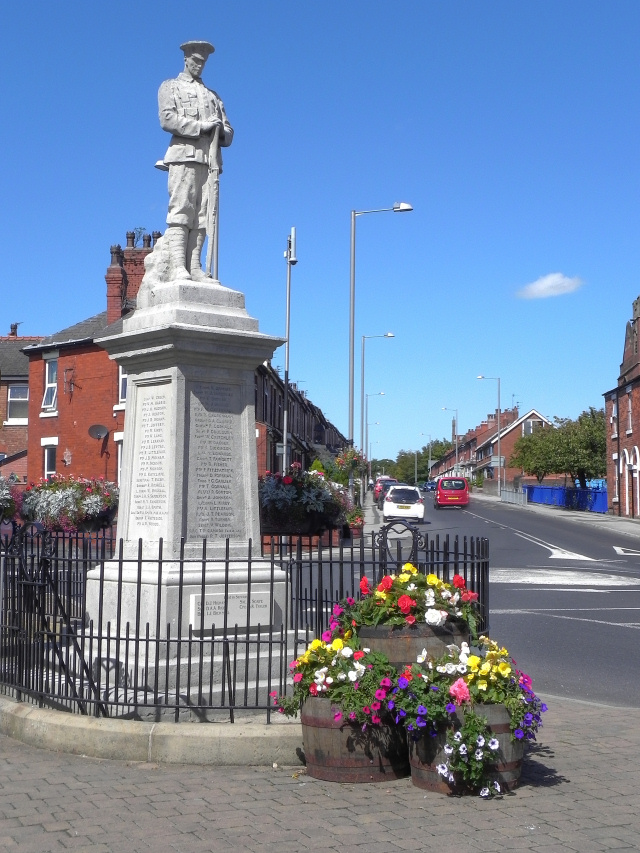
- War memorial, the Square, Wesham

- Shown within Fylde Borough Shown within the Fylde Location within Lancashire
- Population: 3,584 (2021)
- OS grid reference: SD418330
- Civil parish: Medlar-with-Wesham
- District: Fylde
- Shire county: Lancashire
- Region: North West
- Country: England
- Sovereign state: United Kingdom
- Post town: PRESTON
- Postcode district: PR4
- Dialling code: 01772
- Police: Lancashire
- Fire: Lancashire
- Ambulance: North West
- UK Parliament: Fylde
- Website: wesham-tc.gov.uk

Medlar-with-Wesham (locally /ˈwɛsəm/ WESS-əm) is a civil parish and an electoral ward on the Fylde in Lancashire, England, which contains the town of Wesham and the hamlet of Medlar. It lies within the Borough of Fylde, and had a population of 3,245 in 1,294 households recorded in the 2001 census rising to 3,584 in 1,511 households, at the 2021 census. Wesham is adjacent to the town of Kirkham.

== History ==
The name Medlar derives from a combination of the Old English middel meaning 'middle' and the Old Norse erg meaning 'shieling'. The name Wesham derives from the plural form of the Old English westhūs meaning 'west houses'.

In John Cary's 1794 map of England, Wales, and Scotland, the separate settlements are shown as Medlar and Westham. A Topographical Dictionary of England, published by Samuel Lewis in 1848, says:

This place is stated to have come to the Hospitallers of St. John of Jerusalem by the gift of Cicely, daughter of Roger de Gernet; the Lancasters subsequently gave it to the abbey of Cockersand. On the dissolution of monasteries, the land seems to have been granted or sold to the family of Westby; in the reign of Philip and Mary, William Westbye held "Medlarghe," "Wessham," and other property in this quarter, and his descendants long continued to reside at Mowbrick Hall, now a farmhouse. Bradkirk, in the township, was possessed in the reign of Edward III., as a manor, by a family of the same name, and was their residence for centuries: the estate became latterly the property of Hugh Hornby, Esq., of Ribby Hall, by purchase from Mr. Kearsley.

— A Topographical Dictionary of England, 1848

Mowbreck Hall (destroyed by fire in the 1960s)

The area within the boundaries of the parish has been populated since early medieval times, prior to the Norman Conquest, with separate settlements at Bradkirk, Medlar, Wesham and Mowbreck. There was also a single moated farmstead at Pasture Barn midway between Medlar and Mowbreck. The present bridleway of Mowbreck Lane was the medieval route to Treales.

The modern town of Wesham is only about 160 years old, and developed as the railway expanded to serve the growing popularity of resort towns such as Blackpool. From the 1920s to the 1950s huge numbers of steam trains plied their way to the coast via the railway station at Kirkham and Wesham. Locals pronounce the name Wess-um. Situated to the north of the railway station, from 1/2 to 2 1/2 miles (1 to 4 km) north of Kirkham, in 1870–72 it had an area of 1,971 acres (798 ha) and property worth £3,441. The population in 1851 was 170 but by 1861 was 563. The increase of population was mainly due employment opportunities offered by the cotton mills. At that time the manor of Wesham, with Mowbreck Hall, belonged to J. T. Fazakerley-Westby. The hall was of red brick, castellated with stone and contained a domestic Roman Catholic chapel. It was once reputed to be haunted and had at one time been used as a Catholic school, one of whose pupils was Bible scholar George Leo Haydock.

A large school, used also as a lecture hall, belonging to the Independents, was built at Wesham in 1864 and opened in 1866. The site is now used as a retail showroom. The boundaries of Wesham were established over 100 years ago and did not change until local government changes in 1935 meant that 82 acres (33 ha) and 48 residents were transferred to Kirkham. Kirkham lost only 8 acres (3.2 ha) of land, but with no loss of residents.

A new workhouse, to replace the original in Kirkham, was built in the early 20th century to designs by Charles S. Haywood and Fred Harrison. The planning was modern for its time, with separate provision for single men and women, and a cottage to accommodate married couples. The buildings were faced with Accrington bricks, and stone dressings, the masonry work being undertaken by Sam Wilson of Lytham St. Annes. During the First World War the buildings were used as a military hospital and later became Wesham Park Hospital, a specialist geriatric and psychiatric institution. After the hospital closed in 2011, the site continued to be used as offices by NHS Fylde and Wyre Clinical Commissioning Group (CCG) and other tenants, but fell vacant in November 2019. The remainder of the site became a brownfield development site for housing.

== Industry and commerce ==
Wesham Bakery, now the home of Fox's Biscuits and the largest current commercial concern, was opened in 1957, on the site previously occupied by Phoenix Mill. The factory is the home of Fox's "Rocky" biscuit. There is also a range of small retail businesses, a number of larger retailers and some recent light industrial and small business development in the north of the parish near junction 3 of the M55 motorway. A private residence on Fleetwood Road is the base for a Bell UH-1 Iroquois helicopter, the only flying HUEY in the UK.

Bradkirk Business Park, on the Weeton Road, opened in 2020 and comprises nine fully refurbished and modernised former agricultural buildings, which are used by variety of trades, including saddlery and light engineering.

In May 2025 planning permission was granted for the construction of a £30m factory, at the Mill Farm business park on Fleetwood Road, for HTI Toys Group. The 160,000-square-foot (15,000 m^{2}) development is expected to provide employment for up to 186 full-time equivalent jobs.

In April 2026 plans were submitted to convert the Old Fire Station, at 50 Station Road, into an MOT testing station. First opened in 1926, the station was home to the Wesham Fire Department which moved to at a new site on Fleetwood Road in October 1991.

== Amenities ==
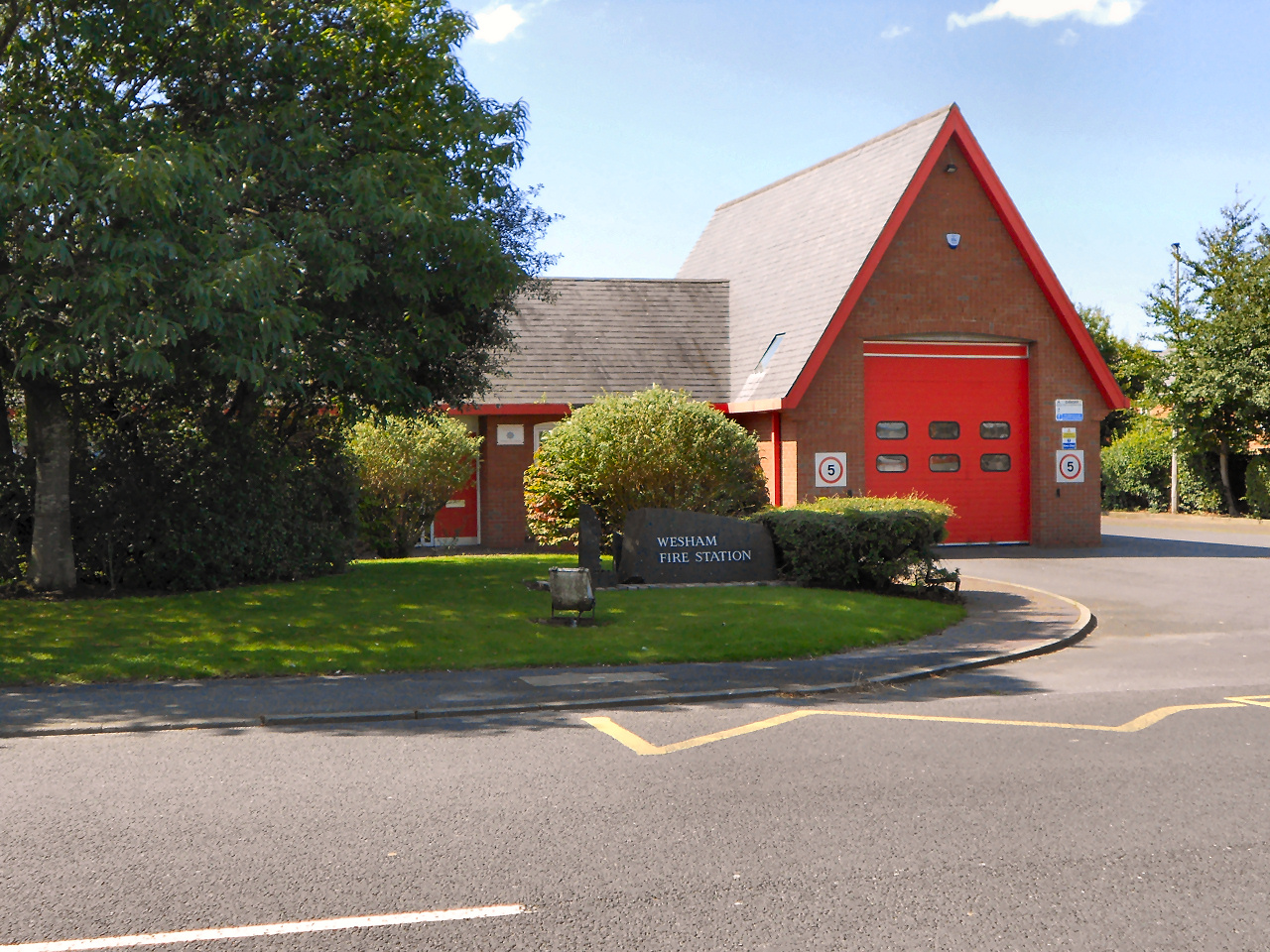
Wesham Fire Station

At the centre of the town is the small war memorial, with a stone statue of a First World War soldier, which has an annual service of Remembrance Sunday. Around it are located the old fire station, the busy post office, the Co-op supermarket and a hair salon. In 2011 the post office campaigned successfully to remain open. In 2021 the fish and chip shop was taken over and refurbished by Seniors, a family-run chain of fish and chip shops on the Fylde Coast.

On Church Road is a popular community centre and nearby are the outdoor bowling club and the newly re-built Scout hut. The centre is used by, amongst others, Wesham Road Runners, Medlar and Wesham Town Council, Wesham Community Pride Trust and Blackpool and the Fylde College. It is also used as the town's electoral polling station. On Fleetwood Road there is a modern fire station and adjoining ambulance station.

The town also has a recreation field, equipped with a newly built skateboard park, on Fleetwood Road, where football is regularly played by local teams. The playground has recently been re-equipped with modern new play equipment and the perimeter of the field equipped with sturdy all-weather fitness stations. A doorstep green has recently been created on Derby Road near the former Fylde Borough Council offices. There are public allotments between St. Joseph's churchyard and the recreation ground and a public dog-walking area off Mowbreck Lane.

The town has three public houses – the Lane Ends, the Stanley Arms and the Royal Oak Hotel. There are three Biological Heritage Sites at Medlar Ditch, Medlar Meadows and Wesham Marsh.

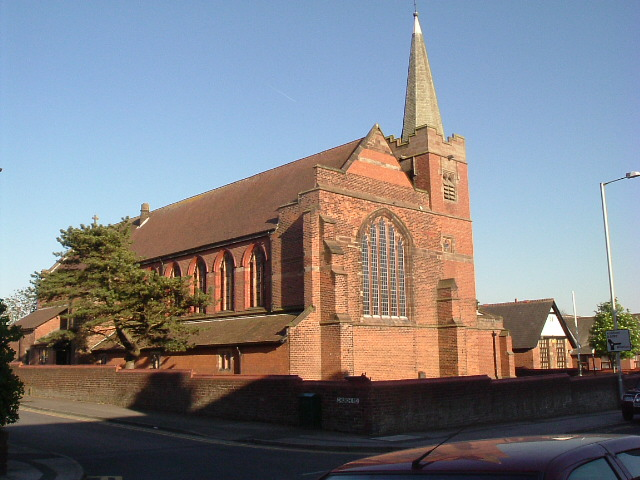
Christ Church, Wesham, founded in 1894

The town's annual Club Day is held in early June, jointly with Kirkham. The day involves the various churches and their chosen "Rose Queens", together with biblical tableau floats, civic dignitaries and brass bands, walking in procession through the town in the morning.

In January 2011, as part of a £6 million savings review by Blackpool Teaching Hospitals Trust, the purpose-built 40-bed rehabilitation unit for the elderly on Mowbreck Lane, which had been built in 2001, was closed. In 2020 work began by Lancashire and South Cumbria NHS Foundation Trust to convert the property to a new 28-bed mental health rehabilitation centre, a term used to describe care that helps people to live independently. The centre opened on 14 March 2022.

== Churches ==
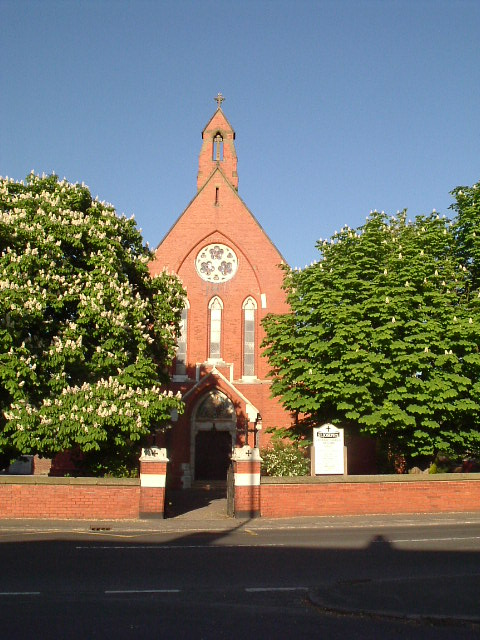
St Joseph's Church, Fleetwood Road

The town has two churches. Christ Church, Church of England, which is a Grade II listed building, was founded in 1894. The church has a graveyard and an affiliated junior school adjacent.

St Joseph's Roman Catholic was founded in 1885. The church also has a graveyard and an affiliated junior school adjacent, as well as an attached presbytery on Mowbreck Lane. The foundation stone for the church was laid, on 13 July 1884, by Bishop O'Reilly after two members of the local Billington family left funds for the construction of a Catholic church in Wesham. The church was consecrated and dedicated to St Joseph on 18 March 1886 in a large ceremony, led by Robert Cornthwaite, Bishop of Leeds. It was opened for the public on the following Sunday, 21 March 1886. In 2011 the parish was linked with that of St John the Evangelist's Church, Kirkham, and in 2013 the two joined to become a single parish, the Parish of the Holy Cross.

The Primitive Methodist chapel, located nearest to the small town square, was founded in 1895. In the 1970s the congregation joined with Kirkham. It has now been converted to private dwellings, but retains its main architectural features including foundation stones.

== Governance ==
Medlar-with-Wesham Town Council is responsible for supporting local events and community groups and managing assets such as the community centres, play areas, and noticeboards. It has seven councillors. The mayor is Councillor Liz Bickerstaffe and the town clerk is Ruth Ross. After a comprehensive questionnaire survey of all Wesham residents, a parish plan was published in November 2008.

In the 2023 local elections the two Fylde Borough Council seats were won by Liz Bickerstaffe (Independent) and Jordan Ledger (Labour Party).

In the 2025 local elections Joshua Roberts (Reform UK) was elected as the Lancashire County Council councillor for Fylde East.

== Urban development ==
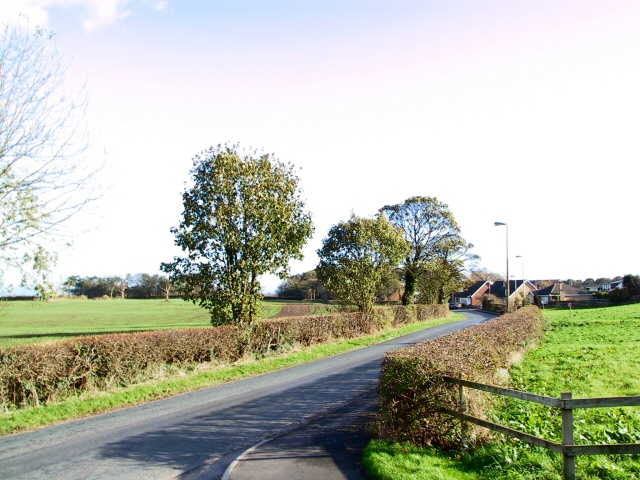
Mowbreck Lane, leading to Treales, in 2005

In recent years the town has seen three large housing developments: the first on greenfield land adjacent to the former Wesham Park Hospital (at which permission for 74 dwellings was granted only on appeal – "Alexandra Road"), the second with 208 houses on brownfield land at "Willow Fields" on part of the hospital site itself and a third with 109 houses at "Crossing Gates" on greenfield land between Fleetwood Road and Weeton Road.

In November 2013 local businessman David Haythornthwaite announced plans for a £12 million development of land at Mill Farm adjacent to the A585. The plan included a 6,000 capacity stadium for AFC Fylde, a Sports Science building, a full-sized football pitch, a full-sized hockey pitch, an industrial distribution centre, a hotel, an Aldi foodstore, a pub, a drive-through restaurant and a petrol filling station. A campaign group "Save Wesham and Kirkham" was formed to oppose the plan and a public meeting was arranged for 13 December, at Wesham Community Centre, to discuss the plan. Work began at the site in early 2015.

In 2023 plans for a new primary care centre and a care home on the former hospital site on Derby Road were taken forward, but as of May 2026 no further progress has been reported. Half of the site was later developed, by Danforth Care No. 1 Limited and Care UK Care Services Limited, with the opening of Pear Tree House care home.

In June 2026 a campaign was launched to stop a 128-house development, by De Pol Associates, on behalf of Northern Trust Land Ltd., on existing farm land. The proposed site is at Towns Hill, off Mowbreck Lane, east of Park Lane in Wesham. A public meeting, at Wesham Community Centre, was planned for 16 June.

== Sport ==
Mill Farm Sports Village is a multi-sport facility located on the outskirts of the town. Facilities include the Mill Farm football stadium, home to the football team AFC Fylde since 2016, and several 3G football and hockey pitches.

The town's football team AFC Fylde, formerly Kirkham and Wesham F.C., play in the National League (division), having been promoted from the National League North as they finished 1st in 2025 and promoted as Champions. On 11 May 2008 the team travelled to Wembley Stadium to challenge Lowestoft Town in the final for the FA Vase. They returned victorious. On 12 May there was a victory procession through the town, with the team on an open-top bus, from Kirkham Market Square to Wesham Fire Station and back again, followed by a celebratory party in the Kirkham Community Centre car park. Thousands of spectators lined the route to cheer home the victorious team.

AFC Fylde moved to their new ground, Mill Farm Sports Village, at the start of the 2016–17 National League North season, bringing the team back to Wesham after playing at Kellamergh Park, Warton, until the end of the 2015–16 season.

The town is also the home to Wesham FC, who compete in the Mid Lancashire Football League Division Two and Sunday league side Wesham Town FC.

== Listed buildings ==
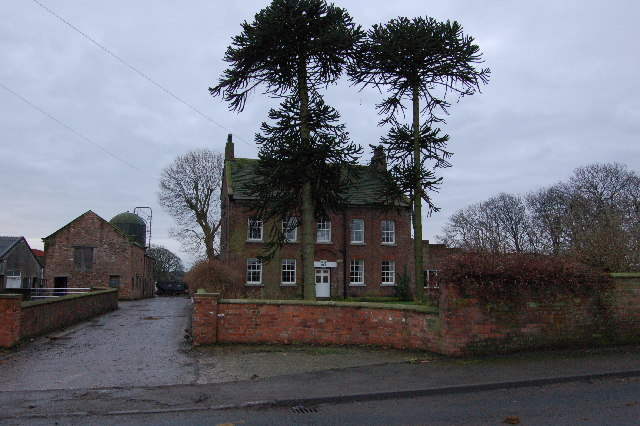
Bradkirk Hall Farmhouse, Weeton Road

The town has three buildings or structures which have Grade II Listed status:

- Bradkirk Hall Farmhouse, Weeton Road (bearing the date plaque EH:1754)
- Christ Church, Church Road
- War memorial with surrounding railings, Garstang Road South

== Transport and media ==
Regular bus services are provided by the Ribble branch of Stagecoach Buses. In March 2011 the railway station, which the town shares with Kirkham, was given a makeover with a major modernisation and refurbishment of the staircase. The town is served by its own free weekly newspaper, The Kirkham and Wesham Advertiser. The local daily newspapers are the Blackpool Gazette and Lancashire Evening Post.

Junction 3, which is situated in Medlar, serves the M55 motorway, which was opened in 1975.

== Gallery ==
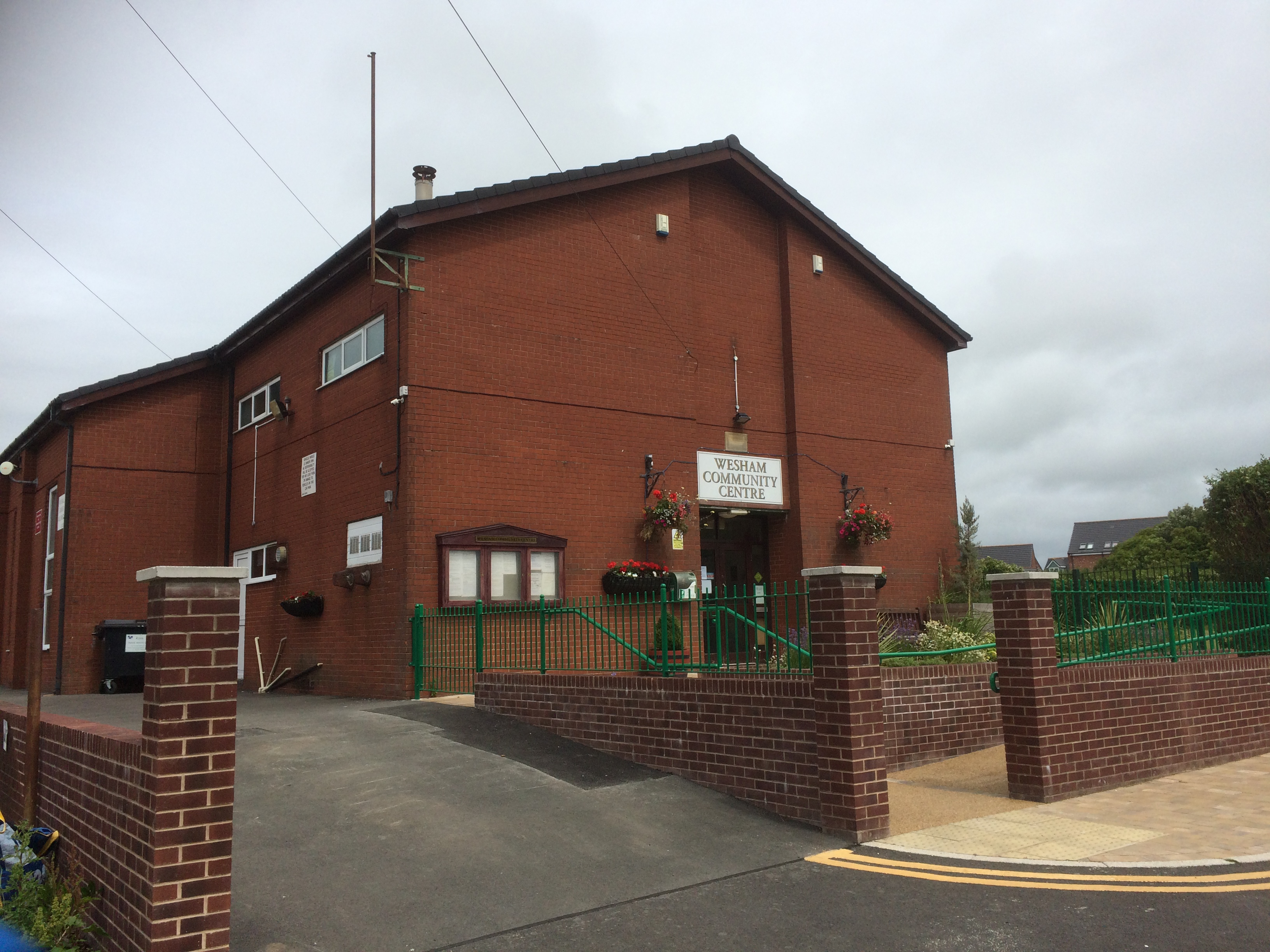
Community Centre

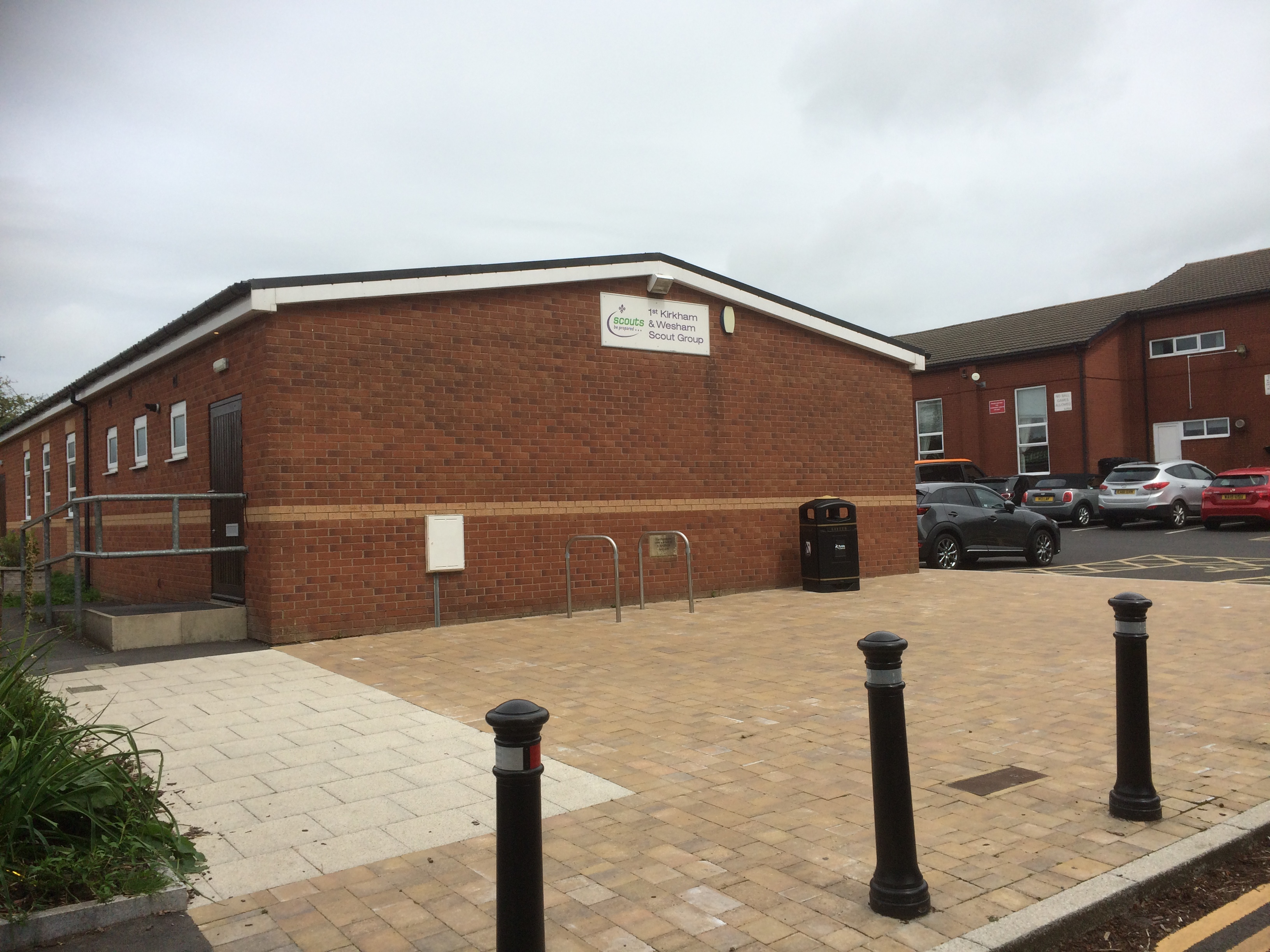
Scout hut

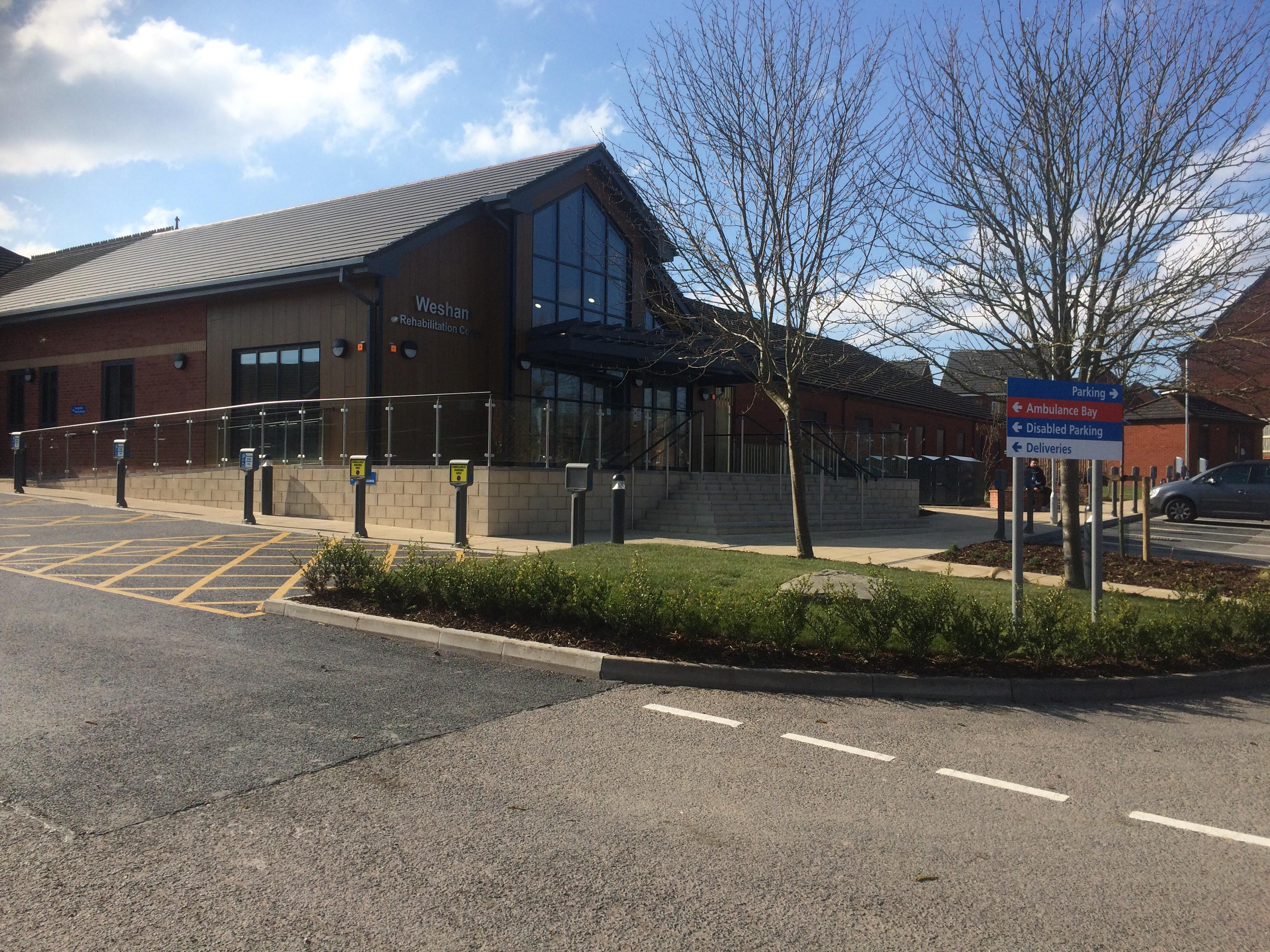
Wesham Rehabilitation Centre, March 2022
