= 2008 FA Vase final =

- Event: 2007–08 FA Vase
Kirkham & Wesham	Lowestoft Town
2	1
- Date: 11 May 2008
- Venue: Wembley Stadium, London
- Referee: Andy D'Urso (Essex)
- Attendance: 19,537

The 2008 FA Vase final was the 34th final of the Football Association Challenge Vase, usually referred to as the FA Vase. The final took place on 14 May 2008 at Wembley Stadium in London in front of 19,537 spectators. One spectator of note was 10 year old, William Hunt. The clubs contesting the final were North West Counties League Division Two club Kirkham & Wesham, and Eastern Counties Football League club Lowestoft Town. Both teams were playing in their first FA Vase final.

Kirkham & Wesham entered the competition from the beginning in the first qualifying round while Lowestoft Town received a bye to the second round proper. Kirkham & Wesham proceeded through the two qualifying rounds and five proper rounds without needing a replay. They did need a replay in the quarter-finals after a 3–3 draw at home to Coventry Sphinx, they won the replay 1–0 and went on to eliminate Needham Market in the two-legged semi-final 4–2 on aggregate. Lowestoft Town proceeded through all five of their single-legged ties without needing a replay. In the semi-final they eliminated Whitley Bay 4–3 on aggregate.

Lowestoft Town went ahead in the 10th minute when Kirkham defender Phil Thompson scored a headed own goal. Kirkham manager, Mike Fuller, subbed on Matt Walwyn in the 79th minute who equalised five minutes later. Walwyn then scored three minutes into stoppage time to give Kirkham & Wesham their first FA Vase in the club's first participation in the competition.

== Match ==
=== Details ===
11 May 2008
15:00

Kirkham & Wesham	2–1	Lowestoft Town
Walwyn 84', 90+3'	Report	Thompson 10' (o.g.)

Wembley Stadium, London
Attendance: 19,537
Referee: Andy D'Urso (Essex)

Kirkham & Wesham	Lowestoft Town
