= Treales, Roseacre and Wharles =

Civil parish in Lancashire, England

Coordinates: 53.804°N 2.844°W

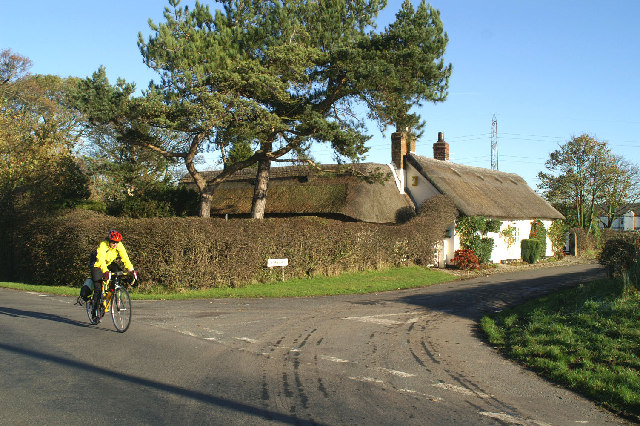
- Cross Lane, Moor Side

- Shown within Fylde Borough Shown on the Fylde Location within Lancashire
- Population: 492 (2011)
- OS grid reference: SD4434
- Civil parish: Treales, Roseacre and Wharles
- District: Fylde
- Shire county: Lancashire
- Region: North West
- Country: England
- Sovereign state: United Kingdom
- Post town: PRESTON
- Postcode district: PR4
- Dialling code: 01772
- Police: Lancashire
- Fire: Lancashire
- Ambulance: North West
- UK Parliament: Fylde

Treales, Roseacre and Wharles is a civil parish in the Borough of Fylde, Lancashire, England. It had a population of 492 at the 2011 Census. It lies 2 metres (6 ft 7 in) east of Kirkham and includes the villages of Bolton Houses, Moor Side, Roseacre (/ˈrɒzəkər/), Treales (/treɪlz/) and Wharles (/hwɔːr.ləz/).

== Treales ==
The village was called "Treueles" in the Domesday Book and "Turuel" in 1242. At the time of the Norman invasion of England, it was held by Earl Tostig. It later came into the possession of the Earl of Derby.

In Treales the Anglican parish church, Christ Church, is situated on Church Road. It was built in 1855 by Lord Stanley, when the Patron was the vicar of Kirkham. The church has its own benefice, but is part of the Deanery of Kirkham. The priest in charge is the Revd Canon Anne Beverley. The village has a windmill, now converted to a private dwelling.

The Derby Arms public house, situated on the corner of Kirkham Road and Church Road, has been designated a Grade II listed building since 9 June 1967. It was originally a farmhouse, dating from the early 18th century, with early 19th-century additions. It is now been closed for some years and was sold to local developer, Pete Marquis Developments, in 2020. The development plans would involve the listed element of the building being retained, but converted into a new use of a community shop with two flats above. More recent extensions would be removed and six new houses built on the site.

== Wharles ==
The village is called "Quarlous" in 1249 and "Warlawes" and "Werlows" in 1286.

Wharles is the venue for the annual Fylde Vintage and Farm Show, which takes place in a field next to the M55 motorway.

== Roseacre ==
The village is called "Rasaker" and "Raysakur" in 1249.

In February 2019, the government refused planning permission for fracking at Roseacre Wood. The application, by energy firm Cuadrilla, had been refused by the local council and was the subject of a public inquiry. Cuadrilla submitted three revised traffic routes, but Secretary of State James Brokenshire said "the proposed development would have a serious and very significant adverse impact on the safety of people using the public highway". He refused planning permission.

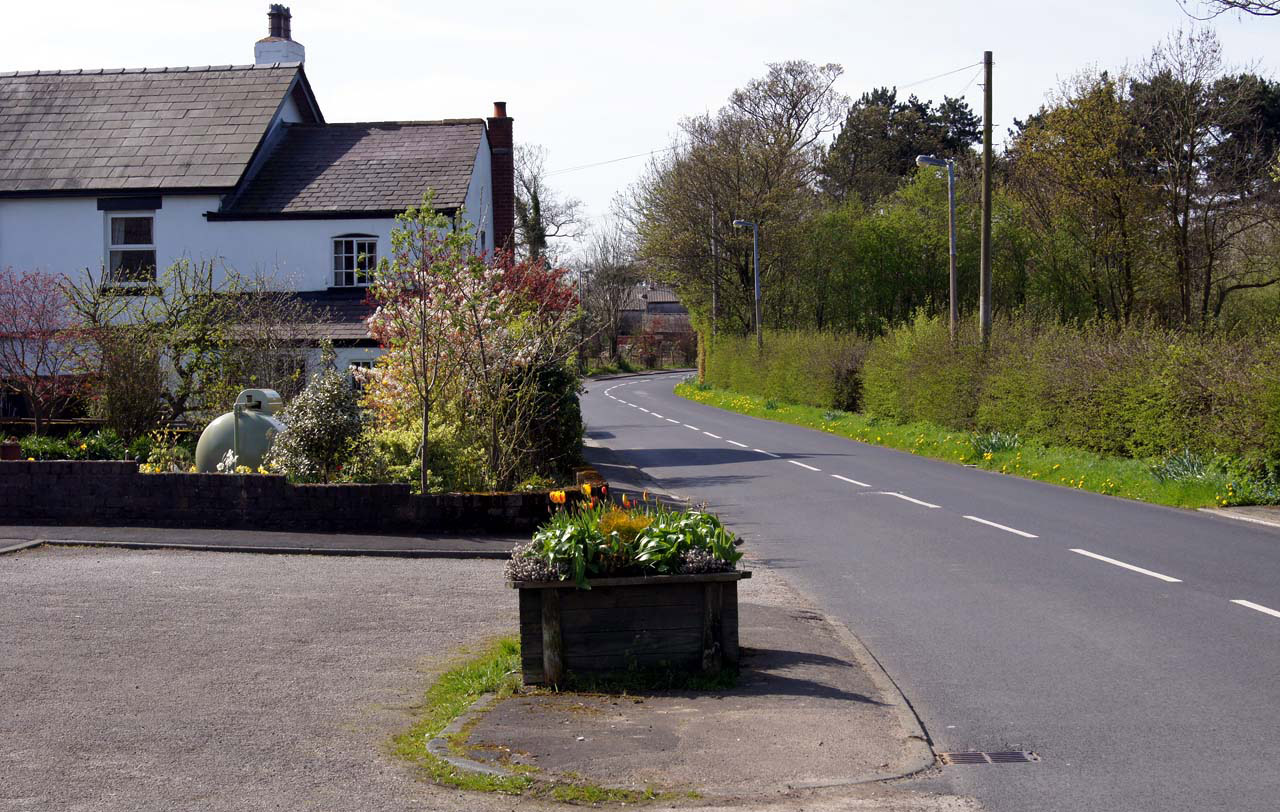
Treales village

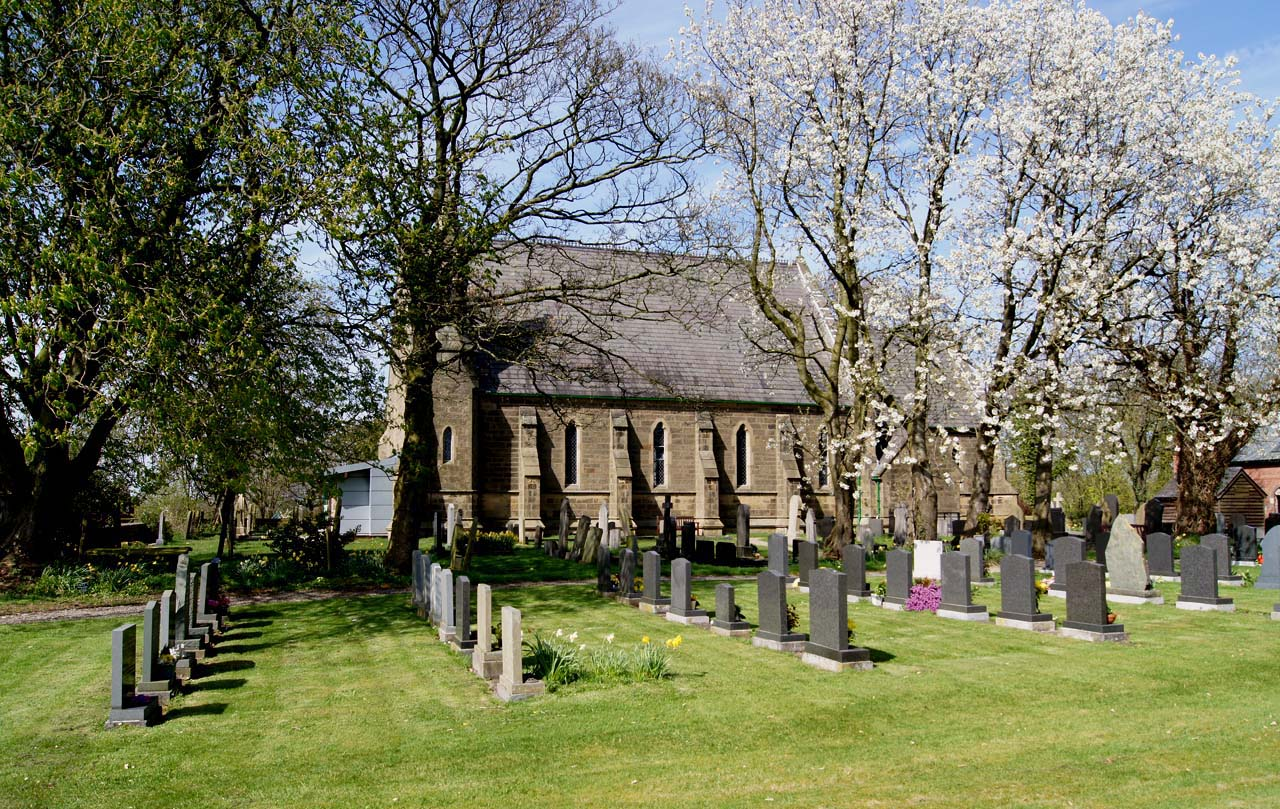
Christ Church, Treales

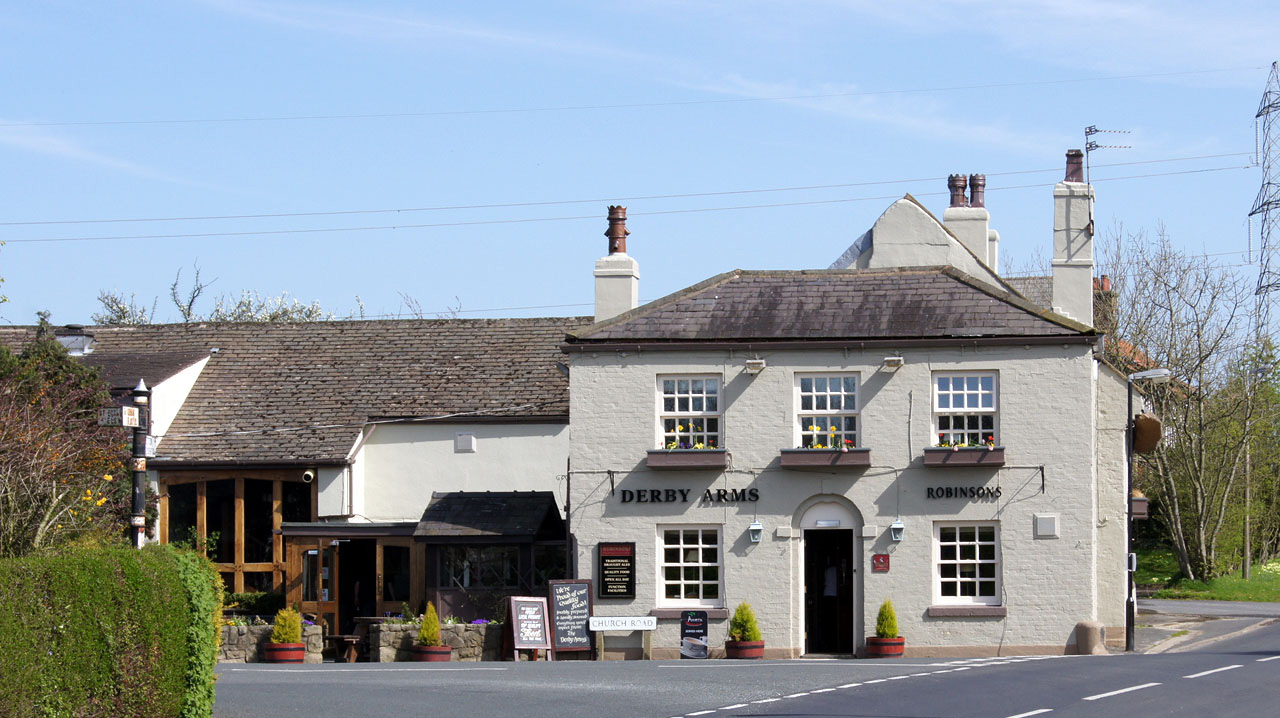
Derby Arms, Treales in 2011

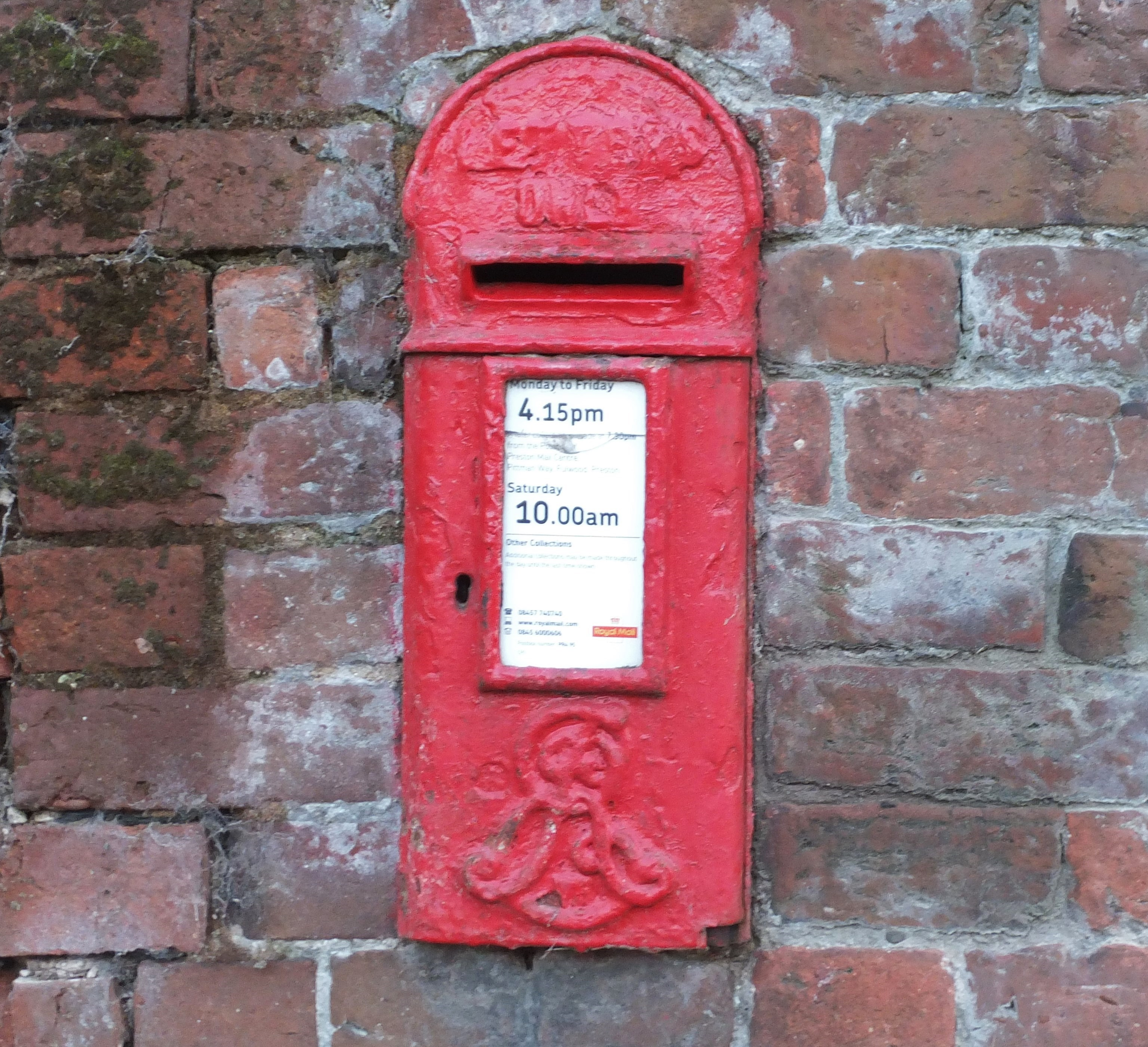
Edward VII letter box, Roseacre

== See also ==
- Listed buildings in Treales, Roseacre and Wharles
