= Pete Ravald =

British long-distance and fell runner (born 1944)

Peter Ravald (born 15 December 1944) is a British long-distance and fell runner. He held the Half Marathon world record and won Rivington Pike fell race.

Ravald broke Ron Hill’s world record for the half marathon in June 1966, by winning the Freckleton Half marathon in a time of 1:05:42.

But it is his local Rivington Pike fell race that Ravald is most proud of winning. In 1964 and 1967 Ravald had finished 3rd. In 1977 Ravald finished second between first placed Alan Blinston and Jeff Norman. Finally in 1979 he won the race.

In 2018 Ravald ran as an independent candidate in the Lever Park Ward for the Horwich Town Council election. He come a close second by only seven votes.

During his election campagne Ravald posted on the "Horwich first" community facebook page:

"Most Horwich residents may recognise me from my running career with Horwich RMI Harriers. I went on to represent Great Britain on road and track and managed to break Ron Hill’s world record for the half marathon in 1966. However this didn’t compare to the pride of winning the Pike Race in 1979 and becoming the first Horwich runner to ever win the race."

== Competition record ==
Year	Competition	Venue	Position	Event	Notes
Representing Horwich AC
1966	Freckleton Half Marathon	Freckleton, Lancashire	1st	Half Marathon	1:05:42
1964	Rivington Pike Fell Race	Rivington Pike, Lancashire	3rd	Fell race	18:46
1967	Rivington Pike Fell Race	Rivington Pike, Lancashire	3rd	Fell race	17:18
1977	Rivington Pike Fell Race	Rivington Pike, Lancashire	2nd	Fell race	16:42
1979	Rivington Pike Fell Race	Rivington Pike, Lancashire	1st	Fell race	17:03
