= Freckleton Air Disaster =

1944 bomber crash in England

Freckleton air disaster
- The aftermath of the Freckleton air disaster

Accident
- Date: 23 August 1944
- Summary: Loss of control. Precise cause unknown
- Site: Vicinity of Lytham Road, Freckleton, Lancashire, England; 53.75472°N 2.86585°W
- Total fatalities: 61

Aircraft
- Aircraft type: Consolidated B-24H-20CF Liberator
- Aircraft name: Classy Chassis II
- Operator: US Army Air Force
- Registration: 42-50291
- Flight origin: RAF Warton
- Destination: RAF Warton
- Occupants: 3
- Crew: 3 (pilot, co-pilot, flight engineer)
- Fatalities: 3
- Survivors: 0

Ground casualties
- Ground fatalities: 58 (38 children; 2 teachers; 7 civilians; 4 British servicemen; 7 American servicemen)

On 23 August 1944, a United States Army Air Forces (USAAF) Consolidated B-24H Liberator crashed during a test flight into the centre of the village of Freckleton, Lancashire, England, killing all three crewmen aboard the aircraft and 58 individuals on the ground, including 38 children aged four to six.

An official inquiry was unable to pinpoint an exact cause for the accident, although a sudden thunderstorm and the resultant reduced visibility immediately prior to the accident had caused the test pilot of the B-24H, First Lieutenant John Bloemendal, to be ordered to abandon the test flight and attempt to return to base. The report was unable to discount structural failure of the aircraft in such extreme weather conditions as a factor for the accident, and recommended that American pilots be warned how to respond to British thunderstorms.

This aviation accident would prove to be the deadliest to occur in Britain during World War II, and remained the second worst aviation accident in the world (in terms of number of fatalities) until the 1950 Llandow air disaster.

== Background ==
The year after the outbreak of World War II, the British Air Ministry announced plans to construct an aircraft factory and airfield close to the Lancashire village of Warton. The site was also intended to serve as a satellite airfield for the RAF Coastal Command station, based in Squires Gate, Blackpool, and for both economic and patriotic reasons, the decision to construct this airfield was welcomed by locals. This location was initially known as the Warton Air Depot, but became known in 1943 as Base Air Depot No. 2 (BAD-2).

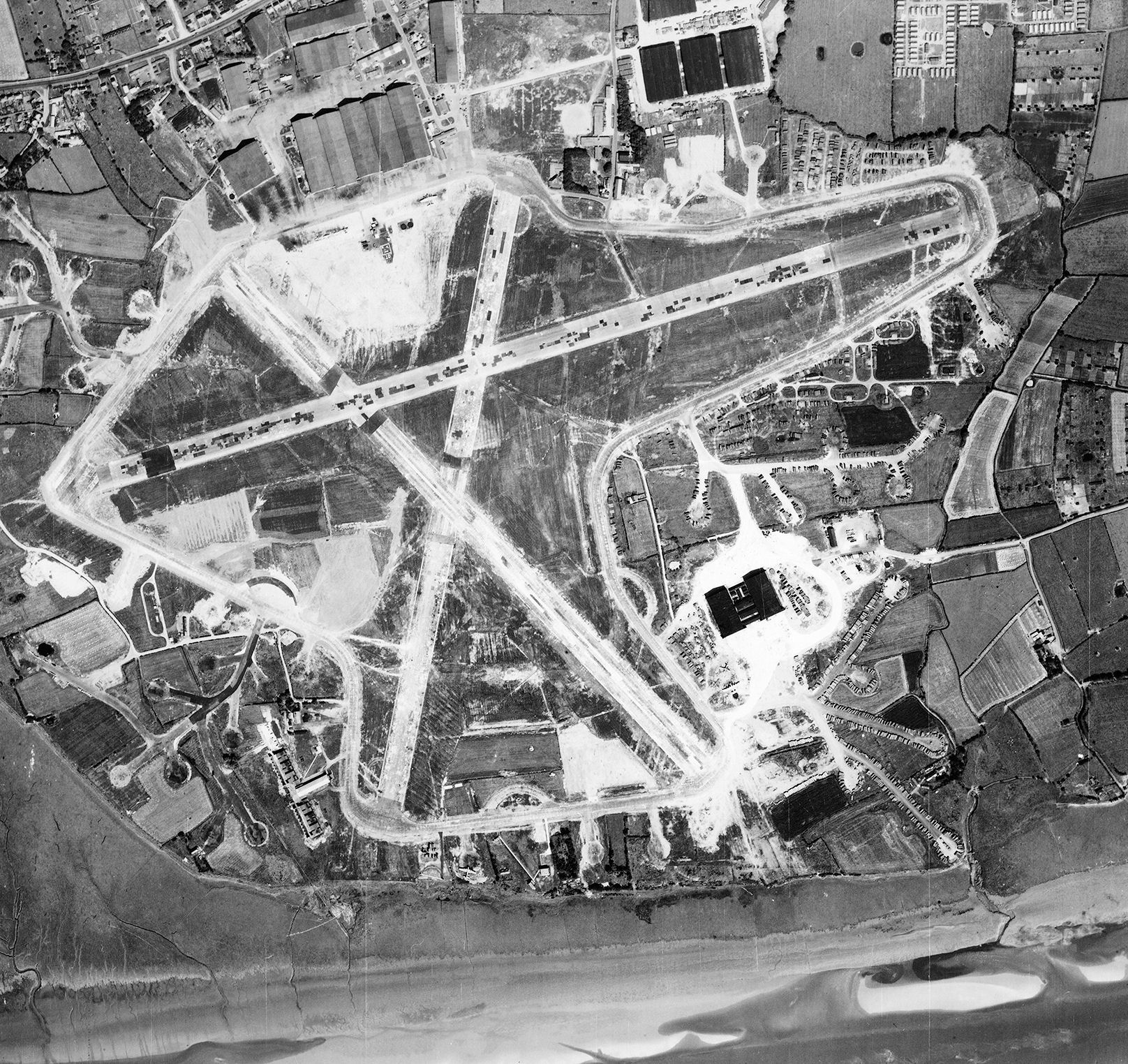
RAF Warton in 1945

The vicinity of the Fylde was spared any destruction during the 1940–41 Blitz air raids upon the United Kingdom. Following America's decision to enter World War II in December 1941, many assembled aircraft were initially transported into the UK via Atlantic shipping routes, at great risk, with significant delay, and with numerous losses. As such, the need for the Allies to identify strategic geographical locations to build and maintain aircraft within Britain to fight the Axis powers across Europe became increasingly apparent and urgent.

=== RAF Warton ===
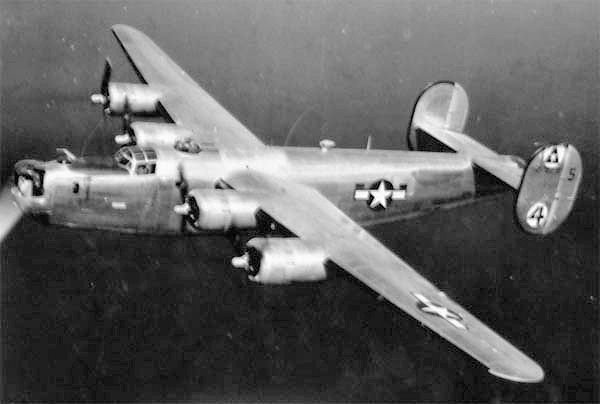
A Consolidated B-24 Liberator. Servicemen billeted at RAF Warton primarily constructed and modified this model of aircraft.

In January 1942, a decision was made for the United States Army Air Forces (USAAF) to operate RAF Warton as one of four air depots across the United Kingdom in order that aircraft could be assembled or modified, then tested prior to their active front line service elsewhere in Britain and locations such as continental Europe and the Mediterranean. RAF Warton was earmarked to primarily specialise in the construction, modification and maintenance of Consolidated B-24 Liberator aircraft in addition to performing modifications and repairs upon aircraft guns and flight instruments. The existing site was expanded, with numerous hangars, test sheds, a hospital and barracks constructed, and the three existing runways extended to accommodate the requirements of American military aircraft. These modifications saw the airbase significantly expand to encompass a large area in and around Warton and the neighbouring village of Freckleton. Despite some initial delays, the air depot was almost complete by the end of 1942. The first American servicemen to be stationed at RAF Warton arrived at the base on 18 August that year.

The Royal Air Force (RAF) officially handed all control of Warton Air Depot to the American military on 17 July 1943 in a ceremony which saw Lieutenant General Henry J. F. Miller formally accept control of the base from the RAF. Three months later, the base officially became known as Base Air Depot No. 2. Operational 24 hours a day by 1944, (Note: In anticipation of the Allies' planned Normandy landings, the work intake at BAD-2 increased in early 1944. For reasons of secrecy, all personnel of any rank at the airbase were not informed of the reasons for the increased production requirements.) over 10,000 aircraft, 38,400 aircraft guns, and 375,380 flight instruments would be processed at BAD-2 before the American military returned control of the site to the RAF in late 1945.

By 1944, approximately 10,400 American servicemen were deployed at BAD-2. The month of August alone saw approximately 80 aircraft fly to or from the airbase daily. In efforts to maintain the morale of the servicemen stationed at the base, celebrities, musicians and entertainers such as Glenn Miller, Joe Louis, Billy Conn and Mitzi Mayfair frequently visited the base to meet and entertain the troops.

=== Local relations ===
With a population slightly below 1,000, the adjacent village to the east of BAD-2, Freckleton, became colloquially known to servicemen and residents alike as 'Little America'. Relations between the American servicemen and locals were hospitable, and servicemen are known to have raised funds for the British Army, Navy and Air Force Relief Fund. Some servicemen also formed relationships with local women. On one occasion at Christmas 1943, Freckleton residents were invited to the base for a holiday party, where servicemen gave local children toys and American candy.

Several servicemen were known to spend off-duty hours socialising in and around the village, drinking in local pubs such as The Ship Inn and the Coach and Horses and visiting the amusements in nearby Blackpool. One popular location in Freckleton was the Sad Sack Snack Bar, which was a popular eatery with locals and both American and British servicemen. (Note: The American servicemen who frequented this cafè were based at BAD-2 in Warton (approximately 1.2 miles from the airbase). The British servicemen who frequented the premises were based in nearby Kirkham.) The Sad Sack Snack Bar was a converted garage on Lytham Road which had been reconstructed into a cafè. Named after a contemporary American comic book character, (Note: The comic book character Sad Sack is a generally inept, bumbling American civilian struggling to adjust to military life in World War II.) this eatery was owned and operated by locals Alan and Rachel Whittle and had been established to primarily cater to servicemen. The Whittles employed a small number of local women as waitresses and cooks. Their 15-year-old daughter, Pearl, also occasionally assisted her parents at the premises.

== Classy Chassis II ==
On 6 August 1944, another 25-ton Consolidated B-24 Liberator heavy bomber arrived at BAD-2 for repairs, refurbishment, inspection and subsequent test flights prior to intended return to active service. This particular aircraft was named the Classy Chassis II and featured nose art depicting a scantily clad brunette sitting upon a cloud, glancing backwards and suggestively smiling while unfastening her bra. The USAAF serial number of this aircraft was 42-50291. (Note: The practice of adorning military aircraft in World War II with nose art was never officially approved by the USAAF, but was not dissuaded as senior personnel believed the practice to boost the morale of servicemen.)

Constructed in Fort Worth, Texas, at the beginning of the year by Consolidated Aircraft, this aircraft featured unique changes in both the nose turret and tail turret from the standard model, which affected the centre of gravity of the aircraft. The Classy Chassis II had seen action in occupied France with the 486th Bombardment Group that summer; attacking strategic German strongholds such as airbases. The necessary repairs to be conducted at BAD-2 included flak damage. However, all requested refurbishments were completed by 22 August. That afternoon, Corporal Roy Lewis completed all the necessary paperwork pertaining to the repairs and refurbishment of the aircraft. Cpl. Lewis also performed all required pre-flight inspections. The paperwork relating to these inspections indicated the fuel tanks of the Classy Chassis II were filled to capacity with 2,793 gallons of aviation fuel.

The Classy Chassis II, pictured with her original crew months before the Freckleton air disaster

=== Test flight ===
At approximately 10:36 on the morning of 23 August 1944, two newly refurbished B-24 aircraft departed Base Air Depot No. 2 on scheduled test flights prior to their intended delivery to the Eighth Air Force. The pilots chosen to conduct these test flights were 27 and 28-year-old first lieutenants, John Allen Bloemendal and Peter Manassero. Both men were experienced test pilots, with Lt. Bloemendal—who had enlisted in the USAAF in March 1942—having accrued over 740 hours' service as a test pilot at BAD-2. Over 250 of these hours had been accrued as he flew B-24 aircraft. Lieutenant Bloemendal was selected to pilot the Classy Chassis II.

This test flight had originally been scheduled for 8.30 a.m. However, immediately prior to all crew boarding their aircraft, Lt. Bloemendal, as officer of the day, received a phone call informing him he was needed elsewhere on base. As such, a decision was made for the test flights to be postponed for two hours.

Both pilots flew their B-24s north from the base at an altitude of approximately 1,500 feet for approximately five minutes before Lt. Bloemendal informed Lt. Manassero of a cloud formation to their south-southeast. Lt. Manassero would later recollect the formation was "a very impressive sight," reminiscent of a "thunderhead". Almost simultaneously, staff at BAD-2 were informed via a weather station based at Burtonwood of a violent storm incoming from the direction of Warrington. In response, Lieutenant Colonel William Britton contacted the control tower, ordering the two airborne craft to land "at once". Both pilots—approximately four-and-a-half miles from base—were then ordered to land their B-24 aircraft on runway 08 at the airfield at 10.41 a.m., with both pilots being informed the runway was clear for their landings. Both aircraft descended to a distance of approximately 500 feet and approached the runway with lowered landing gear minutes later.

== Thunderstorm ==
By the time the pilots had returned to the vicinity of the airfield, however, the sky around Freckleton had significantly darkened. Sounds of thunder and streaks of lightning were also observed from the control tower at BAD-2 and by local residents. One child within Freckleton's Holy Trinity School would later recollect: "The sky [suddenly became] black and blue. Every colour you could think of." (Note: In 2019, an eight-year-old survivor of the Freckleton air disaster named Nellie Suddell would reflect: "I have never known a day, before or since, to go from daylight to total darkness in such a short space of time ... it was like night, and all the classroom lights had been turned on. Some children were becoming distressed [and] I remember Miss Rawcliffe telling everyone to rest their heads on their desks and close their eyes.") To dispel the fear of the pupils in the infants' classroom, teachers Jennie Hall and Louisa Hulme encouraged the children to sing nursery rhymes with them. Teachers within classrooms containing slightly older children attempted to distract their pupils with activities such as reading poetry and reviewing times tables. The headteacher of the school, a Mr. Billington, instructed a 13-year-old pupil, Jackie Nichol, to check each of the school's cloakrooms and classrooms to ensure all windows were closed.

Ray Cox, a Freckleton resident walking along Lytham Road, sought refuge from the torrential rain which had also begun to fall by running to an enclosed bus stop across the road from the Sad Sack Snack Bar. Cox later stated the sudden rain was so intense he was unable to see the cafè or any other buildings located across the road. Sudden winds in the vicinity of Freckleton also switched from a northeasterly direction to a southwesterly one and back within a matter of minutes. All these factors significantly reduced the pilots' visibility to approximately 500 yards and lowered the aeronautic ceiling to approximately 400 feet. (Note: Contemporary newspaper reports detail wind velocities approaching 60 mph (100 km/h). These winds are known to have uprooted trees and chicken coops. Flash flooding was also reported in nearby Southport and Blackpool.)

While Lt. Bloemendal and Lt. Manassero were flying in formation and approaching the airfield and runway 08, Lt. Bloemendal reported to the control tower that he was aborting his attempt to land upon the runway, and while raising his landing gear would perform a go-around. (Note: Bloemendal was the first pilot to depart from BAD-2 and the first to attempt to land upon runway 08.) Instead of landing, Lt. Manassero opted to fly his B-24 north to escape the storm. He would fly for almost ten miles with his aircraft barely above tree canopies before he was able to regain a safe altitude. Shortly afterwards, and out of sight of Lt. Manassero's aircraft, Lt. Bloemendal crashed into the village of Freckleton, northeast of the airfield.

=== Aviation accident ===
After contacting the control tower, Lt. Bloemendal—flying at a low altitude and with reduced visibility—began struggling against violent turbulence. In an effort to gain altitude, he ordered his co-pilot, 24-year-old Technical Sergeant James Manuel Parr, to increase the speed of the B-24. His aircraft then severed the top of a tree before the right wing of the B-24 clipped the corner of an unoccupied building as the wings of the aircraft were positioned almost vertical. This impact severed the tip of the wing, which ploughed along the ground and through a hedge.

The fuselage of the B-24—still airborne—continued, partly demolishing two further unoccupied houses and further disintegrating. The main wheel, tail turret and other debris of the disintegrating aircraft then ploughed into and through the Sad Sack Snack Bar—instantly killing 14 of the 20 staff and customers inside the premises—before sliding across Lytham Road, having burst into flames. The nose turret, engines, fuel tanks, and other debris from the aircraft then collided into the infants' wing of the Holy Trinity School, rupturing, igniting and engulfing pupils and teachers alike with highly flammable aviation fuel as the remainder of the aircraft, containing the three crewmen, crashed to the ground and somersaulted down Lytham Road. The clock upon the wall of the infants' classroom of Holy Trinity School stopped at 10.47 a.m.

When Lt. Manassero had successfully cleared the thunderstorm, he attempted to initiate radio contact with Lt. Bloemendal, to no avail. The control tower at BAD-2 also unsuccessfully attempted to initiate contact before quickly receiving reports that an aircraft had crashed in Freckleton.

=== Rescue efforts ===
In the minutes immediately following the accident, many children aged seven and older began to panic and run from the school. Some, such as seven-year-old Patricia Grafton, ran out of the back door to safety. She recalled a large burning beam and smoldering bricks from the school chimney narrowly missing her as she ran. Other children ran in the direction of the school playground, only to be trapped very close to burning debris because the school gate was locked and the playground wall was too high to scale.

Numerous policemen, locals and multiple American servicemen immediately proceeded to the location of the accident in an effort to locate survivors as others made emergency calls to the National Fire Service. The first emergency responders to arrive at the scene of the accident were crews from the BAD-2 fire service. These responders arrived at approximately 10.48 a.m., although approximately ten minutes would elapse before any national emergency responders arrived at the scene. Several servicemen quickly scaled the six-foot wall of the school playground to hoist panicking children fleeing from the largely undamaged junior classrooms to safety.

All rescuers' efforts quickly became coordinated, with the local Methodist church becoming an impromptu command post. As debris from the demolished aircraft and buildings blocked access to the main water supply necessary to combat the fire, approximately 50 servicemen carried a trailer pump over the debris, then pushed the trailer to nearby Balderstone Mill, where they connected the pump to the local water supply.

Initially, the bodies of the children killed outright in the disaster were taken to the storage room of the nearby Coach and Horses pub, which was used as a temporary morgue prior to their identification by next of kin. Several badly injured RAF and American servicemen recovered from the ruins of the cafè were quickly transported to the base hospital at RAF Warton. The headteacher of the Holy Trinity School himself received severe burns to his hands as he removed debris from the ruins of the infants' wing of the school in his efforts to locate survivors. He was assisted in his efforts by several British and American servicemen; these rescue efforts saw seven children and two teachers pulled alive from the burning rubble of the school, although one of these teachers, 20-year-old Jennie Hall, would die of her injuries within hours of her rescue. All survivors recovered from the school were promptly transported to the American military hospital, although six of these individuals would also succumb to their injuries over the following two weeks.

All fire crews and civilian rescuers remained at the scene until 7 p.m., when the fires had been extinguished and any hope of finding further survivors of the accident was lost. With the assistance of searchlights, many American and British servicemen continued clearing the rubble from the crash site throughout the night.

== Casualties ==
Fifty-one people (the three crew members on the B-24, 34 children, six American servicemen, one RAF airman, six staff at the Sad Sack Snack Bar and a 15-year-old boy within the cafè) died almost instantly, with 10 others (four children, two teachers, an American serviceman and three RAF airmen) later dying in hospital from their injuries. Although several thousand aviation accidents involving American aircraft—both minor and major—occurred during World War II, this aviation accident would prove to be the most catastrophic.

Almost five per cent of the village's population died in the Freckleton air disaster. Seven of the child victims were either first or second cousins to one other. Three others were evacuees from Greater London who had been relocated to Freckleton to protect them from German air raids. Only one of these three evacuees survived. Several children who escaped from the relatively unscathed junior classrooms struggled with survivor guilt throughout their lives. One of these individuals was Jackie Nichol, who had just begun to open the door to the infants' classroom to ensure all windows were closed when fuel and other debris collided into the classroom. Nichol observed a "blinding orange flash" and a fireball immediately spread across the ceiling as teacher Louisa Hulme, standing close to the classroom door, became "engulfed in flames". Nichol's own lungs briefly deflated as the fire rapidly consumed the oxygen within the classroom.

Only two of the servicemen recovered from the ruins of the Sad Sack Snack Bar, RAF airmen William Bone and Ray Brooke, survived their injuries. They and three children recovered from the infants' classroom of the Holy Trinity School—George Carey, Ruby Whittle and David Madden—were the only survivors of the aviation accident. All five casualties endured multiple operations spanning—in some cases—several years, but all survived their injuries. (Note: Singer and entertainer Bing Crosby visited those injured in the Freckleton air disaster on 1 September. Survivor Ruby Whittle would later recollect Crosby was reduced to tears upon attempting to sing for the injured children—retreating to the hallway outside the children's ward. Crosby sang songs such as "White Christmas" and "Don't Fence Me In" from the hallway for the children.)

=== Funerals ===
Many of the civilians killed in the Freckleton air disaster were buried in a communal grave within the Holy Trinity Churchyard in two separate services held on the afternoon of 26 August. The services were officiated by the vicar of the parish, with assistance from the chaplain of BAD-2. The American military provided coffins for all the deceased and covered all expenses for the ceremonies.

Personnel from RAF Warton served as the guard of honour for the funeral processions and as pallbearers for the children's coffins, which were carried in a procession from the ruins of the school and through the village to the Holy Trinity Church, where services were held prior to their interment in a communal grave in the village churchyard dug by American servicemen in the shape of a letter T. Four of the servicemen selected to act as pallbearers specifically requested to carry the coffins of two children they had befriended in the village.

Contemporary reports indicate the streets lining the funeral processions were filled with mourners standing up to six deep. Two further children to succumb to their injuries—6-year-old Beryl Hogarth and 5-year-old Joseph Threlfall—and 64-year-old teacher Louisa Lee Hulme, all of whom died on 25 August, were also later buried in the communal grave. (Note: Prior to succumbing to her injuries, Louisa Hulme had specifically expressed her wish to be buried alongside her students to both hospital staff and visitors. She had been due to retire one week after the tragedy.) The final fatality of the accident was 6-year-old Maureen Denise Clarke, who succumbed to her injuries on the afternoon of 4 September. Clarke was also buried within the communal grave.

The four British servicemen killed in the disaster were buried in separate cemeteries across England and the Isle of Man. The ten American servicemen killed in the disaster were initially buried at the Cambridge American Cemetery and Memorial. At the request of their families, the bodies of six of these servicemen were repatriated to America following the war. The four American servicemen killed in the Freckleton air disaster to remain buried upon British soil are Sergeant Theodore Edwin Nelson, Sergeant Frank Louis Zugel, Corporal Arthur James Rogney, and Private Minas Philip Glitsis. Three of these men worked in the maintenance division of BAD-2, and one within the base complement squadron.

== Military investigation ==
A coroner's inquest into the accident began on 25 August, and concluded on 8 September. This inquest ruled all the fatalities died by misadventure. On the date of the coroner's verdicts, the results of an official military investigation into the aviation accident were received by the USAAF. The USAAF had appointed Major Charles Himes to oversee their official investigation into the accident, and he had concluded his investigation on 26 August, having interviewed several eyewitnesses and received statements from air traffic control, the station weather officer, and Lt. Manassero. Major Himes was the chief test pilot stationed at RAF Warton at the time of the accident and had been acquainted with Lt. Bloemendal, having flown several missions with him.

The official report into the Freckleton air disaster concluded that the precise cause of the crash was unknown. The possibility of structural failure of the aircraft in the extreme conditions was not discounted, (Note: The almost complete destruction of the aircraft in the accident had precluded any meaningful forensic investigation into the structure of the B-24.) although Major Himes emphasised in his final report that Lt. Bloemendal had not fully realised the danger the incoming storm posed until he was into his final approach, by which time he had insufficient altitude and speed to manoeuvre, given the probable strength of the downdraughts that had ensued.

Noting that at least two eyewitnesses maintained that the Classy Chassis II had been struck by a bolt of lightning at the juncture of the right wing and fuselage moments before the crash, and that many American pilots deployed to the UK commonly believed that British storms were little more than showers, the report recommended that all American pilots gaining flying experience in England should be "emphatically warned" of the dangers of British thunderstorms, and the perils of flying into or beneath them.

=== Scrutiny of findings ===
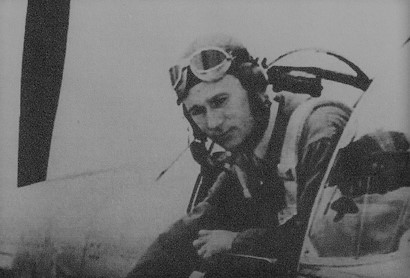
First Lieutenant John Allen Bloemendal, pictured inside a P-51 Mustang at BAD-2, circa 1944.

Some individuals have criticised the findings within this report as being an effort to use Lt. Bloemendal as a scapegoat for the tragedy. These individuals have stated that although the report does contain testimony indicating that both pilots had initially been instructed to land upon runway 08 despite the fact the aeronautic ceiling and visibility were rapidly decreasing around the airfield and that both pilots had not been advised by the control tower to instead fly north towards Scotland to escape the storm until after Lt. Bloemendal had already crashed, Major Himes had concluded the most likely reason for the accident was Lt. Bloemendal's "error in the judgement of the violence of the storm".

The official report does not hold any inference to the failure of Lt. Col. Britton or the Warton control tower personnel to actually warn Lieutenants Bloemendal and Manassero against descending below the incoming storm until both planes had done so. Nor does the report highlight the fact Lt. Col. Britton had no experience as a pilot, and that the control tower were in possession of weather reports from Burtonwood which clearly illustrated the ferocity of the storm. The weather officer, a Captain Zdrubek, had informed investigators that, although the storm had been short in duration, it had been the most severe ever recorded at BAD-2. Furthermore, Lt. Manassero had also informed Major Himes of his opinion the storm was too severe for even "the most experienced" of pilots to navigate, that he himself did not have full control of his own aircraft while "in the grip" of the storm, and that he and his crew had been fortunate to find ground almost level and with no insurmountable obstructions until they were able to regain a sufficient altitude and fly clear.

"If Bloemendal and Manassero had taken their aircraft aloft at 8.30 a.m., there would not have been an accident. Thirty-eight children would have reached adulthood and the promise of their potential. Ten American and four British servicemen would have returned to the happiness, love, and security of their families after the war. The Sad Sack Snack Bar might have remained a popular fixture in post-war Freckleton. One teacher would have retired while another began a rewarding career ... When lives are measured in years, who would have thought two brief hours would be so important?"

— James Hedtke. Author of The Freckleton, England, Air Disaster, reflecting on the fateful decision at BAD-2 to postpone the 23 August 1944 test flights by two hours. 2014.

== Aftermath ==
Twenty-nine American servicemen stationed at BAD-2 lost their lives on active service at or close to the base between 1944 and 1945, over a third of whom died in the Freckleton air disaster. A civilian contractor and a local cyclist would also die in accidents upon or close to the base in incidents involving BAD-2 personnel. However, for many, the aviation accident of 23 August 1944 would remain the most paramount and painful memory of their active service at BAD-2.

In the months following the accident, the 10,400 American servicemen stationed at BAD-2 raised over $44,000 (the equivalent of about $810,300, or £600,900, as of 2026) in donations to the Freckleton Memorial Fund. All the money was donated to local authorities to fund a memorial in honour of the victims of the tragedy.

An area of land close to the scene of the accident was selected to be converted into a memorial garden and children's playground in memory of those lost in the disaster. The money used to fund the construction of this memorial garden and playground was raised by American servicemen, approximately 600 of whom devoted their off-duty hours to build the playground. This garden and playground were formally dedicated on 20 August 1945. Over 2,000 civilians and servicemen were present at this dedication ceremony. At the conclusion of the ceremony, the base commander of BAD-2 unveiled a seven-ton stone monument bearing a commemorative bronze plaque at the site. The plaque reads: "This playground presented to the children of Freckleton by their neighbours of Base Air Depot No. 2 USAAF in recognition and remembrance of their common loss in the disaster of August 23rd 1944."

The number of American servicemen stationed at BAD-2 gradually decreased in the months following the Freckleton air disaster, as several personnel were redeployed to serve in active combat. Approximately 1,700 men had been transferred to frontline combat units by late-March 1945, although production at the base continued unabated.

On 8 May, the BAD-2 base commander informed servicemen that the war in Europe was officially over, although the Allies were still fighting the Japanese in the Pacific, and the base's efforts were therefore still required. The Eighth Air Force officially closed BAD-2 on 1 September, returning control of the base to the RAF. Some servicemen briefly remained stationed at the base to dispose of supplies and property while others undertook eight-week training courses in marketable skills prior to their return to the United States. The final American personnel stationed at the base left in February 1946. (Note: One of the servicemen to leave BAD-2 following the end of World War II was Lt. Peter Manassero. He died in a plane crash in Roswell, New Mexico in May 1949 at the age of 33.)

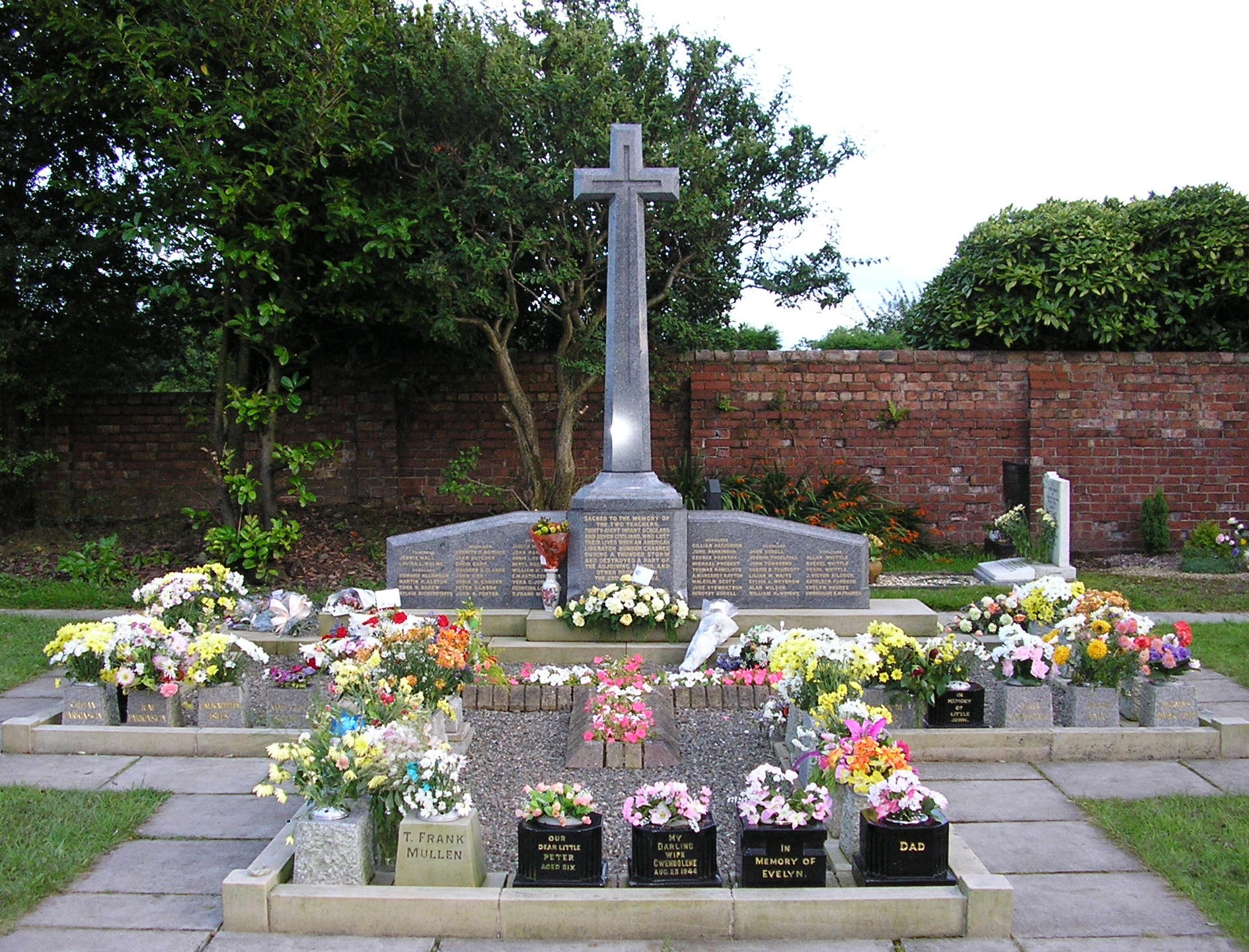
The official monument to the Freckleton air disaster, erected behind the communal grave in 1947

The community of Freckleton later erected an official monument to those killed in the air disaster directly behind the communal grave dug by American servicemen within Freckleton's Holy Trinity Churchyard. The necessary funds to pay for this memorial were raised by the families and friends of those killed. This stone monument was dedicated on 24 May 1947, and resembles an aircraft that has crashed to the earth with its nose section buried in the ground. The elevated cross at the centre of the edifice resembles the tail section, rear wings, and rear fuselage section of the aircraft, with the main section of fuselage represented by the centre panel at the base of the structure. This centre panel contains an inscription of remembrance to the disaster and the lives lost. The names of all the civilians killed in the disaster are inscribed upon the two sloped side panels, believed to symbolise the plane's wings.

By 1961, the population of Freckleton had increased to over 3,300. The results of the most recent census published in the United Kingdom lists the population of Freckleton as 6,019 inhabitants.

The village of Freckleton commemorates the air disaster on each anniversary of the tragedy. These memorial services are held at the village's Holy Trinity Church. Residents past and present have never held ill-feelings towards the personnel stationed at BAD-2 for the disaster; all have appreciated the fact the incident was a tragic wartime accident which impacted numerous families on both sides of the Atlantic.

Several American servicemen stationed at BAD-2 in 1944 have attended these local memorial services, including the service held to commemorate the 50th anniversary of the disaster in 1994. This particular anniversary saw several hundred former servicemen attend the ceremony, and concluded with local schoolchildren singing Dame Vera Lynn's wartime song "We'll Meet Again".

In the decades since the tragedy, several commemorative reunions have also been held in America. These events have been attended by British military personnel, Freckleton locals and two of the three surviving children from the infants' wing of Holy Trinity School (George Carey and Ruby Whittle). In addition, several individuals are known to have formed lifelong transatlantic friendships, and attendees to these events have thanked American serving medical and military personnel for their responsive, diligent and compassionate response to the aviation disaster.

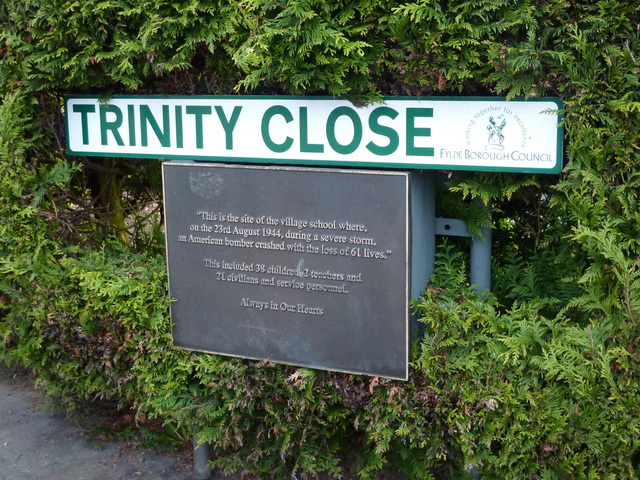
The plaque unveiled at the site of the Holy Trinity School in May 2007

Repairs to the Holy Trinity School were completed on 30 October 1944, although the destroyed infants' classroom was never reconstructed. The school was demolished in 1979 and a more modern primary school later constructed at the site. An official memorial plaque was placed at the former site of the Holy Trinity School on 2 May 2007. This plaque was unveiled by two local children, one of whom, 11-year-old Mary Thompson, was the great-great-niece of survivor Ruby Whittle.

In the years and decades following the tragedy, some four hundred books detailing American history and Freckleton's links with the American military were donated to the Freckleton library by former American servicemen stationed at BAD-2 at the time of the disaster, many of which contained messages of condolence.

The garden of the National Museum of the Mighty Eighth Air Force in Pooler, Georgia, contains a stone monument memorial to those lost in the Freckleton air disaster. The ceremony for the 1997 dedication of this 25-foot memorial commenced at the precise time the Classy Chassis II was scheduled to commence its test flight from BAD-2. An individual serving as a secretary at RAF Warton at the time of the aviation accident, Sergeant Ralph Scott, delivered a speech at the dedication ceremony for this memorial stone. In this speech, Scott referenced the ages, genders and nationalities of all those lost in the disaster and the sacrifices of all Allied nations in their mutual desire to defeat fascism, stating: "They shall not grow old as we have done and we shall remember them as they were: young men; young women; and small children" who had been lost at a time of international conflict fought "to assure our present-day freedoms".

Several decades after the tragedy, Sergeant Scott would reflect: "You knew the nature of war; you were prepared mentally for the fact that you were going to lose comrades. But none of us considered that five-year-old children could get killed. That's something that you never forget."

== Media ==
=== Bibliography ===
- Hedtke, James R. (2014). The Freckleton, England, Air Disaster: The B-24 Crash that Killed 38 Preschoolers and 23 Adults. August 23, 1944. Jefferson, North Carolina: McFarland Publishing. ISBN 978-0-786-47841-5. (Google Books preview of pages 1-17.)

=== Television ===
- The Freckleton Air Disaster: 80 Years On (2024). This 25-minute documentary was first broadcast by Shots!TV in October 2024 and features interviews with survivors Ruby Currell and David Madden.

== See also ==
- List of accidents and incidents involving military aircraft
- List of aircraft accidents and incidents by number of ground fatalities

== Cited works and further reading ==
- Bowman, Martin W. (2015). We Were Eagles Volume Three: The Eighth Air Force at War June to October 1944. Stroud, Gloucestershire: Amberley Publishing. ISBN 978-1-445-63382-4.
- Ellis, John (2013). Blackpool at War: A History of the Fylde Coast During the Second World War. Cheltenham, Gloucestershire: History Press. ISBN 978-0-750-95176-0.
- Gero, David (1999). Military Aviation Disasters: Significant Losses Since 1908. Yeovil, Somerset: Patrick Stephens Limited. ISBN 978-1-852-60574-2.
- Hedtke, James R. (2014). The Freckleton, England, Air Disaster: The B-24 Crash that Killed 38 Preschoolers and 23 Adults. August 23, 1944. Jefferson, North Carolina: McFarland Publishing. ISBN 978-0-786-47841-5
- Holmes, Harry (1998). The World's Greatest Air Depot: The US 8th Air Force at Warton 1942-1945. Lancaster: Airlife. ISBN 978-1-853-10969-0.
- Procter, Angela (2023). Children of the Storm: A Family Story of Loss and Love in Wartime Britain. London: Independently Published. ISBN 979-8-860-57184-6.
- Shakeshaft, Peter (2001). The History of Freckleton. Lancaster: Carnegie Publishing. ISBN 978-1-859-36084-2.
- Turner, Joyce (2007). The Freckleton Tragedy, 1944. Blackpool: Landy Publishing. ISBN 978-1-872-89577-2.
- Valant, Gary (2002). Vintage Aircraft Nose Art. Beverly, Massachusetts: Voyageur Press. ISBN 978-0-760-31208-7.
