= BAE Warton Rugby =

BAE Warton RUFC is a rugby club based in Warton, Fylde, England.

== History ==
The Club originally appeared as a Wednesday side running for a while in the 1980s, using players from surrounding clubs, and playing mid-week social games. BAE Warton RUFC in its own right was formed in 1992. The club was affiliated to the RFU in 1992 and went on to join the then Courage League in 1994, playing in division Lancs North Two. Though not without its successes in the league, the club was forced to withdraw from the Courage league following the 1996/1997 season, when injuries and lack of depth to the squad were preventing the club competing at the required level. For the 1997/1998 season the club resumed with a schedule of friendly games against junior sides (with one or two exceptions) at clubs throughout Lancashire, Greater Manchester and Cumbria.

With the pressure of competing in the league removed, the club continued to flourish, albeit fairly static in terms of growth, but with a steady influx of new blood replacing retirees and players leaving the Club due to work commitments. This continued until the season 2002/2003, when the retirement of several key players at the end of the previous season seriously weakened the squad. Slowly, the corner was turned, and with the steady arrival of new players during 2003 and 2004, the Club found itself in its strongest position in terms of personnel for many years. Along with the upturn in numbers playing and training for the club, the standard of rugby improved, due in no small part to the efforts of our past and present coaches, allowing a return to league rugby for the first time since 1997.

After a brief spell in Divisions 3 and 4, the Club found itself, midway through the 2010/11 Season, languishing in mid-table of Division 5 (North) of the re-branded North West Intermediate Rugby Union Leagues when a change of management and an influx of new players re-invigorated the club. The re-focused squad enjoyed a transformation of fortunes and gained promotion at the end of the season out of the league's basement and into Division 4 (North).

A record breaking season in 2012/13 saw the Club promoted for a second successive year, but this time as Champions and with an astonishing 1000+ points difference, into Division 3 (North). After enjoying two back to back promotions, few expected the club to progress any further. This wasn't to be the case as Warton enjoyed another successful season finishing as runners up just one point behind Preston Grasshoppers. Thereby ensuring the team had achieved three back to back promotions.

== Facilities ==
Home matches are played at Bank Lane sports ground in Warton, Training is held on a flood-lit all-weather pitch during the Winter months and post-match hospitality provided at the Coach & Horses in Freckleton - and new players are always welcome.
