= Listed buildings in Freckleton =

Freckleton is a civil parish in the Borough of Fylde, Lancashire, England. It contains three buildings that are recorded in the National Heritage List for England as designated listed buildings, all of which are listed at Grade II. This grade is the lowest of the three gradings given to listed buildings and is applied to "buildings of national importance and special interest". The parish contains the village of Freckleton, and is otherwise rural. The listed buildings consist of a former farmhouse, a house in the village, and the parish church.

== Buildings ==
Name and location	Photograph	Date	Notes
Hall Cross Farmhouse; 53.76465°N 2.87414°W	—	1777	The former farmhouse is in red brick, partly rendered, with a slate roof. It has three storeys and three bays, with an extension at the rear. On the front is a single-storey gabled porch, above which is a datestone. There are three windows in each floor, all with segmental heads, and a small stair window between the first and second bays.
76 Preston Old Road; 53.75303°N 2.86137°W	—	1780	A brick house, the ground floor rendered, with a tiled roof, in three storeys, and with a symmetrical two-bay front. The central doorway is in a round-headed recess with inscribed imposts and a keystone. There are two windows in each floor.
Holy Trinity Church; 53.75436°N 2.86695°W		1837	The church was designed by John Latham in Norman Revival style. It is a small church in red brick with a slate roof, and consists of a nave with a short chancel and a west tower. The tower was truncated in 1978, and the upper parts were replaced by a hexagonal bell stage with a dome. The windows are round-headed, and inside the church is a west gallery and a wooden pulpit dating from 1633.
