= Bryning-with-Warton =

Civil parish in Lancashire, England

Coordinates: 53.747°N 2.907°W

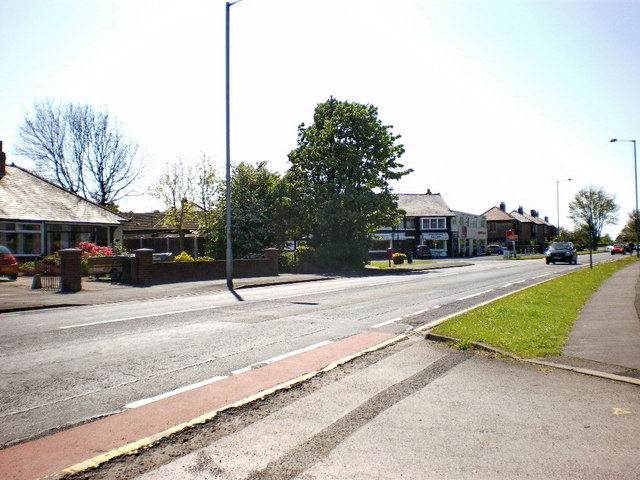
- Lytham Road, Warton

- Shown within Fylde Borough Shown within the Fylde Location within Lancashire
- OS grid reference: SD412285
- Civil parish: Bryning-with-Warton
- District: Fylde
- Shire county: Lancashire
- Region: North West
- Country: England
- Sovereign state: United Kingdom
- Post town: PRESTON
- Postcode district: PR4
- Post town: LYTHAM ST ANNES
- Postcode district: FY8
- Dialling code: 01772
- Police: Lancashire
- Fire: Lancashire
- Ambulance: North West
- UK Parliament: Fylde

Bryning-with-Warton is a civil parish in the Borough of Fylde in Lancashire, England.

The parish contains the village of Warton at SD412285 as well as the hamlets of Bryning (at grid reference SD399299) and Kellamergh (at SD403292). According to the 2001 census the parish had a population of 3,572, increasing to 3,596 at the 2011 Census.

Bryning-with-Warton Parish Council is one of fifteen such councils that serves the borough of Fylde.

The parish contains one listed building, the Grade II listed 204 Lytham Road. Built in the 18th century, it is a rendered cottage with a slate roof, in two storeys and with a two-bay front. The windows in the lower floor are three-light casements, and those in the upper floor are two-light sliding sashes.
