= Quaker's Wood =

Burial ground in Lancashire

Coordinates: 53.7652°N 2.8606°W

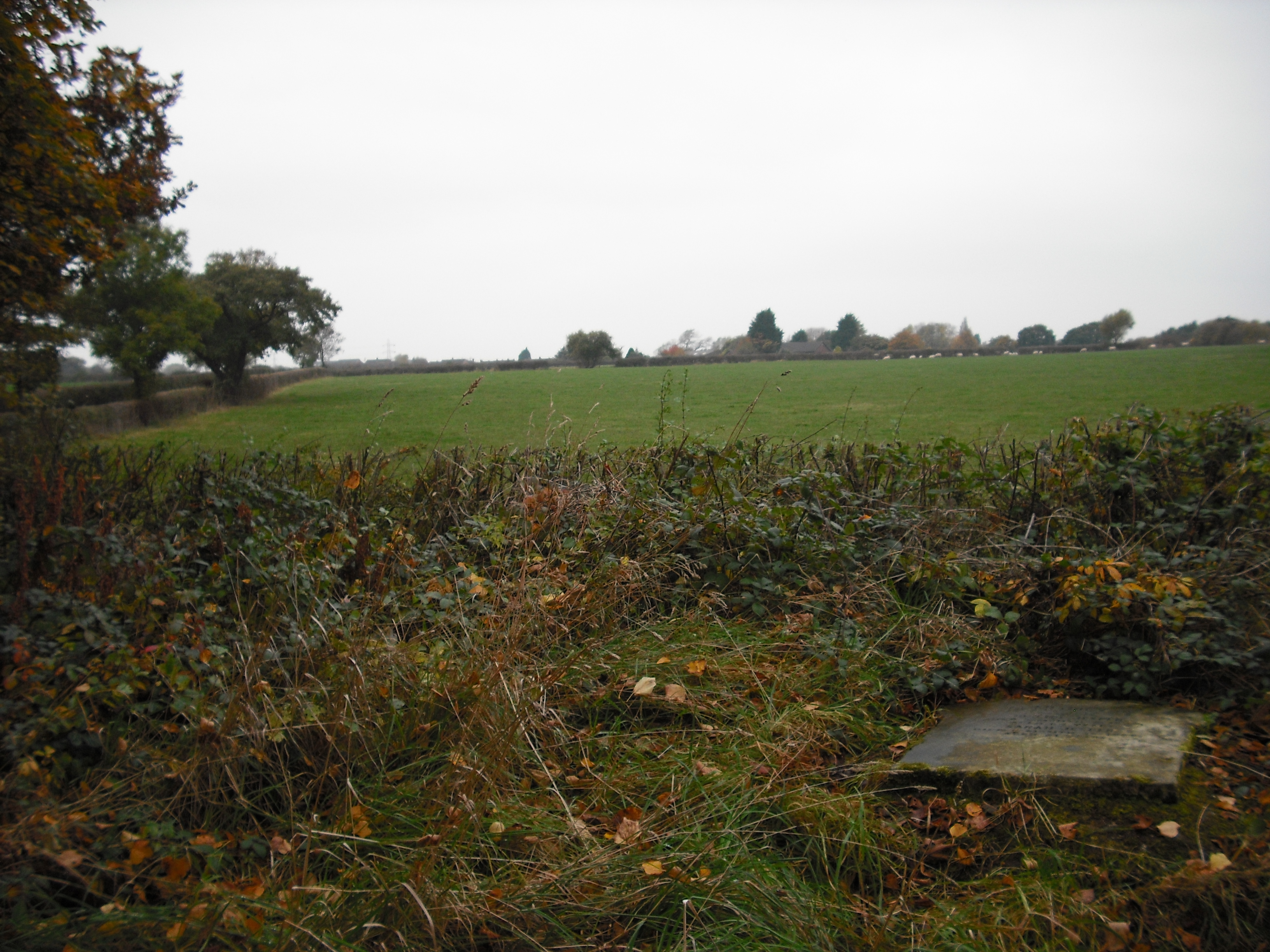
- Quaker's Wood, Lower Lane, Freckleton
- Interactive map of Quaker's Wood

Details
- Established: 1725
- Location: Freckleton, Lancashire
- Country: England
- Type: Public
- Owned by: Freckleton Parish Council
- No. of interments: approx. 35

Quaker's Wood (also known as "Twill Furlong") is a Quaker burial ground in the parish of Freckleton, near Preston, Lancashire, which was established in 1725. Situated at the north east side of Lower Lane, about midway between the village of Freckleton and the town of Kirkham, the ground is a small roughly rectangular plot, of about 420 square metres (500 sq yd). It is surrounded by a low hedge and contains about 20 trees of various ages and species. Although it is the resting place for perhaps as many as 35 persons, it has only one gravestone.

== History ==
George Fox founded the Religious Society of Friends, better known as "The Quakers" in 1647. They typically met in private homes, had no set liturgy and did not employ a hierarchical ecclesiastical structure. Many Quakers escaped persecution in England by migrating to William Penn's colony of Pennsylvania in North America, as part of what was seen as a "holy experiment". The Quakers established a meeting house in Freckleton, Lancashire in 1689 at the house of Lawrence Coulborne.

By the 1720s, the Quakers in Freckleton were holding their weekly meeting at the Marsh Farm. In 1725, John Brown donated to them the "Twill Furlong", located on Lower Lane, the road to Kirkham. The plot became the Quaker burial ground and was known as "Quaker's Wood," and is the final resting place for about 35 people. Befitting their tradition of humility and equality, the Quakers typically only planted trees to memorialize their loved ones, rather than erecting engraved headstones.

In 1796 the Quakers established a "penny school" at Grades Farm, which remained in operation until 1885 and served generations of young people. In the early 1800s, the number of Quakers declined in Freckleton and they joined with a smaller group at Newton-with-Scales, holding their meetings at High Gate Hall. In 1835, a meeting house was erected at Foldside Farm. They continued their penny school and their charitable activities. In 1868 Joseph Jesper, a hatter who lived in nearby Preston, moved with his family to Freckleton and attempted to revive the Quaker movement. In 1870 Jesper demolished the old meeting house and built a new meeting room on School Lane where the Quakers held their weekly meetings. In 1871 the new building was registered as a place of worship by John Satterwaite of Preston.

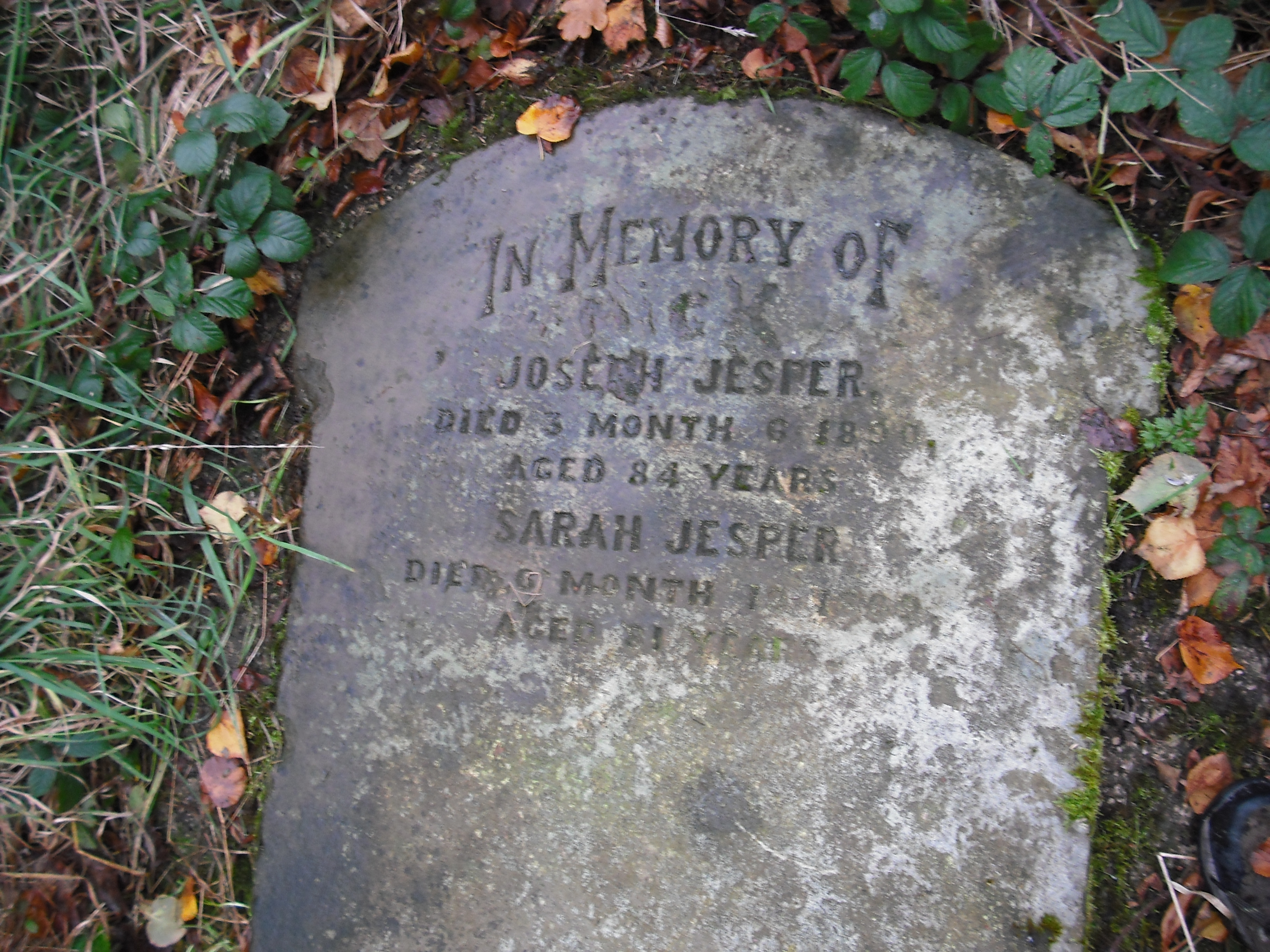
The grave of Joseph and Sarah Jespers

There is just one gravestone at Quaker's Wood, in memory of Joseph Jesper, and his wife Sarah. The stone marker was erected in 1890, by a servant of the Jesper family, to memorialize the lives of his employers. The inscription for Joseph reads: DIED 3 MONTH 6 1890 AGED 84 YEARS and the legend for Sarah reads: DIED 6 MONTH 19 1889 AGED 81 YEARS. (Note: The distinctive date format on the stone reflects a Quaker tradition. Quakers traditionally use numbers to denominate the names of the months and days of the week, something they call the plain calendar. This does not use names of calendar units derived from the names of pagan deities.)

By 1900 all that remained of the Religious Society of Friends in Freckleton was the burial ground. In 1904 William Segar Hodgson J.P. of Kirkham purchased the old meeting house on School Lane and donated it, together with 2 acres (0.81 ha) of land, to the village, stipulating that it should be used for educational and recreational purposes. The original Quaker meeting house became known as The Hodgson Institute. No alcohol was allowed to be used or consumed on the premises. In the early 1900s, the Institute became a meeting place for sportsmen and also accommodated the Women's Institute. Before the outbreak of World War II, Fylde Rural Council held its meetings in the building. It was eventually demolished only in 1974.

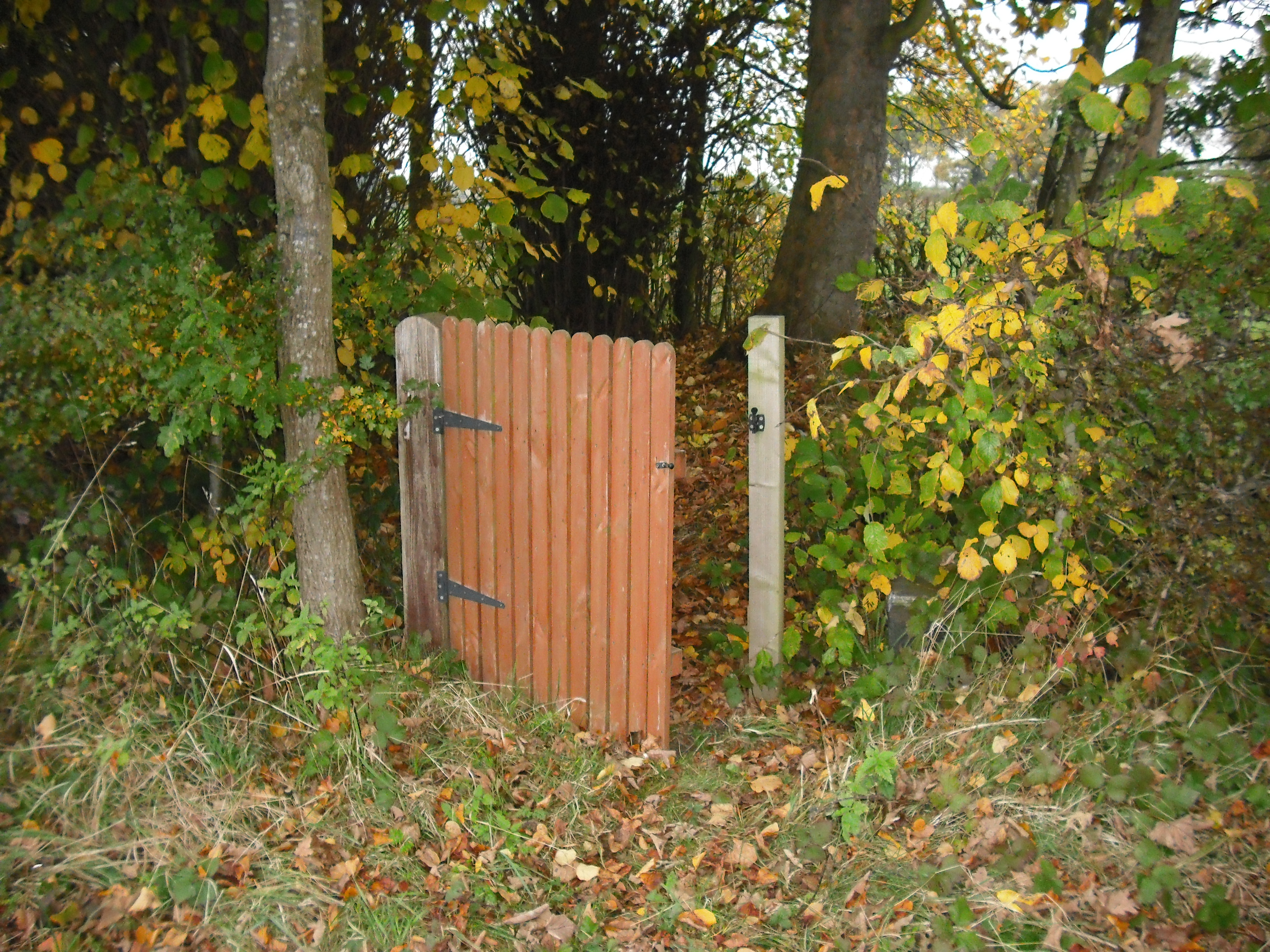
Gate to Quaker's Wood, 2016

For many years the burial ground was protected by its own registered charity. But at a meeting of the Freckleton Parish Council, in April 2011, it was resolved that the council would purchase the land, for a fee of £1 plus legal fees, and would obtain quotes for improvements to the site.

== Sources ==
- "Freckleton". Welcome to Blackpool. visitoruk.com. Archived from the original on 2 December 2024.
- Spencer, Richard (1982). Freckleton in Old Picture Postcards. Europese Bibliotheek. ISBN 978-9-0288-2129-3.
- Hedtke, James (2014). The Freckleton, England Air Disaster. Jefferson, NC: McFarland & Company, Inc. Publishers. p. 62. ISBN 978-0-7864-7841-5.
- Stringer, Phil (1 October 2016). "Freckleton". genuki.org.
- "Freckleton Parish Council, Minutes of the Parish Council Meeting, held on Monday 4th April 2011" (PDF). freckletonparishcouncil.org. 9 May 2011.
