= Warton Aerodrome =

Airfield in Lancashire, England

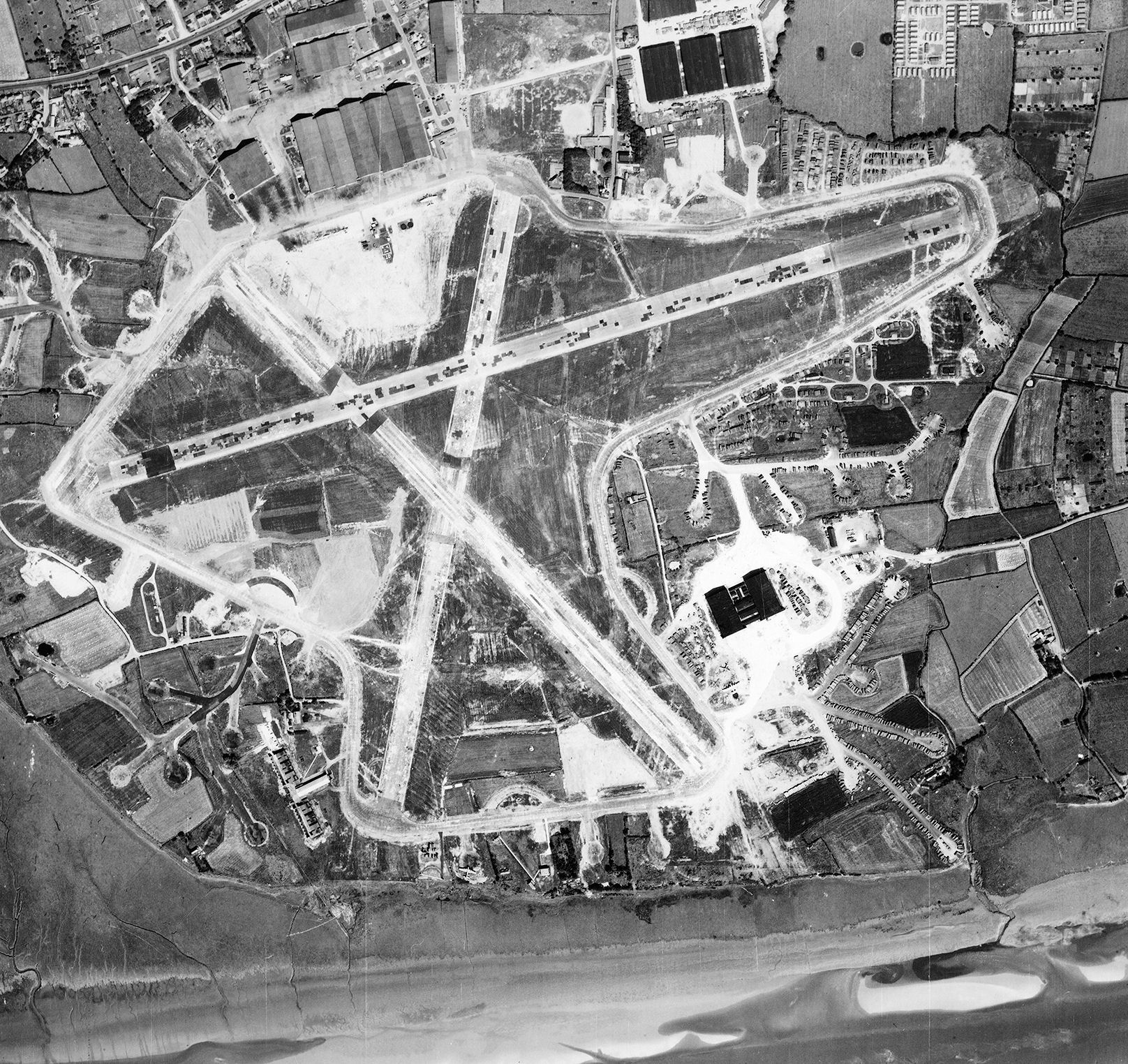
- Aerial photograph of Warton airfield, the main runway runs NE/SW, main hangars and technical buildings are to the north, 10 August 1945.
- IATA: WRT; ICAO: EGNO

Summary
- Airport type: Private
- Owner/Operator: BAE Systems
- Location: Preston
- Elevation AMSL: 55 ft (17 m)
- Coordinates: 53°44′42″N 002°53′02″W

Map
- Location in the Borough of Fylde

Runways
Direction	Length		Surface
Direction	m	ft	Surface
07/25	2,422	7,946	Grooved Asphalt
- Sources: UK AIP at NATS

Warton Aerodrome (IATA: WRT, ICAO: EGNO) is an airfield located in Warton village on the Fylde in Lancashire, England. It is 7 miles (11 km) west of Preston, Lancashire. The eastern end of the site adjoins the village of Freckleton.

The airfield is a major assembly and testing facility of BAE Systems Military Air & Information. It is also part of the Lancashire Enterprise Zone.

Warton Aerodrome has a CAA Ordinary Licence (Number P748) that allows flights for the public transport of passengers or for flying instruction, as authorised by the licensee (BAE Systems (Operations) Limited).

== History ==
=== Establishment and military use ===
In 1940 new runways were built at Warton so that it could act as a "satellite" airfield for the RAF Coastal Command station at Squires Gate airfield in Blackpool.

The airfield was first operated as an air depot of the United States Army Air Forces (USAAF) during the Second World War, as thousands of aircraft were processed on their way to active service in Britain, North Africa, the Mediterranean and mainland Europe. It hosted the 402d Air Depot, later the 402d Base Air Depot, from 15 April 1943 - 24 November 1945.

On 14 August 1944 Glenn Miller, recently promoted to the rank of major, played a concert to 10,000 servicemen on a platform erected in front of No. 4 Hangar. On 23 August 1944, the accidental crash of a USAAF Consolidated B-24 Liberator heavy bomber caused the Freckleton Air Disaster, resulting in 61 fatalities, including 38 children and two teenagers.

It then became a Royal Air Force station.

=== Aircraft manufacturers ===
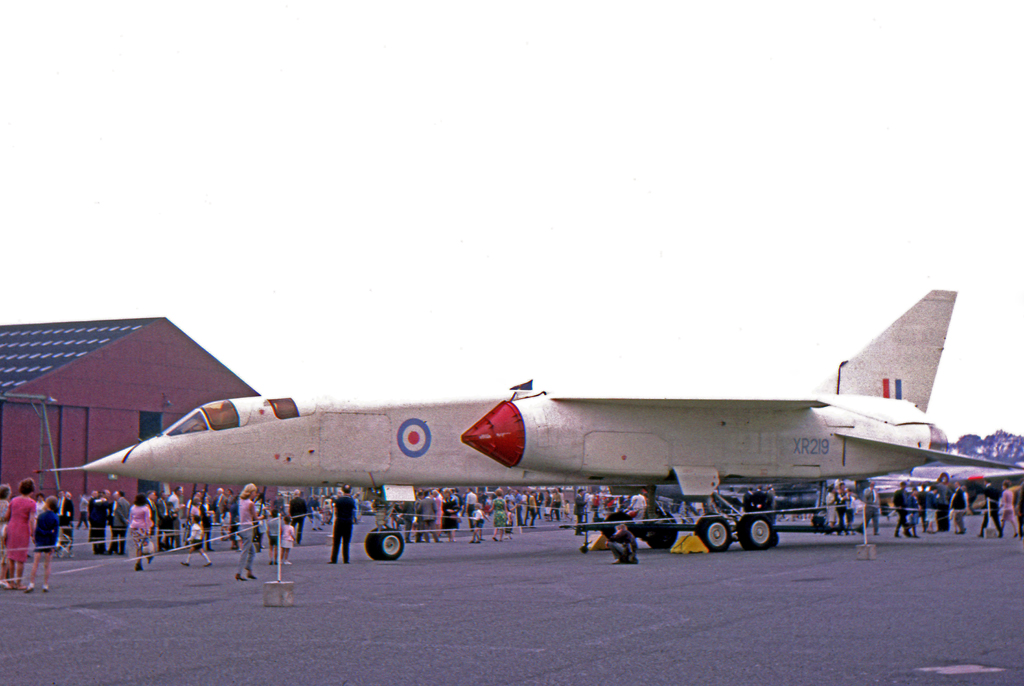
Prototype BAC TSR2 at Warton in 1966

In 1947, English Electric took over the site, moving its main design office there from the Strand Road site in Preston in 1948.

With the merger of English Electric Aviation and the other aircraft divisions of the major British manufacturers in 1960, it became a British Aircraft Corporation (BAC) site. BAC was then nationalised and merged with Hawker Siddeley and Scottish Aviation to form British Aerospace (BAe) in 1977. British Aerospace was privatised in 1981 and was renamed BAE Systems in 1999. As such the airfield has been the flight test centre for various frontline military aircraft including the English Electric Canberra, the English Electric Lightning, the BAC TSR-2, the Sepecat Jaguar, the Panavia Tornado, the BAE Hawk (formerly the Hawker Siddeley Hawk) and most recently the Eurofighter Typhoon.

== Development ==
=== Eurofighter Typhoon ===
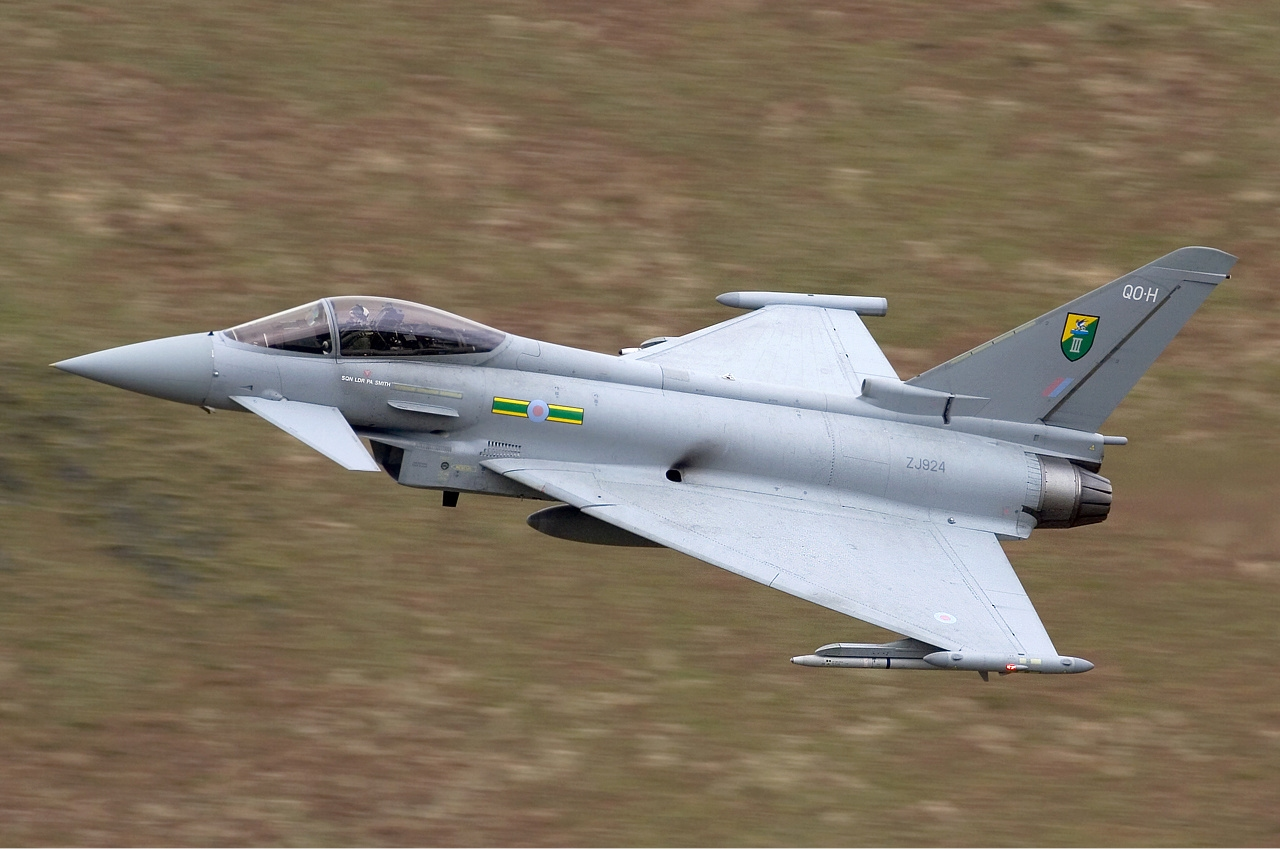
An RAF Typhoon F2 flying through the Mach Loop

Warton was used as the base for all British development aircraft (DA) and Instrumented Production Aircraft (IPA) in the Eurofighter programme. Warton has been home to the initial Typhoon squadrons of the Royal Air Force, No. 17 Squadron and No. 29 Squadron. This was under the so-called "Case White" programme where BAE assumes more responsibility for training and support of the new aircraft than previous RAF types which were introduced under a more "in house" system. BAE states that this allows inevitable problems with any new aircraft to be quickly ironed out by BAE personnel on site. BAE plans to offer this on site service to any export customers.

=== Nimrod ===
Warton was also used for development flying of the Nimrod MRA4 Maritime Reconnaissance and Attack aircraft until the aircraft was cut in the Strategic Defence and Security Review in 2010.

== Production ==
=== Tornado ===
The final new build Tornado left Warton in 1998, a GR.1 for Saudi Arabia. Following this the main assembly hall was re-fitted as the final assembly site of the Eurofighter Typhoon. BAE estimate that modern manufacturing techniques will allow the 30-week assembly time for a Tornado to be reduced to 16 weeks for the Typhoon.

== Private airfield ==
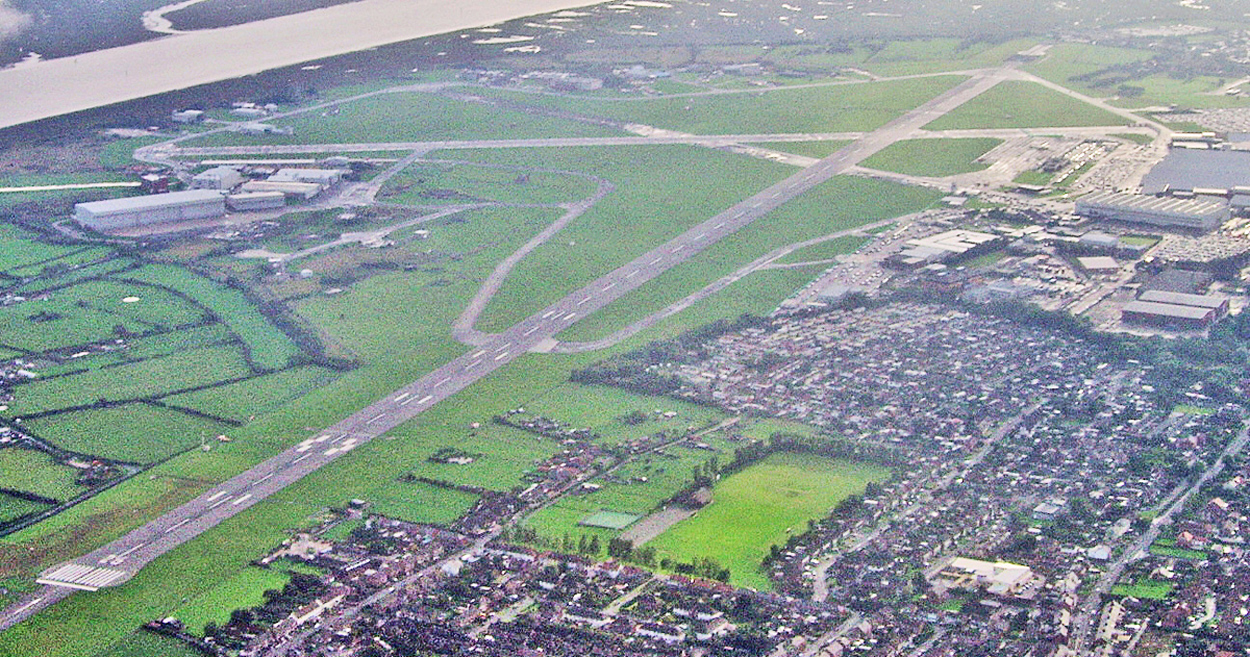
Overview of the airfield runways and structures looking WSW in 2006

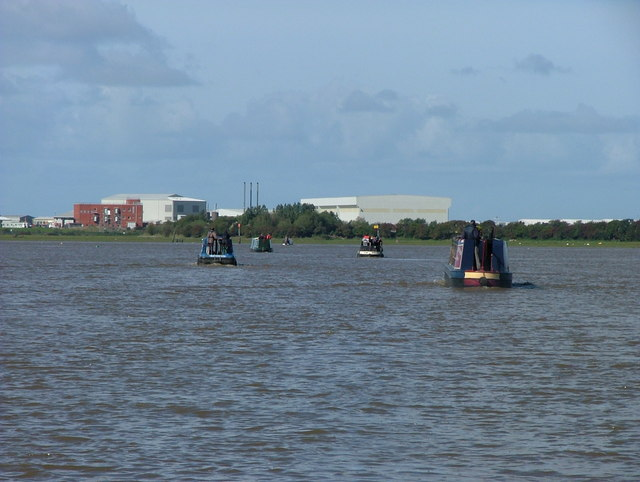
Seen from the River Ribble

Warton is the base for BAE Systems' Corporate Air Travel department which operates scheduled services for employees (and those of partner organisations) to Farnborough, Munich, Cambridge, RAF Coningsby, and RAF Marham. The Farnborough and Munich services are provided by Corporate Air Travel's Embraer 145 aircraft, with the others contracted out to other operators. Many ad hoc passenger flights also take place operated by various VIP operators.

The site is not open to the public. For many years limited areas were made accessible during open days, on a four-yearly cycle alternating with Samlesbury, which the company held for the families and friends of employees and local residents. These "Families' Days" were free of charge and typically included demonstrations of activities, tours of simulation facilities and impressive flying displays. The last Families' Day was held in 2006.

=== Police helicopter ===
From November 1994, the Lancashire Constabulary operated a Eurocopter AS355 helicopter stationed at Warton. Later, it was replaced by a newer, more capable, EC135.

This has now been withdrawn and is being covered by the National Police Air Service based at Barton.

=== Lightning XS928 ===
The airfield has English Electric Lightning F.6 XS928 on permanent static display

== Protests ==
In January 1996 four women, known as the Ploughshare Four, caused more than £1.5m in damage to a Hawk warplane at the site. They were found not guilty of criminal damage at Liverpool Crown Court after a jury deemed their action was reasonable under the Genocide Act 1969. The Hawk was destined for Indonesia where the women argued it would likely be used to kill civilians in East Timor.

On 29 January 2017 Rev Dan Woodhouse, a Methodist minister in Leeds and Sam Walton, a Quaker, were arrested at the site after allegedly trying to disarm warplanes bound for Saudi Arabia. Lancashire Constabulary said they were being held on suspicion of causing criminal damage. In a statement, Woodhouse said stopping warplanes "would save lives". Walton reported that the two carried one of the hammers used by the Ploughshare Four, which had since been confiscated by police. In October 2017 Walton and Woodhouse appeared at Burnley Magistrates court facing charges of criminal damage; both were found not guilty after successfully arguing that they acted for the greater good.

== Enterprise zone ==
Since 2012, the aerodrome has provided one of the two sites of Lancashire Enterprise Zone, the other site being at BAE Systems' Samlesbury Aerodrome. The zone's site at Warton covers 72 hectares (180 acres). BAE Systems, Lancashire County Council and Lancashire Enterprise Partnership coordinate the site's development.

== See also ==
- List of aerospace flight test centres
