= Jeff Norman =

British long-distance runner

Personal information
- Nationality: British (English)
- Born: 6 February 1945 (age 81) Leigh, Lancashire, England
- Height: 173 cm (5 ft 8 in)
- Weight: 59 kg (130 lb)

Sport
- Sport: Athletics
- Event: long-distance
- Club: Altrincham & District AC

George Jeffrey Norman (born 6 February 1945 in Leigh, Lancashire) is a male British former long-distance, marathon, cross country and fell runner. He competed at the 1976 Summer Olympics.

== Biography ==
Norman won the Three Peaks Race six times between 1970 and 1975 setting a course record in 1974.

Norman became the British marathon champion after winning the British AAA Championships title at the 1975 AAA Championships. He would podium twice more at the AAAs in 1976 and 1978.

At the 1976 Olympics Games in Montreal, he represented Great Britain in the men's marathon.

He represented England in the marathon, at the 1978 Commonwealth Games in Edmonton, Canada.

Norman set the British 50 km track record on 7 June 1980 in Timperley with a time of 2:48:06. He also formerly held the British road record for the same distance, having run a time of 2:53:21 on 23 February 1985 in Douglas, Isle of Man.

== Competition record ==
Year	Competition	Venue	Position	Event	Notes
Representing United Kingdom and England
1976	Olympic Games	Montreal, Canada	26th	Marathon	2:20:04
1978	Freckleton Half Marathon	Freckleton, Lancashire	1st	Half Marathon	1:06:18
1978	Commonwealth Games	Edmonton, Canada	12th	Marathon	2:22:23
