= Freckleton Half Marathon =

- Date: June
- Location: Freckleton, Lancashire
- Event type: Road
- Distance: Half marathon
- Established: 1965; 61 years ago
- Course records: 1:04:45 (men); 1:12:56 (women)
- Website: Official website

The Freckleton Half Marathon is an annual road running event held in Freckleton, Lancashire, United Kingdom. The event was the idea of the then chairman of the local sport committee who was inspired by Ron Hill's performance in the 1964 Summer Olympics, and Ron accepted the invitation to run. Ron won that first race and later described the distance "The half marathon is a great distance, as you can push yourself almost flat out without the risk of blowing up". Ron returned to Freckleton in 2007, aged 70, and wore the race number 65 in honour of the first year.

The race provided three of the first six world records at this relatively new Half Marathon distance, two achieved by Ron Hill in 1965 and 1969, and one by Pete Ravald in 1966.

Ben Fish of Blackurn Harriers and Team Fish holds the record for the most wins with a record nine wins in nine years m.

The race is the oldest continuously running Half Marathon event in the UK, after the demise of the Romford Half Marathon and The Morpeth.

== Winners ==
First places	Athletes
10	Ben Fish
6	Susan Catterall, Ken Moss
4	Ron Hill, Pete Banks
3	Kathryn Charnock, Roger Brewster, Paul Muller, Joanna Goorney

Year by year:

Date	Time (h:m:s)	First Man	Time (h:m:s)	First Woman
19 June 2022	1:11:29	Ben Fish	1:24:37	Dionne Allen
16 June 2019	1:10:26	Robert Danson	1:28:47	Margaret Beever
17 June 2018	1:07:19	John Mason	1:31:53	Tracey Allan
18 June 2017	1:11:15	David Rigby	1:33:14	Joanna Goorney
19 June 2016	1:09:24	David Rigby	1:28:38	Joanna Goorney
21 June 2015	1:09:19	Ben Fish	1:25:13	Michelle Nolan
22 June 2014	1:10:30	Ben Fish	1:23:42	Tessa Walker
16 June 2013	1:10:30	Ben Fish	1:29:45	Joanna Goorney
17 June 2012	1:07:38	Ben Fish	1:19:10	Carly Needham
19 June 2011	1:11:03	Ben Fish	1:24:50	Caroline Betmead
20 June 2010	1:08:27	Ben Fish	1:20:45	Carly Needham
21 June 2009	1:08:44	Ben Fish	1:26:40	Beverley Wright
22 June 2008	1:12:34	Ben Fish	1:29:32	Alison Sedman
17 June 2007	1:09:44	Ben Fish	1:28:00	Anne Sweeney
18 June 2006	1:13:05	Peter Newton	1:27:11	Tracey Dutton
19 June 2005	1:12:40	Eddie Simpson	1:30:50	Tracey Dutton
20 June 2004	1:11:25	Duncan Mason	1:26:20	Karen Hutchinson
22 June 2003	1:17:09	Roger Brewster	1:33:13	Susan Catterall
16 June 2002	1:12:48	Darren Hale	1:26:39	Alison Crook
17 June 2001	1:07:08	Duncan Mason	1:21:03	Kathryn Charnock
18 June 2000	1:15:05	Darren Hale	1:37:52	Karen Hutchinson
20 June 1999	1:09:33	Graham Hill	1:24:27	Joan Jackson
21 June 1998	1:10:50	Paul Muller	1:25:22	Joan Jackson
22 June 1997	1:11:32	Paul Muller	1:20:59	Kathryn Charnock
16 June 1996	1:10:59	Paul Muller	1:23:55	Kathryn Charnock
18 June 1995	1:09:38	Pete Banks	1:21:23	Jan Rashleigh
19 June 1994	1:08:44	Pete Banks	1:24:37	Lynne Quigley
20 June 1993	1:08:14	Pete Banks	1:22:49	Janice Needham
21 June 1992	1:10:07	Ken Moss	1:22:52	Susan Catterall
16 June 1991	1:08:02	Pete Banks	1:24:22	Denise Wakefield
17 June 1990	1:09:55	Ken Moss	1:23:06	Susan Catterall
18 June 1989	1:09:18	Ken Moss	1:23:46	Susan Catterall
19 June 1988	1:09:26	Ken Moss	1:12:56	Veronique Marot
21 June 1987	1:08:57	Ken Moss	1:28:19	Maureen Platt
22 June 1986	1:09:03	Ken Moss	1:18:35	Collette Harkin
16 June 1985	1:06:54	Roger Brewster	1:23:52	Susan Catterall
17 June 1984	1:07:26	Roger Brewster	1:20:15	Susan Catterall
18 June 1983	1:09:32	Peter Morris	1:28:28	Frances Mudway
19 June 1982	1:07:42	Joe Ritson	1:20:14	Anne Pendlebury
20 June 1981	1:07:20	Gerard Helme	1:29:06	Anne Pendlebury
21 June 1980	1:06:50	Stan Curran		
16 June 1979	1:06:05	Barry Bowler	1:23:14	Collette Chapman
17 June 1978	1:06:18	Jeffrey Norman	1:37:31	Sue Styan
18 June 1977	1:06:37	Kevin Best	1:53:05	Elly Deady
19 June 1976	1:05:31	Roger Harrison		
21 June 1975	1:08:06	Norman Deakin		
15 June 1974	1:07:26	Dave Evans		
16 June 1973	1:05:40	Alan Blinston		
17 June 1972	1:06:30	John Calvert		
19 June 1971	1:05:25	Ron Hill		
20 June 1970	1:06:03	Ron Hill		
21 June 1969	1:04:45	Ron Hill		
15 June 1968	1:07:20	John Fewery		
17 June 1967	1:07:35	Martin Craven		
18 June 1966	1:05:42	Pete Ravald		
19 June 1965	1:05:44	Ron Hill		
