= Freckleton =

Village in Lancashire, England

Coordinates: 53.753°N 2.867°W

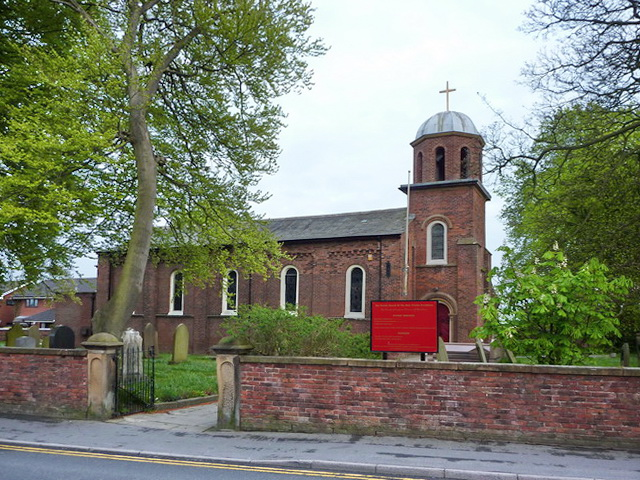
- Holy Trinity Church

- Shown within Fylde Borough Shown within the Fylde Location within Lancashire
- Population: 6,019 (2011)
- OS grid reference: SD429289
- Civil parish: Freckleton
- District: Fylde
- Shire county: Lancashire
- Region: North West
- Country: England
- Sovereign state: United Kingdom
- Post town: Preston
- Postcode district: PR4
- Dialling code: 01772
- Police: Lancashire
- Fire: Lancashire
- Ambulance: North West

Freckleton is a village and civil parish on the Fylde coast in Lancashire, England, to the south of Kirkham and east of the seaside resort of Lytham St. Annes. In 2001 the parish had a population of 6,045, reducing to 6,019 at the 2011 Census. The village is near Warton, with its links to BAE Systems. Warton Aerodrome's 1.5 miles (2.4 km) runway is partly within Freckleton's boundary. Freckleton has a parish council, and is part of Fylde Borough, and Fylde constituency.

== History ==
The name of the village appears in the Domesday Book as "Frecheltun" and is said to derive from 'Farmstead of a man called Frecla', with Old English tun and Nordic personal name. It was one of 62 settlements to be found in the Hundred of "Agemvndrenesse" (Amounderness). Another suggested derivation is from the Anglo-Saxon word for "lusty" or "argumentative".

Freckleton supplied water to the Roman fort at Kirkham, and in the 19th century was a port for the ship building industry. Rope and sailcloth, for the early boatbuilding industry, was made in the village for many years. Balderstone Mill, erected in 1880, was the first organised factory system in the village, its weaving shed had 320 looms, and the cloth it produced sold on the Manchester Cotton Exchange. These mills closed in 1980.

There was a water-mill on the Dow Brook from at least as early as 1427 when it was in the possession of a William Hodelliston. It was sold in 1882 for £350. The sale was to allow for the mill's demolition, to enable more effective drainage of the marsh.

The Quaker burial ground at Quaker's Wood, also known as "Twill Furlong", in Lower Lane, between Freckleton and Kirkham, has a single gravestone.

Until the 1920s, Freckleton had a tollgate and travelers to Lytham and Preston had to pay a toll to use the turnpike road. The toll was collected at toll house bridge. The toll could be avoided by crossing the Dow brook and walking along the bridle way.

In World War II, American forces from the neighbouring Warton Aerodrome resided in the village. The Freckleton Air Disaster occurred on 23 August 1944, when a USAF Consolidated B-24H Liberator attempting to land at Warton during stormy weather crashed onto Freckleton's Holy Trinity School. Sixty-one people lost their lives, including thirty-eight infants, their two teachers, and the three air crew. Other victims included several residents and both British and American military personnel in a snack bar across the road from the school. Annual commemorations still take place, attended by residents and US veterans. The aerodrome was subsequently purchased by English Electric, now BAE Systems, and many BAE employees live in the village.

The area around the village War Memorial, now protected by railings, was once the village green, where stood the smithy and toll house.

== Landmarks ==
The village is the home of Holy Trinity Church of England parish church which was founded in 1837 and of Freckleton Methodist Church which was founded in 1810.

The family butcher Snape, on Kirkham Road, was established in 1864.

Freckleton Library was opened in 1980 by Sir Edward Gardner, MP for Fylde South. It replaced the mobile library which used the same site. Before the new library opened, the public library was situated on Lytham Road. Freckleton Library closed in September 2016 as part of Lancashire County Council budget cuts but was reopened on 9 January 2018.

== Sport ==
Freckleton Football Club play at the Rawstorne Sports Centre, located at Bush Lane. The club currently compete in the west lancs league division 2.

Freckleton Cricket Club plays at Bush Lane; it was formed at the beginning of the 1900s. It won the Meyler Cup for the third time in 2013, following up wins in 2012 and 2002. The side currently competes in the Premier Division of the Moore & Smalley Palace Shield Competition and will be led in 2015 by Andrew Hogarth, who succeeds the charismatic James 'Jimmy' Fiddler.

Freckleton stages the Freckleton Half Marathon each year in June. The race has been staged since 1965 and is the oldest half marathon in the UK. The first race was won by Ron Hill who participated in the 1964 Olympics marathon. It attracts over 700 entrants.

== Transport ==
Stagecoach operators one service in the village. Preston or Blackpool. Archway travel also operates a service to Kirkham and St Annes.

The nearest train station is Kirkham & Wesham. All services out of the station is run by Northern. The station has services to Blackpool North and Blackpool South going towards Blackpool and going away from Blackpool there is train services to Colne, Liverpool Lime Street, Manchester Airport and Manchester Oxford Road.

== Images ==
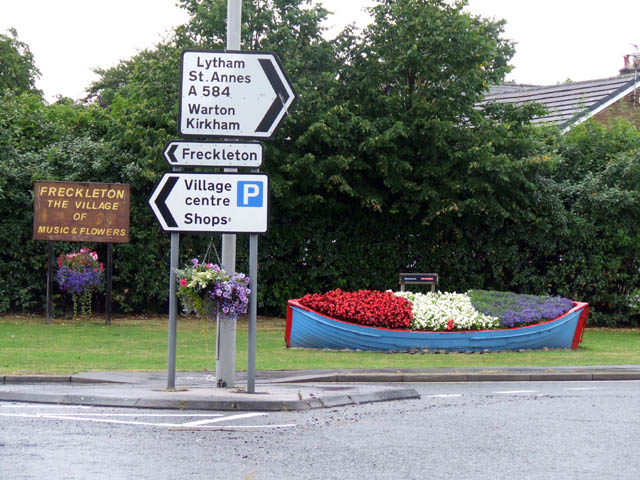
Entrance to the village, with floral boat display

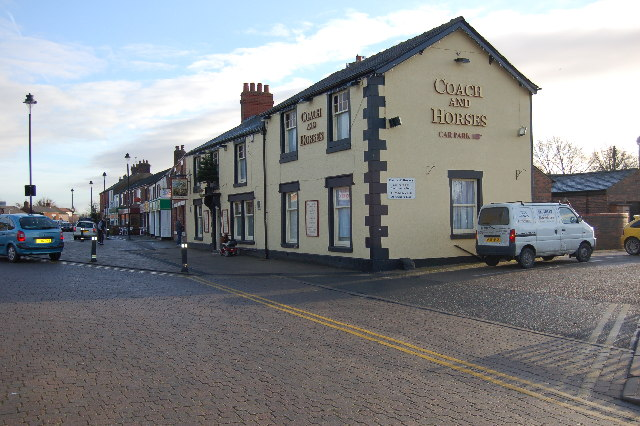
The Coach and Horses, known locally as "Ponky's"

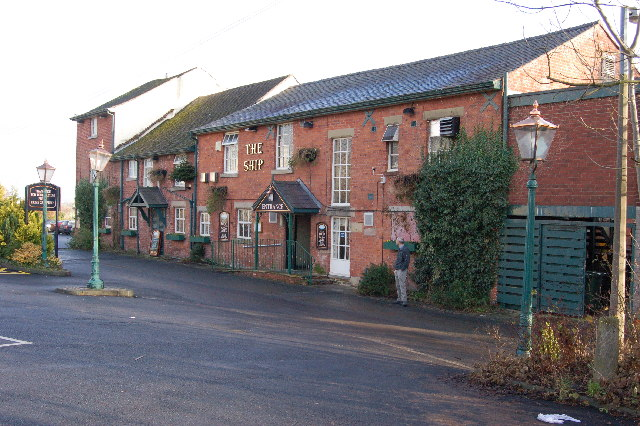
The Ship at Freckleton Creek

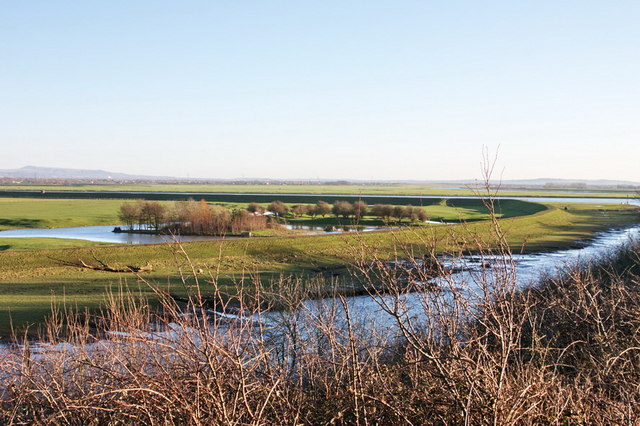
Freckleton Pool

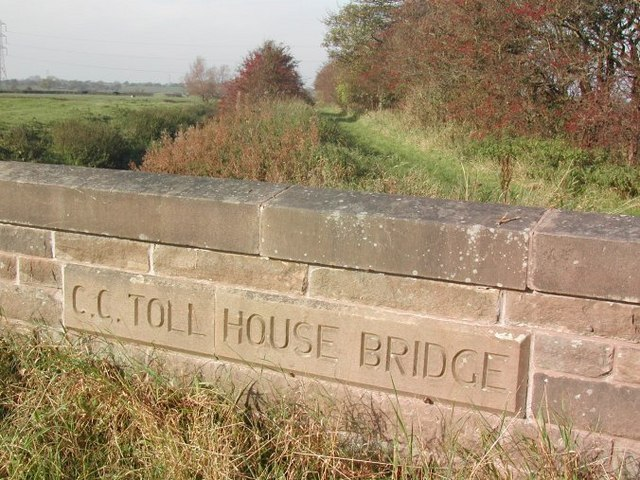
Toll House Bridge and bridleway

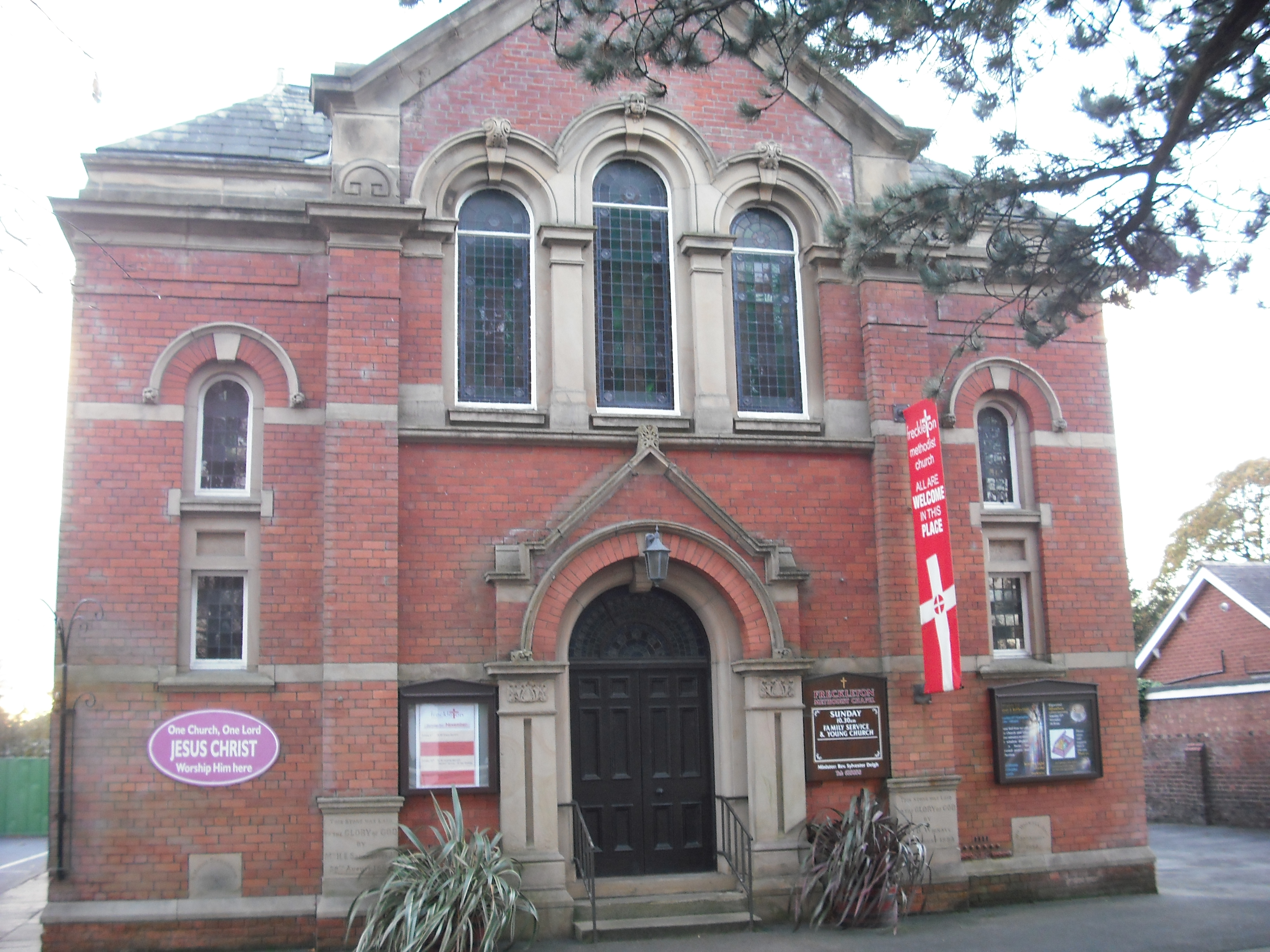
Freckleton Methodist Church

== See also ==
- Freckleton air disaster
- Listed buildings in Freckleton
