= Warton, Fylde =

Village in Lancashire, England

Coordinates: 53.750°N 2.893°W

Warton
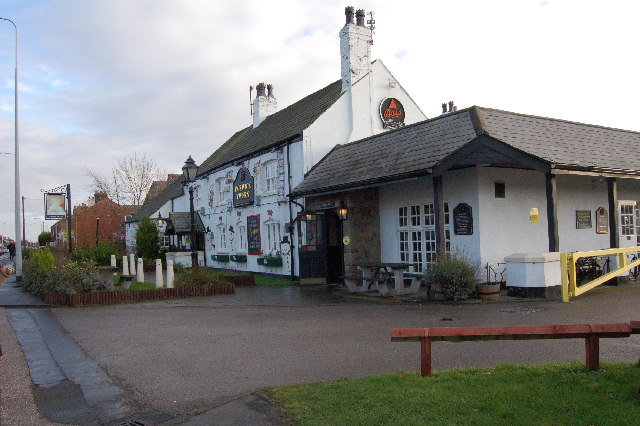
- The Pickwick Tavern public house, Warton

- Shown within Fylde Borough Shown within the Fylde Location within Lancashire
- OS grid reference: SD412285
- Civil parish: Bryning-with-Warton
- District: Fylde
- Shire county: Lancashire
- Region: North West
- Country: England
- Sovereign state: United Kingdom
- Post town: PRESTON
- Postcode district: PR4
- Dialling code: 01772
- Police: Lancashire
- Fire: Lancashire
- Ambulance: North West
- UK Parliament: Fylde

Warton is a village in the civil parish of Bryning-with-Warton, on the Fylde, in the Fylde district, in the county of Lancashire, England.

The village is 6 miles (10 km) west of Preston and 8 miles (13 km) south-east of Blackpool. It is located on the banks of the River Ribble, close to its entry into the Irish Sea. It is best known for its airfield, Warton Aerodrome and the associated aircraft manufacturing plant of BAE Systems Military Air & Information.

== History ==
The village is named Wartun or Wartuna in the Domesday Book, and the current spelling is first seen in 1227.

For probate purposes, prior to 1858, Warton was in the Archdeaconry of Richmond, in the Diocese of Chester.

Warton was formerly a township and chapelry in the parish of Kirkham, in 1866 Warton became a separate civil parish, on 1 April 1934 the parish was abolished to form "Bryning with Warton", part also went to Freckleton. In 1931 the parish had a population of 585.

In his 1870 Gazetteer, Wilson reports that the chapelry of Warton also included the Freckleton township, and comprised 6,598 acres, with a population 1,325 and 270 houses. The property is described as being "much subdivided". Cotton spinning and the manufacture of sacking, sailcloth, and cordage were the main occupations. There were two churches, both described as "good". There were also two Methodist chapels.

Warton Post Mill, one of the last sunk post mills in England, was situated at the end of Mill Lane. All that remains of the former post mill is a circular wooden post that is stabilised by crossed timbers. The mill is thought to have been built in Lincolnshire in about 1695 before being moved to Rufford, Lancashire, in the early-mid 18th century and subsequently to Warton in 1771. It was last wind worked in about 1895. It then deteriorated and the ruin was left standing in the middle of a scrap yard. In June 1999 the substructure was excavated by the Chorley Archaeological Society. The buried cross-trees and the lower ends of the main post and quarterbars were all found to be rotten. In September 1999 three of the quarterbars were destroyed by vandals. The mill was consequently dismantled and stored in the nearby BAE Systems factory. Only the millstone and the old anvil are preserved at the former smithy. It was a Grade II listed building from 1996 until 2019. The mill is reflected in the name of the modern nearby street Post Lane.

== St Paul's Church ==
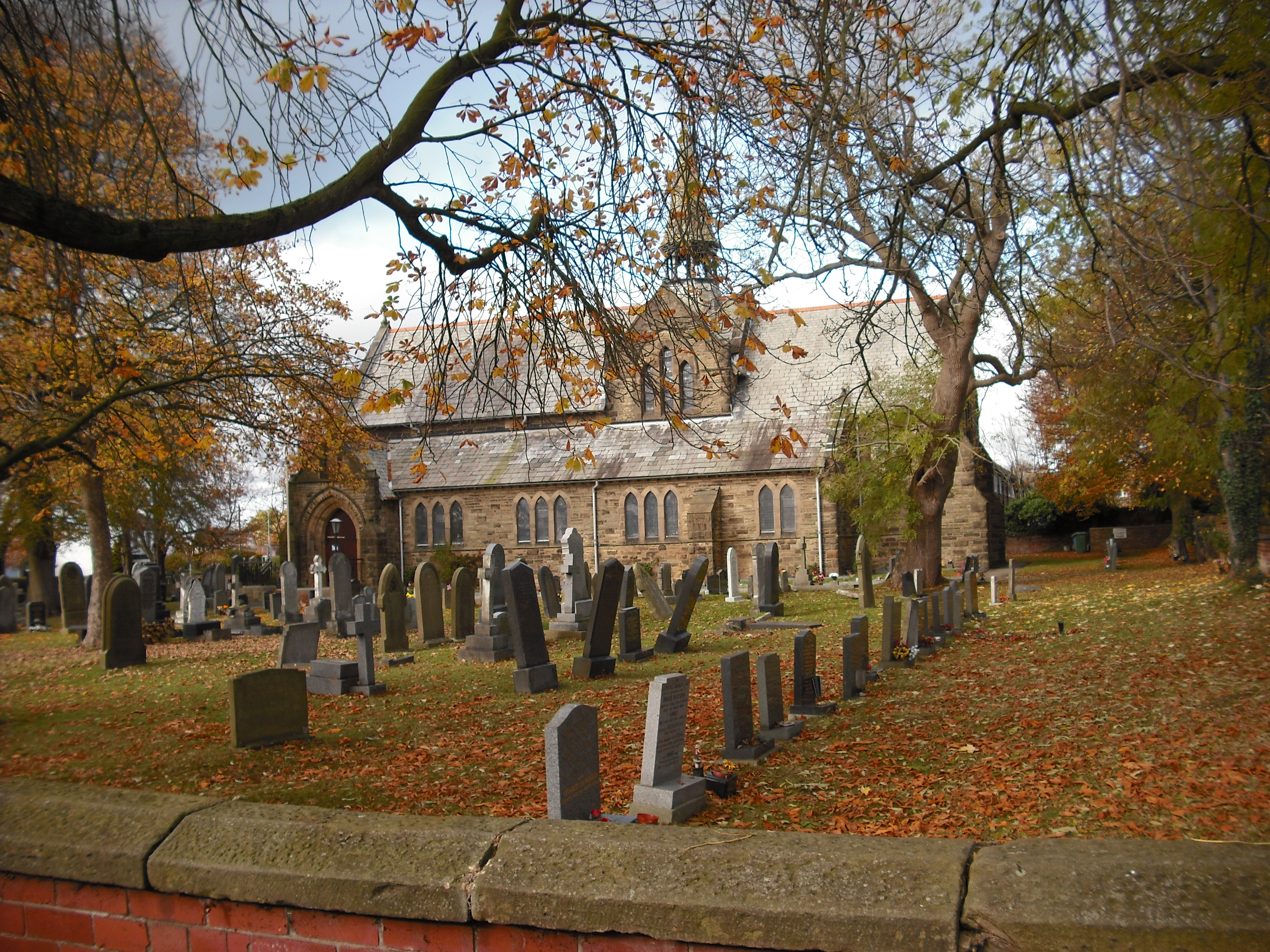
St Paul's Church

The first church, Holy Trinity on Church Road, was built in 1722 and consecrated in 1725. Originally built as a chapel of ease to Kirkham, it eventually became a parish church with its own vicar.

The present church has a sanctuary chair bearing the initials WS and MS and dated 1611. A William Shaw, who died in 1720, donated the land for the old church to be built on, and a local historian has suggested that the initials may be those of two of his ancestors.

In his 1870 Gazetteer, Wilson reports that the living was a vicarage in the diocese of Manchester with a value of £350, the patron being Christ Church in Oxford.

The present church, now dedicated to St Paul, was built in 1886. A selection of celebratory events took place for the 125th Anniversary of the church, over the weekend of 25 and 26 June 2011, including an organ recital. The church is linked with a Lutheran church in Timmerlah in the Diocese of Braunschweig in Northern Germany.

On 4 August 2014 the church hosted a photographic exhibition to mark the 100th anniversary of the start of World War I.

During the hours of darkness the church is floodlit. Since June 2018 the vicar has been Rev. Jane Greenhalgh. The curate is Rev. Fiona Haines. Greenhalgh was criticised, in 2018, for wearing a white poppy for the annual Remembrance Day service and for by including references to white supremacy, the Ku Klux Klan and the English Defence League in her sermon.

== Parish council ==
Bryning-with-Warton Parish Council is one of fifteen such councils that serves the Borough of Fylde. The parish spans across Bryning to Warton hall.

== Air Training Corps ==
Warton is home to the 967 (BAE Warton Squadron) Air Training Corps, nicknamed the Warton Wanderers. It is a member of the Cumbria and Lancashire Wing of the ATC.

== Education ==
Bryning-with-Warton St Paul's Church of England Primary School is located on Lytham Road (A584). St Paul's was established in 1821 and is a Voluntary Aided Church of England primary school. Holy Family Catholic Primary School is also located on Lytham Road.

== Amenities ==
Warton Library was situated at 156 Lytham Road The library premises closed in 2010 but has since been re-furbished and is used as staging point for police community support officers. On 8 February 2013 the premises re-opened as a community library offering a book exchange service every Wednesday and Saturday.

The village has two public houses. The Birley Arms is located on Bryning Lane. The Birley family were 19th century flax and cotton mill-owners in nearby Kirkham. The second public house is situated on the main road through the village. Originally known as the Clifton Arms. In the 1960s,it was refurbished and re-opened as The Pickwick Tavern. In October 2012 the public house reverted to the Clifton Arms at Warton. In addition to the two public houses there is a social club, the Chequers, located on Harbour Lane. There is also a Morrisons on Harbour Lane and a Tesco Express on Lytham Road. The village Post Office closed in July 2012 and the premises is now for sale. In June 2015 a Post Office counter was opened in McColl's, which is open from 6am to 10pm daily. The village has a number of car sales outlets. The main garage in the village, J. Townsend and Son, was largely demolished in 2017 and reopened as a Spar, including butchers and delicatessen in 2018. Fuel is now sold on the new forecourt through the Spar counters but Townsends have retained their tyre and car repair business, sharing their space with Coastal Coaches. The village also attracts many tourists from the populous caravan and holiday parks in the area including Oaklands Caravan Park situated on Lytham Road which is owned by the U.K. Leisure Parks group.

== Sport ==
National League football club AFC Fylde originally played home games at Kellamergh Park in the village, between 2006 and 2016, having previously played at the council-owned Coronation Road in Kirkham. They now play at a purpose-built stadium at the new £18m development Mill Farm Sports Village in Wesham.

== See also ==
- Listed buildings in Bryning-with-Warton
