= Richard de Carpentier =

- Born: Richard de Carpentier; 30 April 1990 (age 36) Manchester, England
- Height: 1.94 m (6 ft 4 in)
- Weight: 105 kg (16 st 7 lb; 231 lb)
- School: Kirkham Grammar School
- University: UWIC

Rugby union career
- Position: Flanker
Senior career
Years	Team	Apps	(Points)
2011-2012	Leicester Tigers	1	(0)
2012-2015	Worcester Warriors	36	(0)
2020-2021	Harlequins	4	(0)
2021–2023	Bath	27	(0)
National sevens team
Years	Team		Comps
2011–2020	England 7s		43
Medal record
Men's rugby sevens
Representing England
Commonwealth Games
Bronze medal – third place	2018 Gold Coast	Team competition

Richard de Carpentier (born 30 April 1990) is a retired rugby union player. He played backrow and forward for England Sevens. He played club rugby mainly for Bath & Worcester Warriors, while also featuring for Harlequins and Leicester Tigers.

== Career ==
=== Early life ===
De Carpentier went to Kirkham Grammar School in Lancashire, and played throughout the age groups with schoolmate Kieran Brookes. He is a sports coaching graduate of UWIC.

=== Professional career ===
His first professional contract was at Leicester Tigers He made his England Sevens debut in the Edinburgh leg of the 2011 World Series He had a short spell at Harlequins.

He signed a contract with Bath Rugby on 21 September 2021, ahead of the 2021/22 season due to a successful trial period. On 27 April 2023 De Carpentier announced his retirement from professional rugby union.
