= Listed buildings in Kirkham, Lancashire =

Kirkham is a civil parish in Lancashire, England. It contains 20 buildings that are recorded in the National Heritage List for England as designated listed buildings. Of these, one is listed at Grade II*, the middle grade, and the others are at Grade II. The parish contains the town of Kirkham, and most of the listed buildings are houses, churches, commercial buildings, a public house, a school, and associated structures. The other listed buildings are the fishstones with a lamp standard, a commemorative lamp post, and a telephone kiosk.

== Key ==
Grade	Criteria
II*	Particularly important buildings of more than special interest
II	Buildings of national importance and special interest

== Buildings ==
Name and location	Photograph	Date	Notes	Grade
14 Preston Street; 53.78228°N 2.87086°W	—	1729	A house in stuccoed brick with a tiled roof. It is in three storeys with a cellar, and has a two-bay front. Five steps lead up to a central doorway, above which is a plaque containing the date, initials, and the coat of arms of the London Curriers Company.	II
Sundial, St Michael's Church; 53.78416°N 2.87095°W	—	18th century (probable)	The top of the sundial dates from the 20th century. It is in sandstone and consists of a fluted circular column without a base. This carries a Tuscan capital with a round bronze dial and gnomon.	II
2 Church Street; 53.78272°N 2.87101°W		c. 1765	A brick house with stone dressings and a hipped slate roof. It is in three storeys with a cellar, and has a five-bay front, the central bay projecting forward. Five steps lead up to the central doorway, which has a semicircular architrave with Tuscan pilasters and a pediment on consoles. The windows in the central bay also have moulded architraves. On the corners are chamfered quoins and, at the top of the house, a modillioned cornice.	II
St Michael's Church; 53.78430°N 2.87106°W		1822 (rebuilt)	The church was rebuilt on the foundations of an older church and was designed by Robert Roper. The west steeple was added in 1843–44 by Edmund Sharpe, and the chancel was rebuilt in 1853. The church is built in sandstone with slate roofs, and consists of a nave, a chancel with aisles used as vestries, and a west steeple rising to a height of 150 feet (46 m). The nave is in Early English style, the chancel is in Decorated style, and the steeple is Perpendicular.	II*
4 Church Street; 53.78301°N 2.87098°W	—	Early 19th century	A brick house with stone dressings and a slate roof. It is in three storeys with a cellar, and has a three-bay front. Three steps lead up to a central doorway with a rectangular fanlight, and a moulded architrave with a plain frieze and a cornice. The windows have stone sills and lintels.	II
4 and 6 Freckleton Street; 53.78230°N 2.87145°W	—	Early 19th century	Originally an inn, later converted into houses and a shop, it is in brick with stone dressings and a slate roof. It is in three storeys with an attic. The windows, some of which have been replaced, have stone sills and lintels. In the ground floor are shop windows.	II
Hillside and attached wings 53.78205°N 2.86922°W	—	Early 19th century	The house and attached former stable wings are in brick on a sandstone plinth with stone or stuccoed dressings and a slate roof. The house is in two storeys with cellars and an attic, and has a five-bay front. The central doorway is approached by a double flight of steps, and has engaged Ionic columns, a cornice, and a semi-elliptical fanlight. All the windows are sashes. The house is flanked by two-storey wings containing carriage openings in the lower floor and lunettes above.	II
Tomb, St Michael's Church; 53.78397°N 2.87052°W	—	Early 19th century	The tomb is that of Edward and Dorothy King. It is in sandstone and consists of a chest with clasping pilasters. The inscription records that Edward was Vice Chancellor of the Duchy of Lancaster.	II
Fishstones and lamp standard 53.78258°N 2.87143°W		1829	The fishstones consist of sandstone slabs arranged as two semicircular counters, formerly used to display fish for sale. In the centre is a cast iron lamp standard, added in 1872, and later removed but replaced in 1982. It has a decorative base, a fluted shaft, and three brackets, the central one holding a lamp.	II
32 Poulton Street; 53.78249°N 2.87316°W	—	Early to mid 19th century	A brick house, later used as an office, with stone dressings and a slate roof. It is in three storeys with a cellar, and has a front of two bays. Three steps lead up to a doorway with Tuscan columns, a cornice, and a semi-elliptical fanlight. The windows are sashes with stone sills and lintels. At the front, the area is surrounded by cast iron railings.	II
Tomb, St Michael's Church; 53.78399°N 2.87034°W	—	c. 1836	The tomb is that of Edward and Elizabeth Birley. It is in carboniferous limestone and consists of a Greek sarcophagus on a plinth. It has a monolithic roof-slab.	II
Church of St John the Evangelist; 53.78136°N 2.88566°W		1845	A Roman Catholic church designed by A. W. N. Pugin in early Decorated style. It is built in sandstone with a slate roof, and consists of a nave with clerestory, aisles, a chancel with aisles, a sanctuary, a south porch, and a west steeple with a broach spire containing three tiers of lucarnes. Some of the fittings and furniture were also designed by Pugin, and others result from a refurbishment in 1906.	II
Walls and gateway, Church of St John the Evangelist; 53.78107°N 2.88517°W	—	1845	The churchyard wall and the entrance gateway were designed by A. W. N. Pugin. The wall has a coping in the style of a Mansard roof. The gateway consists of an arch with stepped coping in a similar style. At the rear are buttresses.	II
Railway Hotel; 53.78665°N 2.88421°W		c. 1850	Originally a railway hotel, later a public house, it is built in brick on a stone plinth with stone dressings and a slate roof. It is in two storeys and has a three-bay front. The slightly projecting porch has rusticated quoins and a semicircular arch, and the windows have moulded architraves. At the top of the hotel is a rectangular panel containing the word "HOTEL".	II
Tomb, St Michael's Church; 53.78403°N 2.87021°W		Mid 19th century	The tomb is that of William Birley, his wife and others. It is in sandstone with cast iron railings. The tomb is in the form of a Gothic tabernacle, and each face is elaborately decorated, with four gables, crocketed pinnacles, and a small spire. On each side are inscribed panels.	II
Trustee Savings Bank; 53.78232°N 2.87421°W		1860	This was built as a girls' charity school, and later used as a bank. It is built in brick with sandstone dressings, and is in Gothic Revival style. From the left are a pair of lancet windows, then an arcade of six lancets, and then an arched entrance with a mullioned fanlight. Further to the right is the former teacher's house with a semicircular oriel window rising to a gable, and beyond that is an open arch leading to the rear.	II
Jubilee Lamp; 53.78214°N 2.87543°W		1887	The lamp was erected to celebrate the Golden Jubilee of Queen Victoria. It has an octagonal sandstone inscribed base on which is a decorative cast iron lamp post. This consists of a circular plinth carrying four twisted columns with a single capital. On this is a moulded shaft with a hexagonal lampshade. There is a plaque on the columns with details of a refurbishment in 1988.	II
United Reformed Church; 53.78219°N 2.87522°W		1896–97	Built as a Congregational church, it was designed by Briggs and Wolstenholme. It is in sandstone with a slate roof, and consists of a nave with transepts, and a steeple. In 1995 a single-storey extension with a basement was added to the rear of the church.	II
Grammar School (front range); 53.78140°N 2.88856°W		1909–11	The school was designed by F. H. Greenaway. It is built in rendered brick with sandstone dressings and a green tile roof. There is a long irregular front, with a number of gables, including one in the headmaster's house on the left. The central block is recessed with a porch in the middle, above which is a square clock cupola. To the right is a full-height hall with a canted and battlemented bay window. Further to the right is a single-storey block. All the windows are mullioned and transomed.	II
Telephone kiosk 53.78250°N 2.87220°W	—	1935	A K6 type telephone kiosk, designed by Giles Gilbert Scott. Constructed in cast iron with a square plan and a dome, it has three unperforated crowns in the top panels.	II
