= Kirkham Grammar School =

Coordinates: 53.7814°N 2.8886°W

Location
- Ribby Road; Kirkham, Lancashire, PR4 2BH; England

Information
- Type: Private day and boarding
- Motto: Ingredere Ut Proficias (Enter in order to profit)
- Established: 1549; 477 years ago
- Local authority: Lancashire
- Head: Kirsten O'Donoghue
- Gender: Mixed
- Age: 2 to 18
- Enrolment: 680 pupils (approx.)
- Former pupils: Old Kirkhamians
- Campus: Rural/suburban
- Specialism: Rugby
- Website: http://www.kirkhamgrammar.co.uk

Kirkham Grammar School is a selective, co-educational private day and boarding school in Kirkham, Lancashire, England. It was founded in 1549. Its roots can be traced back to the chantry school attached to St Michael's Church in the 13th century. The school remained in the church grounds until it moved to occupy its present site on Ribby Road in 1911. The front range of the school and the headmaster's house are recorded in the National Heritage List for England as a designated Grade II listed building.

== School history ==
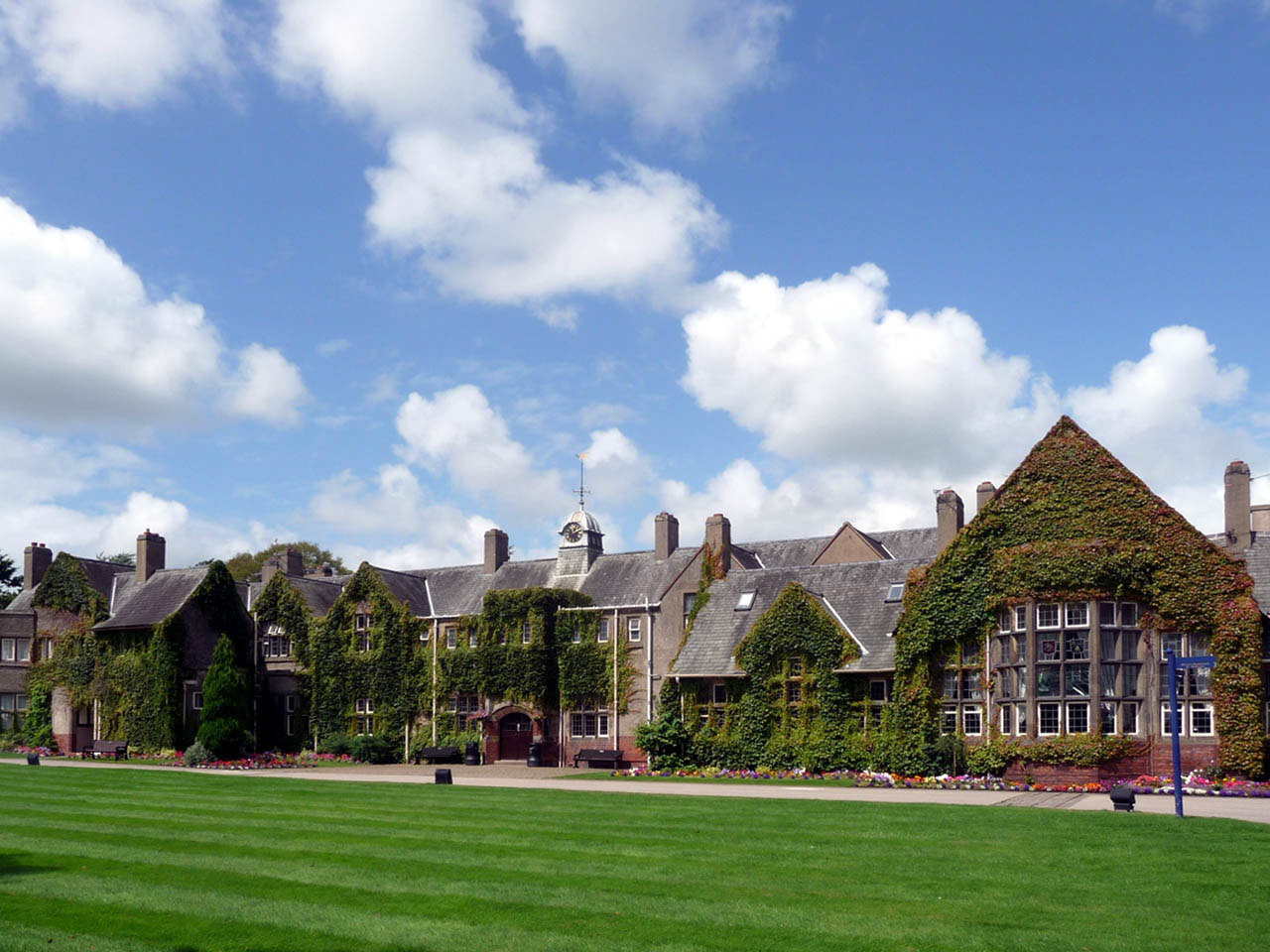
Kirkham Grammar School.

In 1585 the Thirty Men of Kirkham, a group which administered parish business, took control of the school. By the early part of the seventeenth century, the school had fallen into disrepair and had been without a master for seven years. Isabell Birley, an alehouse keeper, came to the rescue in 1621, presenting the Thirty Men of Kirkham with £30 for the restoration of the school.

In 1655 Henry Colburn, an old boy of the school, left money and land to the school in his will, putting it in the trust of the Worshipful Company of Drapers in London. Then began a long partnership between the company and the school, which has continued to the present day, though the Drapers surrendered control of the school in 1944, having endowed it with large extensions in 1938.

The present school building was built between 1909 and 1911 when the front range and the headmaster's house were constructed to a design by the architect F. H. Greenaway of London. In 1944, the school became part of the UK governmental tripartite system as a voluntary-aided boys' grammar school. In 1965 a major extension, the Norwood Science Building was opened. In 1979 the Board of Governors took the decision to revert to independent status and Kirkham Grammar School became a co-educational school for the first time.

The last decade of the 20th century witnessed a rise in pupil numbers from 500 to 900. The school's partnership with BAE Systems was first established in 1994. In July 2013, the school provided accommodation for teenagers attending BAE Systems' "taster weeks"

The school applied to host a Pre-Games Olympic Training Camp before the 2012 Summer Olympics, in London. Andrew Flintoff runs a cricket academy at the school.

In recent years Kirkham Grammar School has produced a number of rugby players who have appeared at the highest level of the sport, Richard Wigglesworth and Kieran Brookes were part of the 2015 England's Six Nations squad, while Kieran Marmion was part of the Ireland squad. In Sevens rugby Daniel Bibby and Richard de Carpentier have represented England in the HSBC World Sevens Series where they came across fellow Old Boy Adam Newton playing for Spain. In 2016 Daniel Bibby became the first alumnus of the school to become an Olympian gaining a silver medal for Great Britain at the Rio Games in Sevens.

== Development ==
The school celebrated its 450th anniversary in 1999 and has undertaken a major development programme with phase one, science laboratories and a classroom project, being completed in November 2005. The second phase, a new £1.5M extension project, was launched in May 2007 to give the school extra facilities with twelve new classrooms. The classrooms, with full Information technology (IT) multimedia teaching aids and access to laptops with wireless Internet facilities, opened in December. A time capsule was buried in the foundations.

In January 2007, the new Lawrence House Pavilion was officially opened with a performance of William Shakespeare's Much Ado About Nothing. The pavilion houses a drama studio, changing rooms, kitchen and a lounge area funded by the Lawrence House Trust, together with the Katie Caine Trust, after which the studio was named and also The Friends of Kirkham Grammar. The pavilion cost £220,000.

In October 2007, the school's sports pitch was relaid with all weather AstroTurf, and with floodlights it is also used by local community partners for sports such as hockey and football. The old pitch was recycled with part of it being used to make new pathways for North Shore Golf Club in Blackpool.

== Nursery School ==
The Nursery School is a purpose built preschool which adjoins the junior school. It was opened in September 2003 at a cost of £250,000.

== Old Kirkhamians ==
- Zachary Langton, clergyman
- Ralph Copeland, astronomer
- Eric Laithwaite, engineer
- Graham Clark, opera singer
- Anthony John Lewis, mathematician and sports statistician
- Alastair Little, celebrity chef
- Clive Tyldesley, football commentator
- Tony Cocker, former Chief Executive of E.ON UK
- Matthew Pateman, Professor of Popular Aesthetics
- Pat Sanderson, rugby union player
- Ranvir Singh, television presenter
- Alex Sanderson, rugby union player
- Mark McQueen, film & TV director
- Richard Wigglesworth, rugby union player
- Kieran Brookes, rugby union player
- Richard de Carpentier, rugby union sevens player
- Daniel Bibby, rugby union sevens player; Olympic Silver Medallist, Rio 2016
- Kieran Marmion, rugby union player
- Kieran Wilkinson, rugby union player
- James Cartmell, actor
- Ray Ingleby, businessman and entrepreneur

== Past Headmasters since 1911 ==
- Reverend Thomas C Walton 1905-1919
- Reverend Cresswell Strange
- Dennis Norwood
- William H Kennedy
- Malcolm J Summerlee
- Barrie Stacey
- Douglas Walker
- Richard Laithwaite
- Daniel Berry
- Deborah Parkinson
- Tallan Gill
- Kirsten O'Donoghue

== See also ==
- Listed buildings in Kirkham, Lancashire
