= Railway Hotel, Kirkham =

Railway Hotel
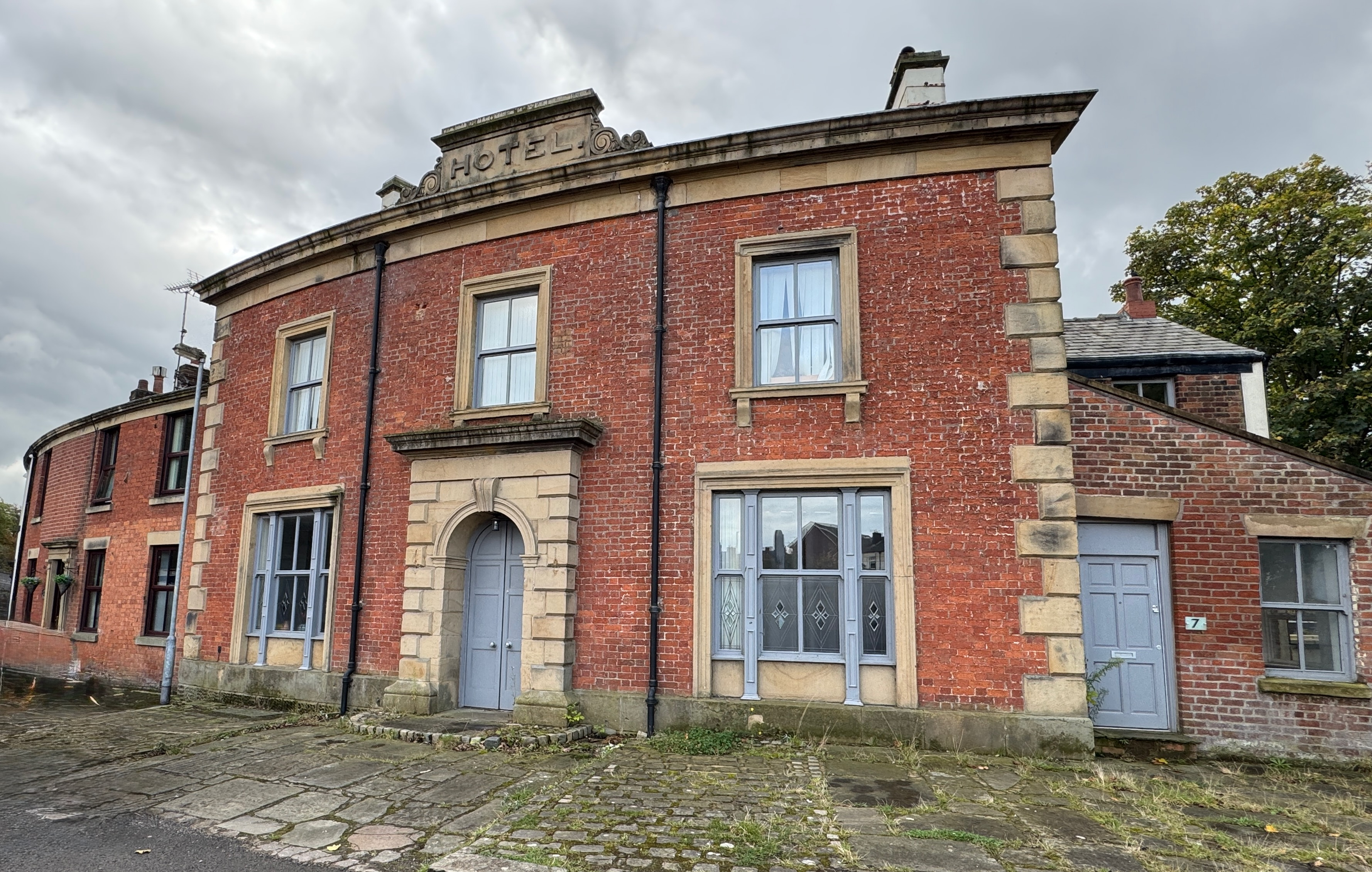
- The building in 2024

- Location within the Borough of Fylde Location within Lancashire
- 53.78665°N 2.88421°W
- Location: Kirkham, Lancashire, England

History
- Built: c. 1850

Site notes
- Area: Borough of Fylde

Listed Building – Grade II
- Designated: 11 June 1986
- Reference no.: 1072026

The Railway Hotel is a building on Station Road in Kirkham, Lancashire, England. It was built around 1850, around a decade after the Preston and Wyre Railway arrived at Kirkham, and has been designated a Grade II listed building by Historic England since 1986. The Station Road on which it stands is the "lower" section, beneath today's B5192 "upper" Station Road, which passes Kirkham and Wesham railway station.

Originally a railway hotel, later a public house, it is built in brick on a stone plinth with stone dressings and a slate roof. It is in two storeys and has a three-bay front. The slightly projecting porch has rusticated quoins and a semicircular arch, and the windows have moulded architraves. On top of the building is metal lettering forming the word "THE RAILWAY", while at the roof line, above the door, is a rectangular moulding containing the word "HOTEL".

In 1996, when the property was in operation as the Railway Inn, a network of tunnels was found behind the building's cellars. It is believed another building once stood on the site, possibly Walton Hall.

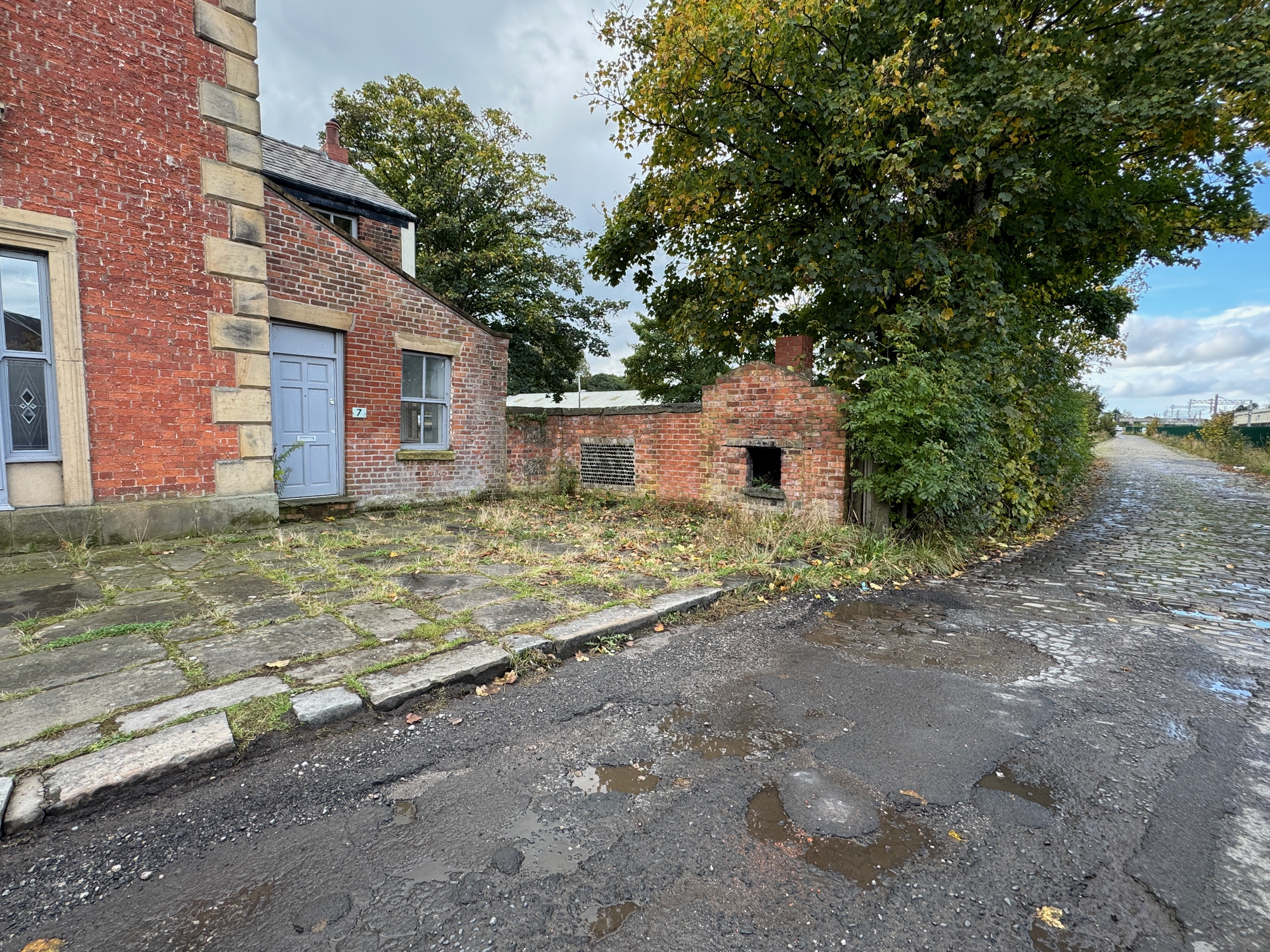
More of its property frontage

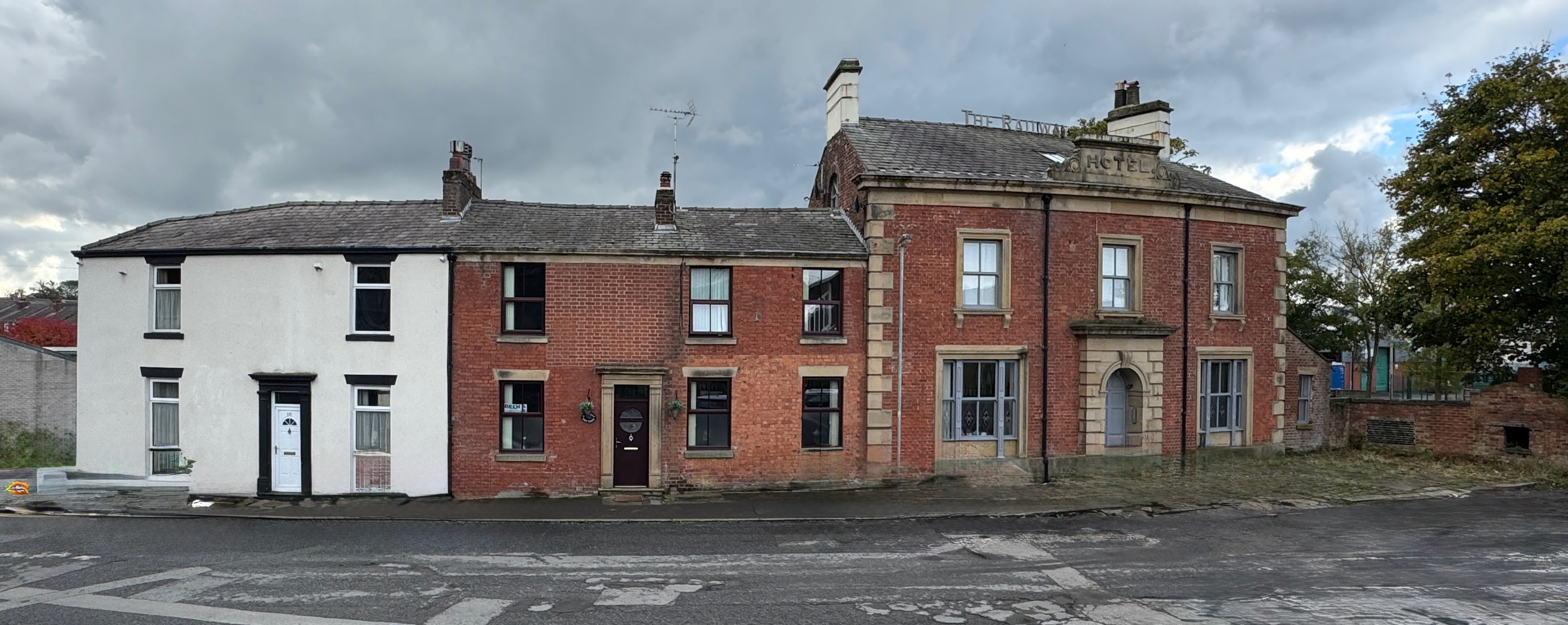
Neighbouring buildings. Note its rooftop signage

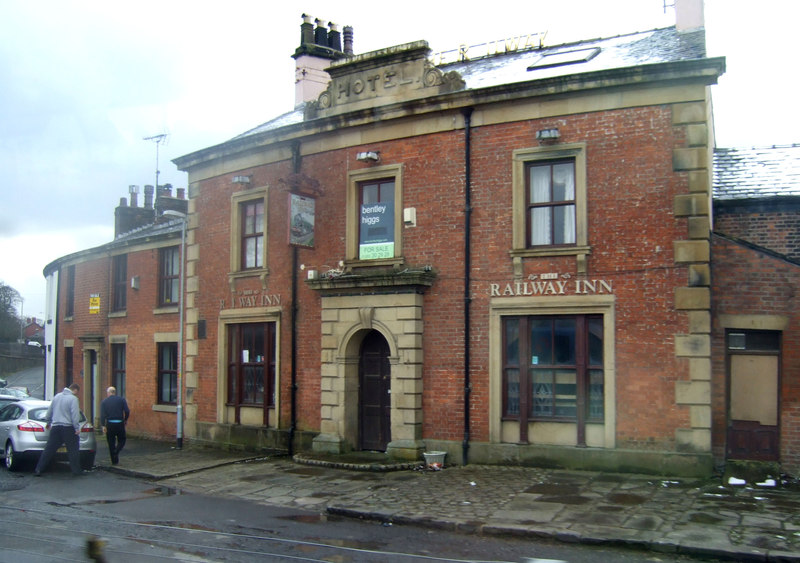
Pictured in 2013, when it was the Railway Inn

== See also ==
- Listed buildings in Kirkham, Lancashire
