= Alex Sanderson =

England international rugby union player

- Born: Alex Sanderson; 7 October 1979 (age 47) Chester, Cheshire, England
- Height: 6 ft 2 in (1.88 m)
- Weight: 16 st 1 lb (102 kg)
- School: Kirkham Grammar School
- Notable relative: Pat Sanderson

Rugby union career
- Position: Back Row
- Current team: Retired
Youth career
- Littleborough RUFC
Senior career
Years	Team	Apps	(Points)
1998 - 04	Sale Sharks	90	(30)
2004 - 05	Saracens	8	(0)
International career
Years	Team	Apps	(Points)
2001–2003	England	5	(5)
Coaching career
- Years: Team
- 2008–2021: Saracens (Asst.)
- 2021–: Sale Sharks

Alexander Sanderson (born 7 October 1979 in Chester) is an English former rugby union footballer who played in the back row during the 1990s and 2000s for Saracens and Sale Sharks. He is the brother of Pat Sanderson who also played rugby for Littleborough RUFC. He is currently Director of Rugby at Sale Sharks.

His rugby career blossomed under coach Brian Gornall at Kirkham Grammar School. His first Sale coach, John Mitchell, also had a great influence on him as did Steve Diamond and Jim Mallinder, both of whom he played alongside when he broke into the first team.

He scored a try on his England debut after coming on as a replacement against Romania in November 2001, having captained the England midweek side in North America soon after being selected for the England XV against the Barbarians at Twickenham. He made his Six Nations debut as a replacement against Italy in March 2003 and was part of the wider 43-man squad for the Rugby World Cup, playing in the pre-Rugby World Cup warm-up matches against Wales and France in Marseille.

He was forced to retire from rugby in 2005 due to a back injury.

After a 17-year association with Saracens it was announced in January 2021 that Sanderson had been appointed Sale Sharks' Director of Rugby.

== International tries ==
Try	Opposing team	Location	Venue	Competition	Date	Result	Score
1	Romania	London, England	Twickenham Stadium	2001 Autumn Internationals	17 November 2001	Win	134 – 0
