= St John the Evangelist's Church, Kirkham =

Coordinates: 53.7814°N 2.8857°W

St John the Evangelist's Church
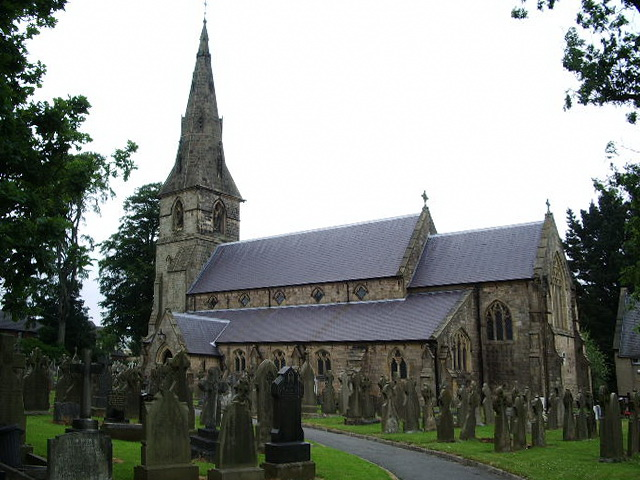
- St John's from the southeast

- Location in the Borough of Fylde
- OS grid reference: SD 417 320
- Location: Ribby Road, Kirkham, Lancashire
- Country: England
- Denomination: Roman Catholic
- Website: Parish of the Holy Cross

History
- Status: Parish church
- Dedication: Saint John the Evangelist
- Consecrated: 22 April 1845

Architecture
- Functional status: Active
- Heritage designation: Grade II
- Designated: 11 June 1986
- Architect: A. W. N. Pugin
- Architectural type: Church
- Style: Gothic Revival
- Groundbreaking: 1842
- Completed: 1845

Specifications
- Materials: Sandstone, slate roofs

Administration
- Diocese: Lancaster
- Parish: Holy Cross

Clergy
- Priest: Revd Andrew Broster

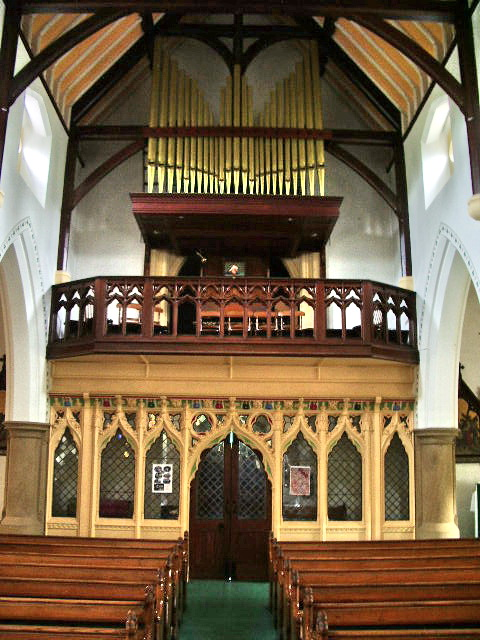
Former rood screen, by Pugin, now moved to the west end of the church

St John the Evangelist's Church (also known as The Willows) is in Ribby Road, Kirkham, Lancashire, England. It is an active Roman Catholic parish church in the diocese of Lancaster. The church was designed by A. W. N. Pugin, and is recorded in the National Heritage List for England as a designated Grade II listed building.

== History ==
In 1809 the first Roman Catholic chapel was built in Kirkham. It was dedicated to the Holy Cross, and was known as "The Willows" because it was in an area surrounded by willow trees. This name is still associated with the present church. The chapel was replaced by the present church, which was built between 1842 and 1845 and was designed by A. W. N. Pugin. Said to have cost £10,000 (equivalent to £1,050,000 in 2025), the church was designed to hold 500–600 people and was heated by underfloor hot air provided by a furnace. The only lighting, however, was by hand-held candles.

The church was consecrated on 22 April 1845 by Rt Revd George Brown, the Roman Catholic bishop of Liverpool. The following day, St George's Day, a formal opening took place with four bishops, other clergy, and 200 guests brought by special train from Preston. After a procession, the terce was sung by the priests and a choir from St. Augustine's, Preston then sang a High Mass with music from Mozart and Haydn. The sermon was by Scottish Bishop Murdock followed by a Te Deum.

From 1895 the parish priest was Fr Francis John Gillow who made some alterations to the interior of the church. The floor was lowered by about 2 feet (61 cm) and the steps at the west entrance were removed. At the same time Pugin's altar was moved to a side chapel and the rood screen was relocated to the west end of the church and altered to fit. (Note: Local writer and Preston Chronicle proprietor Anthony Hewitson ("Atticus"), in his 1872 Our Country Churches and Chapels, considered the roof screen to be "a gem", but unsuitable for modern liturgical requirements. When it was moved to the rear of the church it was too narrow and two additional panels, carved from wood, had to be added. When tapped they give a different sound to the rest of the screen. The crucifixion scene which surmounted it is now high up above the sanctuary arch.) In 1906 Gillow installed a new main altar, a pulpit, benches, and Stations of the Cross.

In 2011 the parish was linked with that of St Joseph, Wesham, and in 2013 the two joined to become the Parish of the Holy Cross.

In the 1930s the church social club had its own snooker team which won a couple of trophies. The church website maintains links to a number of documents of historical interest.

== Architecture ==
=== Exterior ===
The church is built in sandstone from Longridge, and has slate roofs. It is in early Decorated style. It has a five-bay nave with a clerestory and aisles, a south porch, a chancel also with aisles, and a sanctuary without aisles. To the northeast is a vestry block, and at the west end a steeple. The tower has angle buttresses and a stair tower at the southeast corner. There is a moulded west doorway, above which is a two-light window, and a small window to the ringers' chamber. The bell openings have two openings, and above them is a continuous hood mould around the whole tower. On the tower is a broach spire with three tiers of lucarnes and a coronet of blind lucarnes. The spire rises to 100 feet (30.5 m). The gables at the east ends of the nave and the sanctuary have cross finials. Along the sides of the clerestory are five quatrefoil windows with hood moulds. Most of the windows along the aisles have two lights, and the east window has three lights.

=== Interior ===
Inside the church the five-bay arcade is carried on round piers with tall plinths. There is an organ gallery at the west end. The Lady chapel is at the southeast of the church, and the Sacred Heart Chapel is at the northeast. A few items of church furniture designed by Pugin are still in use, including a triple sedilia, credence table, prie-dieu and candlesticks. Pugin's rood screen was moved to the west end in 1895–6. It is in Caen stone, painted brown, and has a wide central ogee arch flanked by three similar but smaller arches on each side. The painted rood figures, representing the Crucifixion, and also by Pugin, hang on the chancel arch. Pugin's altar has been moved into the Sacred Heart chapel, and has been altered. The other fittings date from the 1906 refurbishment. These include the high altar, in Carrara marble and alabaster, and the elaborate pulpit, also in marble and alabaster. Around the church is a colourful scheme of stained glass windows, dating from the mid-19th century or later. The two-manual pipe organ was built in 1846 by J. C. Bishop of London, and was repaired in 1976 by the Pendlebury Organ Company of Cleveleys.

=== Bells ===
There is a ring of six bells, all cast in 1844 by Charles and George Mears of the Whitechapel Bell Foundry. They have been described as the first peal of bells to have been rung in an English Catholic church since the Reformation.

== External features ==
The churchyard walls and the gateway were also designed by Pugin, and are built in the same stone as the church. The wall runs along Ribby Road and has copings with the appearance of a Mansard roof. The gateway is in the form of an arch. Its top is stepped and has coping similar to that on the wall. The arch is pointed and chamfered, and behind it are buttresses.

== Appraisal ==
The church along with the churchyard walls and gateway were designated as Grade II listed buildings on 11 June 1986. Grade II is the lowest of the three grades of listing and is applied to "buildings of national importance and special interest". The architectural historian Nikolaus Pevsner, writing in 1969, says of the church and its architect: "It is a modest building and, like so much of Pugin's, really very impersonal".

== See also ==
- Listed buildings in Kirkham, Lancashire
