= Fred Marquis =

English footballer (1899–1957)

Personal information
- Full name: Fred Marquis
- Date of birth: 15 June 1899
- Place of birth: Kirkham, Lancashire, England
- Date of death: 1957 (aged 57–58)
- Position: Inside forward

Senior career*
| Years | Team | Apps | (Gls) |
| 1918–1919 | Rushden Town | | |
| 1919–1920 | Lancaster Town | | |
| 1920–1925 | Preston North End | 35 | (9) |
| 1925–1927 | Tranmere Rovers | 70 | (32) |
| 1929–1930 | Lancaster Town | | |
| Total | | 105 | (41) |
- * Club domestic league appearances and goals

Fred Marquis (15 June 1899 – 1957) was an English footballer who played in the Football League for Preston North End and Tranmere Rovers.
