= Ray Ingleby =

English businessman and entrepreneur (born 1963)

- Born: Raymond Ingleby; February 1963; Lytham St Annes, Lancashire, England
- Known for: Businessman, entrepreneur

Raymond "Ray" Ingleby (born February 1963) is an English businessman and entrepreneur who was vice-chairman of Burnley Football Club until 27 August 2013. He was born in Lytham St Annes, Lancashire and his family owned a soft furnishings firm. Despite being sacked from his first job in a magazine-printing firm, he became a millionaire by the age of 21. He was the founder of Ingleby Communications, which in 1992 bought out American firm Caribiner. During his seven years in charge of the company, Caribiner became the biggest audio-visual rental business in the world with a turnover of $750 million. In February 1999, Ingleby purchased £1 million worth of shares in Burnley F.C. and was later elected vice-chairman.

== Early life ==
Ingleby was born, in February 1963, in Lytham St Annes, Lancashire the son of the owners of a soft furnishings company. He was diagnosed with dyslexia and struggled at school, and did not learn to read and write until the age of nine. He passed his eleven plus exam, however, and attended Kirkham Grammar School where he showed a particular flair for Economics. He excelled at sports and was a keen athlete and rugby player. He continued his studies until A-Level, before leaving education at the age of 18.

== Business career ==
Upon leaving school Ingleby got his first job, selling advertising space for a local magazine-printing business. At the age of 19, he was promoted to head of sales. Soon afterwards, the firm was bought out by a public limited company and Ingleby took an avid interest in the workings of a PLC. In 1983, he lost his job at the firm but the same year he founded the Ingleby Group, a Blackpool-based company that specialised in selling advertising space in display cabinets in hotel foyers. After just one year, the company was valued at £1 million and Ingleby started to increase his business acumen. Ingelby purchased Rose Publicity in 1986 and owned the company for two years before selling it for £13 million. As part of the deal, Ingleby agreed not to compete with the purchasers in Britain and Europe.

Ingleby subsequently moved to the United States, originally for three years, to pursue further business interests. His first move in America was to start up Ingleby Communications, a group of companies that staged corporate events. The business was worth $4 million and in 1992 Ingleby bought out Caribiner and took on the company's name. He expanded Caribiner and the firm had departments for web development, equipment rental and sales training programmes, amongst other interests. In 1996, the company was floated on the New York Stock Exchange. In 1998, Caribiner announced a massive turnover of $750 million, becoming the biggest audio-visual equipment rental company in the world. However, the company's fortunes took a sharp downturn and Ingleby resigned as chairman in May 1999 after seven years in charge of Caribiner. Following this, he returned to England and was appointed Executive Chairman of IT investment group Axiomlab.

== Football interests ==
Despite being a Chelsea supporter as a youth, Ingleby expressed an interest in buying Burnley and made an offer for the club in January 1998. The bid was unsuccessful, but the following year he bought over £1 million worth of shares in Burnley and joined the board of directors in February 1999. Soon afterwards, Barry Kilby was elected to be chairman of the board and Ingleby was appointed vice-chairman, a position which he held until 27 August 2010, when he resigned from the board. It was later disclosed that Ingleby had been declared bankrupt four days earlier.
