= John Whiteside (curator) =

British museum curator (1679–1729)

John Whiteside FRS
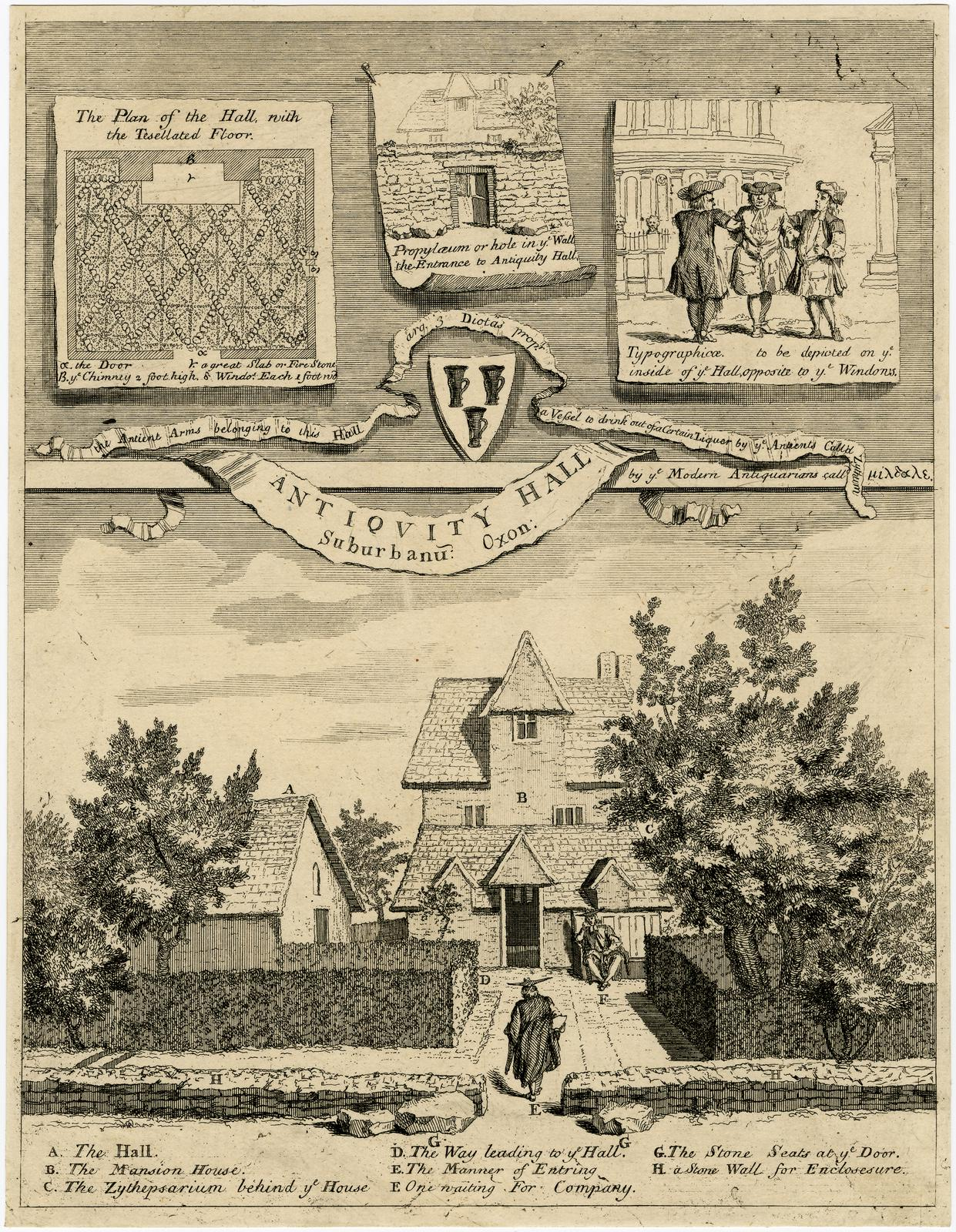
- Antiquity Hall Suburbanu Oxon (c.1720), including the only know image of Whiteside
- Born: 1679; England
- Died: 12 October 1729 (aged 49–50)
- Education: Brasenose College, Oxford
- Occupations: Chaplain; Museum keeper
- Employer(s): Christ Church, Oxford; Ashmolean Museum
- Known for: Keeper of the Ashmolean Museum
- Father: George Whiteside

John Whiteside FRS (1679 – 12 October 1729) was an English chaplain, museum curator, experimental philosopher, and astronomer. He was Keeper (head) of the Ashmolean Museum at the University of Oxford.

== Life ==
John Whiteside was born in 1679. He was the son of George Whiteside, a glazier from Kirkham, Lancashire. In 1696, he entered Brasenose College, Oxford, gaining a BA degree in 1700 and an MA degree in 1704). He was the chaplain at Christ Church, Oxford, and the Keeper (head) of the Ashmolean Museum from 14 December 1714 until his death on 12 October 1729. He was elected as Fellow of the Royal Society in 1718.

Whiteside was a natural philosopher and astronomer. Edmond Halley communicated two of Whiteside's astronomical observations to the Royal Society. However, he was unsuccessful in becoming the Savilian Professor of Astronomy. He gave lectures in experimental philosophy. In his role as Keeper of the Ashmolean Museum, he bought new scientific equipment at his own expense, creating a large collection of apparatus, including a clock made by George Graham (1673–1751), the inventor of the mercury compensation pendulum. Whiteside assisted John Anstis (1669–1744), who was the Garter Knight of Arms, with his 1724 edition of Elias Ashmole's Register of the Most Noble Order of the Garter. Whiteside worked on recreating and augmenting the museum's fossil collection, accepting specimens provided by the Master of University College, Arthur Charlett. He also supplemented and organised the museum's numismatics collection. During Whiteside's time at the Ashmolean, the 9th-century Alfred Jewel was given to the museum by Nathaniel Palmer in 1718.

The only known depiction of Whiteside is in an etching/engraving of the tavern Antiquity Hall Suburbanum Oxon (c.1720), where he is satirised due to his antiquarian interests by the engraver George Vertue (1684–1756). This includes three men who are arm in arm (specifically, the librarian Humphrey Wanley, the antiquarian Thomas Hearne, and John Whiteside), standing outside the Sheldonian Theatre in central Oxford.
