= Carr Hill High School =

Location
- Kirkham, Lancashire, PR4 2ST; England
- Coordinates: 53.7794°N 2.8672°W

Information
- Type: Community school
- Established: 1958
- Local authority: Lancashire
- Department for Education URN: 119744 Tables
- Ofsted: Reports
- Gender: Mixed
- Age: 11 to 16
- Enrolment: 850 pupils
- Colour: 5
- Website: http://www.carrhillschool.com

Carr Hill High School is an 11–16, mixed comprehensive school in Kirkham, Lancashire, England. The school has approximately 900 pupils currently enrolled. It has a learning library centre including a library area, an IT suite and a conference room, collectively known as 'The Hub'. There is an English Language and R.E block as well as Cookery, D.T, Performing Arts, maths block and P.E blocks. The school also has a Sports Dome, Dance Studio and Fitness Suite.

From September 2024, the school joined the Education Partnership Trust and is under new leadership. The new Headteacher also joined in September 2024.

== School history ==
The school was opened to the first pupils for the autumn term in 1957 and later officially opened by the Duchess of Kent in 1958.

The first headmaster was a Mr R. Simpson. At this time the school had four academic years as pupils would leave after their 14th birthday. A fifth year was added in 1961 for 'A' stream pupils to take their 'O' level GCE exams. The school was split into four 'houses'; Parker, Langton, Birley and Shaw, these names were based on local prominent families. The houses formed the foundation for competition in both academic and sporting areas. Carr Hill is the second Fylde school to remove its sixth form.
