= Pat Sanderson =

England international rugby union player

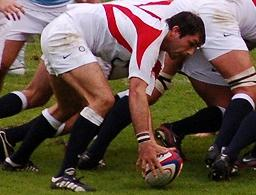
- Born: Patty 'Harry' Sanderson; 6 September 1977 (age 49) Chester, Cheshire, England
- Height: 1.91 m (6 ft 3 in)
- Weight: 102 kg (16 st 1 lb)
- School: Bury Grammar School; Kirkham Grammar School
- Notable relative: Alex Sanderson

Rugby union career
- Position(s): Flanker, Number eight
Senior career
Years	Team	Apps	(Points)
1997–1998	Sale	37	(35)
1999–2004	Harlequins	65	(50)
2004–2011	Worcester	104	(75)
International career
Years	Team	Apps	(Points)
1998–2007	England	16	(5)

Pat Sanderson (born 6 September 1977 in Chester) is a former England international rugby union player and a former flanker for Worcester. He is the brother of the former England player Alex Sanderson. He began his rugby union career at Bury Grammar School, Littleborough RUFC and then at Kirkham Grammar School and included his first international cap for the England 16 Group Schools team. For the 1994/95 and 1995/96 seasons he played for Preston Grasshoppers Colts. The Colts won the Lancashire County Rugby Football Union Colts Cup in both seasons, in the latter season he played alongside his brother, Alex Sanderson, the future England Captain, Steve Borthwick, and John Kirkpatrick (rugby league). He joined Manchester Sale (now Sale Sharks) in 1996 and was capped by England U21s and England A. He moved to Harlequins where he played in the 2001 Powergen Cup final, when Quins lost to Newcastle by 30–27.

Sanderson was first capped on England's 1998 southern hemisphere tour as a 20-year-old, facing New Zealand twice and South Africa, and he won another three caps on the 2001 tour to North America, during which he scored a try against the United States.

At the end of the 2003–04 season he moved to newly promoted Worcester Warriors, as captain, helping the Warriors retain their Premiership status. He started every Premiership game last in 2004/5 and Sanderson was nominated for Zurich Player of the Season 2004–05 and the PRA Players' Player of the Year. This consistency resulted in an England recall for the autumn test opener against Australia in November 2005. After featuring in the 2005 autumn internationals and being made captain for England's tour to Australia in 2006, he fell out of favour with England when Brian Ashton replaced Andy Robinson as coach in late 2006 and did not feature since.

Sanderson had been a long-serving player at Worcester Warriors. He has played over 100 top flight games and scored 22 tries for Worcester and has again being named as club captain for the 2008/09 season by Director of Rugby for Worcester Mike Ruddock.

Sanderson also played sevens, having made his debut back in 1997 in Hong Kong. In 2003–04 he played in six of the IRB World Series rounds including the three wins in South Africa, Hong Kong and London. England won the Hong Kong event that year. In 2002 he was also a member of England's Commonwealth Games squad in Manchester.

Sanderson is the chairman of The Professional Rugby Players' Association having experienced several injuries during his career. A fractured shoulder, two damaged knees and prolapsed disc have all kept him out of the game at different stages. Sanderson is also now the players representative of the This is Rugby campaign, in association with the Professional Rugby Players' Association, Premier Rugby Limited and the RFU, to promote the Core Values of rugby following a spate of disreputable incidents in professional premiership rugby.

Sanderson committed his future to Worcester Warriors on the eve of the 2007–08 season by agreeing a new two-year deal, which would see him remain at Sixways until 2010.

In August 2011, Sanderson was forced to retire from rugby after failing to recover from a shoulder injury.

Sporting positions
Preceded by Martin Corry	England national rugby union team captain Jun 2006	Succeeded by Martin Corry
