= Kieran Brookes =

English rugby union footballer

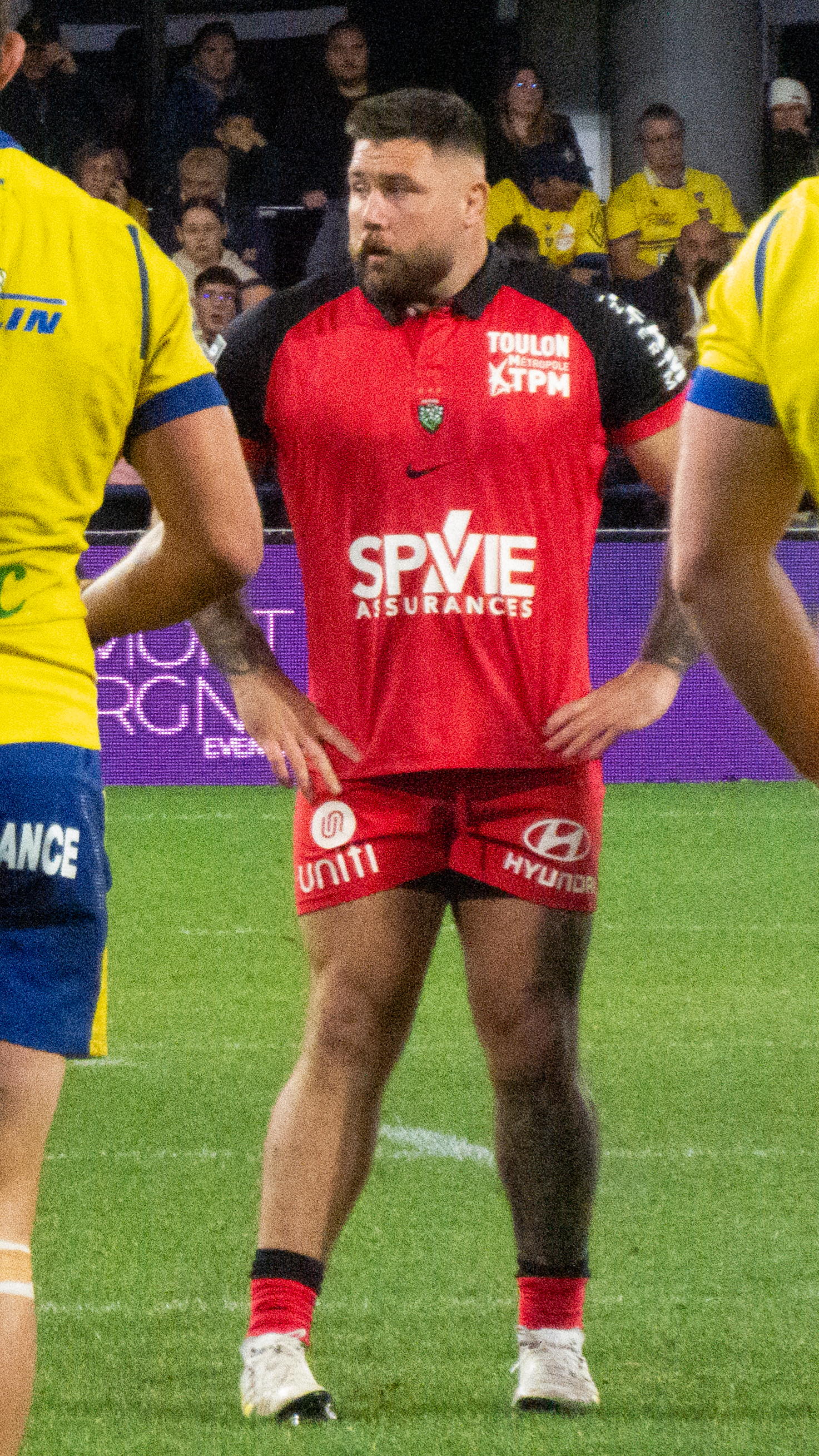
- Brookes in 2023
- Born: Kieran Brookes; 29 August 1990 (age 36) Stoke on Trent, Staffordshire, England
- Height: 1.88 m (6 ft 2 in)
- Weight: 129 kg (20 st 4 lb)
- School: Lytham St Annes High School; Kirkham Grammar School

Rugby union career
- Position: Loosehead Prop, Tighthead Prop Hooker
Amateur team(s)
Years	Team	Apps	(Points)
1999–2009	Fylde		
Senior career
Years	Team	Apps	(Points)
2008–2009	Fylde	8	(5)
2009–2011	Newcastle Falcons	41	(0)
2009–2010	→ Tynedale	5	(10)
2011–2013	Leicester Tigers	6	(0)
2012–2013	→ Loughborough Students	3	(5)
2012–2013	→ Doncaster Knights	4	(0)
2013–2015	Newcastle Falcons	43	(0)
2015–2018	Northampton Saints	74	(0)
2018–2021	Wasps	55	(5)
2021–2024	Toulon	70	(5)
2024–2026	Perpignan	46	(0)
2026-	Munster	6	(0)
- Correct as of 31 October 2026
International career
Years	Team	Apps	(Points)
2010	England U20	1	(0)
2011	England Saxons	2	(10)
2014–2016	England	16	(0)
- Correct as of 10 March 2017

Kieran Brookes (born 29 August 1990) is an English rugby union player who plays for Munster Rugby and played for England. He usually plays as a tighthead prop, but can also cover as a loosehead prop. He was educated at Kirkham Grammar School.

== Club career ==
Brookes made almost 40 senior appearances for Newcastle but only started 1 game in the 2009–2010 season.

Brookes moved to Leicester Tigers for the 2011–12 season.

Having returned to the Newcastle Falcons on loan from Leicester Tigers in March 2013, he signed a two-year contract to stay with the Falcons in April 2013.

On 13 January 2015, it was announced that Brookes would be joining Northampton Saints at the end of the 2014–15 season.

Brookes became a regular starter for the East Midlands side and racked up numerous appearances at his time at Saints.

The prop helped Saints to secure European Champions Cup rugby for the 2017/18 season, featuring in both play-off games as Saints beat Connacht Rugby and Stade Français Paris to seal the last spot in the top tier of European rugby for the following season.

On 13 June 2018, Brookes signed for Premiership rivals Wasps from the 2018–19 season.

On 9 June 2021, it was widely confirmed that Brookes would leave Wasps at the end of the season to join top French side Toulon in the Top 14 competition ahead of the 2021–22 season. On 19 January 2024, Brookes would sign a two-year deal for French rivals Perpignan from the 2024–25 season.

== International career ==
Although born in England, Brookes played at many underage levels for Ireland, including U-18, U-19 and U-20.

Brookes has committed himself to the England rugby team, playing for England in an uncapped match against the Barbarians and for the England Saxons in their successful Churchill Cup campaign in the summer of 2011. In May 2014 he was called up to England's training squad for the tour of New Zealand, where he earned himself his first two caps for his country.

Since making his senior debut for England in that tour, Brookes has taken to the field for England 16 times. He was a member of the 2015 Rugby World Cup squad and was included in the squad for the 2016 Six Nations and after joining the squad on 1 February, coming back from an injury, helped his country to a Grand Slam victory.

The summer of 2016 saw Brookes become part of the England Saxons squad once more where he travelled to South Africa to face South Africa 'A' where the men in white secured a 2–0 series win.
