= St Michael's Church, Kirkham =

Coordinates: 53.7843°N 2.8710°W

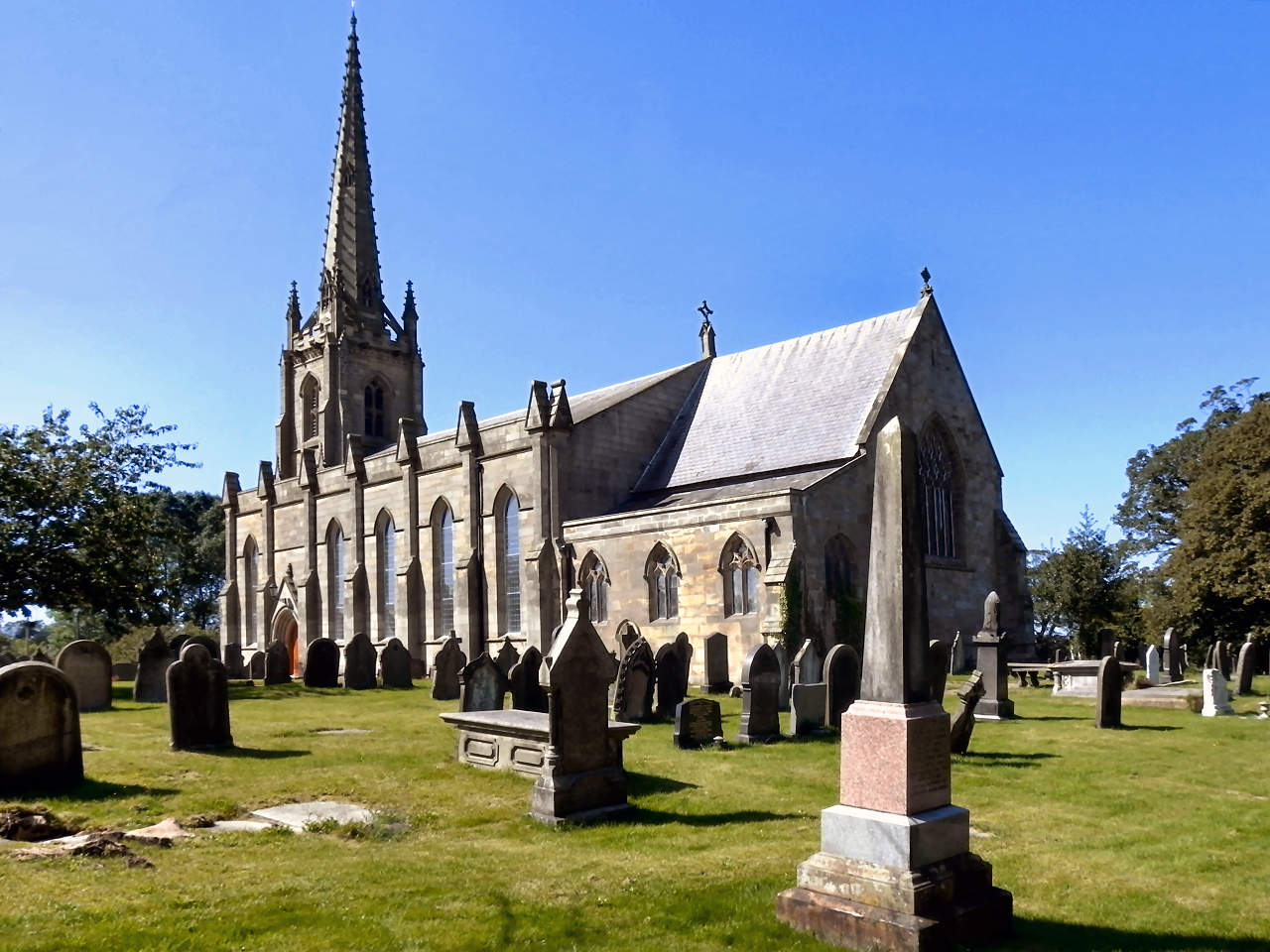
- St Michael's Church, Kirkham, from the southeast

- Location in the Borough of Fylde
- OS grid reference: SD 427,323
- Location: Church Street, Kirkham, Lancashire
- Country: England
- Denomination: Anglican
- Website: Official website

History
- Status: Parish church
- Dedication: St Michael

Architecture
- Functional status: Active
- Heritage designation: Grade II*
- Designated: 20 September 1985
- Architect(s): Robert Roper, Edmund Sharpe, Joseph Hansom (?)
- Architectural type: Church
- Style: Gothic Revival
- Groundbreaking: 1822
- Completed: 1853
- Construction cost: £5,000 (nave) (equivalent to £550,000 in 2025)

Specifications
- Capacity: 600
- Materials: Ashlar sandstone, slate roofs

Administration
- Province: York
- Diocese: Blackburn
- Archdeaconry: Lancaster
- Deanery: Kirkham
- Parish: Kirkham

Clergy
- Vicar: Fr Richard Dashwood

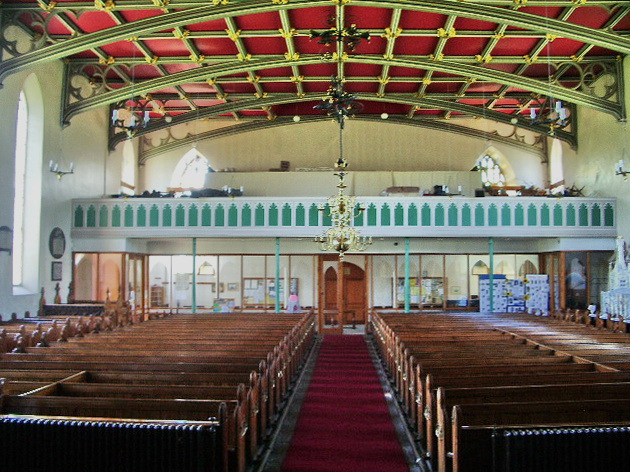
Interior of the church

St Michael's Church is in the town of Kirkham, Lancashire, England. The church is recorded in the National Heritage List for England as a designated Grade II* listed building. It is an active Anglican parish church in the diocese of Blackburn, the archdeaconry of Lancaster and the deanery of Kirkham.

== History ==
The earliest evidence of a church on the site is in 684 AD. Kirkham was one of the oldest foundations in Lancashire and one of only three listed in the Domesday Book of 1086 as existing in Amounderness. This hundred was part of the vast possessions of Roger earl of Poictou and the church was held by the Priory Church of St. Mary, Lancaster. William of York (died 1154) issued a charter to return the church to Shrewsbury Abbey. In a later charter, dated 5 December 1280, King Edward I conveyed the advowson of Kirkham to the abbot and convent of Vale Royal Abbey which held the church until the dissolution in the reign King Henry VIII. It was then given to the dean and chapter of Christ Church, Oxford.

The first recorded vicar, in May 1239, was Will de Ebor, also described as "Cancus de Ebor" and said to have been appointed by Richard Duke of Cornwall.

The first christenings recorded in the parish register are those of Thomas Sharrock and Henry Cowbron in March 1539. Porter also notes that the monumental inscriptions in the church ".. are not either very ancient or very numersous", with the oldest being that of Richard Clegg, M.A., made vicar on 22 June 1666, let into the floor of the vestry.

The fabric of the present church dates from 1822 when the nave, designed by Robert Roper, an architect from Preston, was built. The cost of the nave was £5,000 (equivalent to £550,000 in 2025). In 1843–44 the steeple, designed by the Lancaster architect Edmund Sharpe, and built in Longridge stone, was added at the west end. The foundation stone for this was laid on 21 November 1843 by Thomas Clifton of Lytham Hall. In 1853 the chancel was rebuilt, probably by Joseph Hansom, to make the altar visible from the nave. The north and south galleries were removed in the middle of the 20th century and the area under the west gallery has been turned into a separate room. In 2004 it was discovered that the spire had developed structural problems because the iron ties reinforcing the stones had corroded. An appeal to repair the spire was launched.

== Architecture ==
=== Exterior ===
The church is built in sandstone ashlar with slate roofs. Its plan consists of a six-bay nave without aisles, a three-bay chancel with aisles which are now used as vestries. To the north and south gabled porches project slightly from the second bays from west. The other bays have lancet windows between gabled buttresses. The nave is in Early English style and the chancel is in Decorated style. The steeple is in Perpendicular style. It has angle buttresses and is in four stages. The parapet is embattled and pinnacles rise from the corners. The octagonal spire is recessed and rises to a height of 150 feet (46 m). It is crocketed, has three tiers of two-light lucarnes and is supported by four flying buttresses. The authors of the Buildings of England series consider it to be "perhaps the finest work of Edmund Sharpe".

=== Interior ===
The roof of the nave is painted red and is divided into squares by ribs, at whose intersections are gilded bosses of different designs. The font is located halfway down the north side of the nave. It is Victorian and consists of an octagonal gabled and crocketted bowl on an octagonal column. The wooden pulpit is massive, measuring approximately 125 feet (38 m) from the base to the top. To the east of the south door are churchwardens' box pews carved with Gothic details and poppyheads. They bear a brass plate dated 1770. In the nave are monuments to the memory of the Cliftons of Lytham Hall, including one to Thomas Clifton who died in 1688. A wall tablet commemorates Richard Bradkirk of Bryning Hall who died in 1813 and another monument is to Henry Rishton Buck, a lieutenant aged 27 who died at the Battle of Waterloo. Behind the Lady Chapel altar is a folding reredos dated 1900 which was made by Kempe and moved from Christ Church Cathedral, Oxford. The brass chandelier dated 1725 was made by Brown of Wigan. The organ dates back to 1769 when it was built by Glyn Parker of Salford. Later modifications were made by R. W. Nicholson of Bradford (at an unrecorded date), by Harrison & Harrison in 1905, and by the Pendlebury Organ Company of Cleveleys in 1979. There is a ring of eight bells which were cast by Charles & George Mears at the Whitechapel Bell Foundry in 1846.

== External features ==
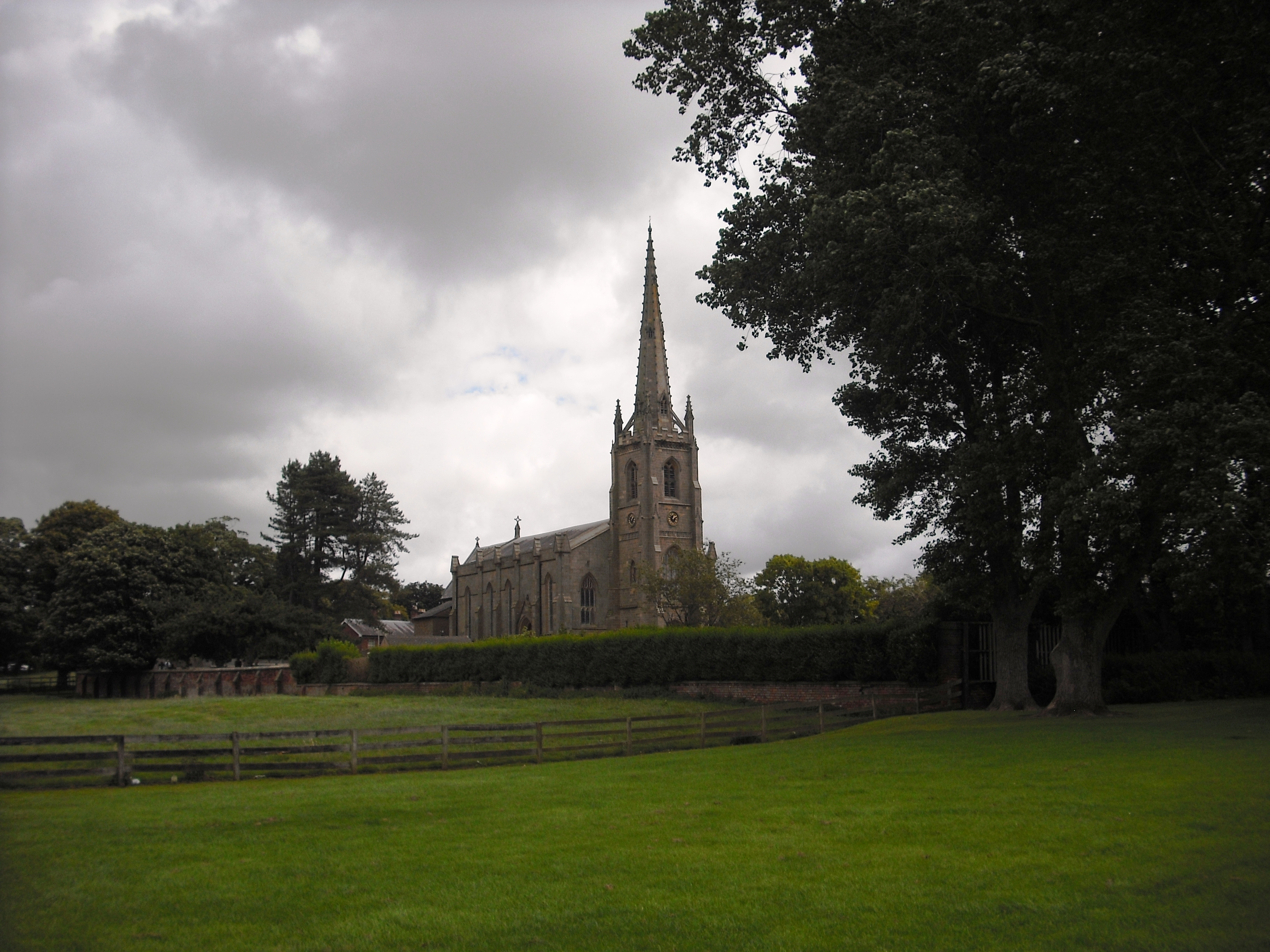
St Michael's from Barnfield

In the churchyard is a sundial made of sandstone dating probably from the 18th century with a 20th-century top. It consists of a fluted circular column without a base set into a circular slab and capped with a Tuscan capital which carries a round bronze dial and a gnomon. It is listed at Grade II. Also in the churchyard and listed Grade II are a tomb chest to Edward and Dorothy King dating from the early 19th century, a tomb chest to Edward and Elizabeth Birley dating from around 1836, and a monument in the style of a Gothic tabernacle to William Birley and others dating from the middle of the 19th century. The churchyard and its extension contain the war graves of three service personnel of World War I, and ten of World War II.

== See also ==
- Grade II* listed buildings in Lancashire
- Listed buildings in Kirkham, Lancashire
- List of architectural works by Edmund Sharpe
