= Kirkham, Lancashire =

Town in Lancashire, England

Coordinates: 53.782°N 2.870°W

Kirkham
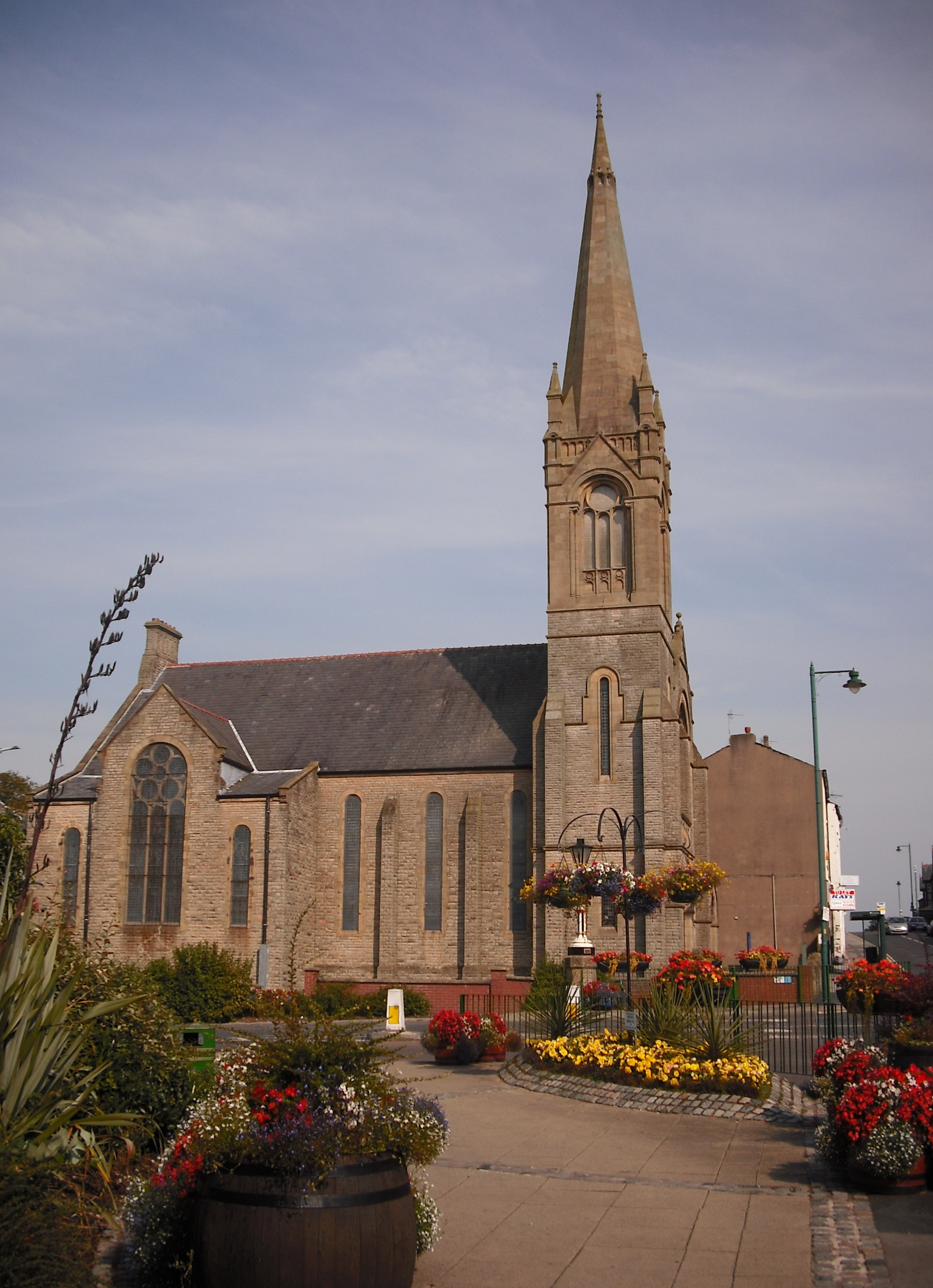
- Kirkham United Reformed Church

- Shown within Fylde Borough Shown within the Fylde Location within Lancashire
- Population: 7,883 (2021)
- OS grid reference: SD426321
- Civil parish: Kirkham
- District: Fylde
- Shire county: Lancashire
- Region: North West
- Country: England
- Sovereign state: United Kingdom
- Post town: PRESTON
- Postcode district: PR4
- Dialling code: 01772
- Police: Lancashire
- Fire: Lancashire
- Ambulance: North West
- UK Parliament: Fylde

Kirkham aka Kirkam-in-Amounderness is a market town and civil parish in the Borough of Fylde in Lancashire, England, midway between Blackpool and Preston and adjacent to the town of Wesham. It owes its existence to Carr Hill upon which it was built and which was the location of a Roman fort. At the census of 2011, it had a population 3,304 (Kirkham South) plus 3,890 (Kirkham North), giving a total of 7,194. By the census of 2021 the total had risen to 3,217 (Kirkham South) plus 4,666 (Kirkham North), giving a total of 7,883.

== History ==
In his 1878 History of the Fylde of Lancashire, John Porter described Kirkham as ".. probably the earliest inhabited locality in the Fylde district." Remains found at Carleton in the 1970s of an elk with two harpoons embedded suggest that the Fylde was inhabited as long ago as 8,000 BC.

The town is pre-Roman in its origin with a name originating from the Danish kirk (church) and -ham (Saxon for settlement, or "home"). The town owes its existence to Carr Hill upon which it was built and which was the location of a Roman fort. It appears in the Domesday Book of 1086 under the name of Chicheham and is described as lying on the Roman road between Ribchester (Bremetennacum) and the River Wyre. The town's market charter was granted in 1269–70 by King Henry III.

In the 15th and 16th centuries Kirkham remained a small market town. But from the late 17th century the town grew into a thriving textile centre. From 1830 sailcloth was being woven in cottages in the town and later at the Flax Mill, built in 1861 by John Birley. Kirkham Grammar School was founded in 1549 but the original building no longer exists.

In 1792 a Roman brass shield boss was discovered by local schoolmaster John Willacy, in the Dow Brook, in Mill Hill Field. Willacy sold the shield to a Scotsman, but it found its way to the Charles Townley collection in Burnley and from there to the British Museum. The oval shield, about 8 inches (20 cm) in diameter, bore the representation of a human figure, seated, with an eagle to the left and an athlete at the side.

Horse racing took place at Carr Hill in Kirkham in March 1852 and again in March 1853. Point-to-point races were still being staged at Thornley-with-Wheatley, near Preston, by the Kirkham Hunt in the 20th century, including a meeting on Friday 6 April 1900. Races at Carr Hill continued up to the start of World War II, but it is uncertain whether they began again after the war had ended.

In 1887 a memorial was erected, at Town End, to commemorate the Golden Jubilee of Queen Victoria. The memorial was later moved to a site adjacent to the United Reformed Church. It has an octagonal sandstone inscribed base on which is a decorative cast iron lamp post. This consists of a circular plinth carrying four twisted columns with a single capital. On this is a moulded shaft with a hexagonal lampshade. There is a plaque on the columns with details of a refurbishment in 1988.

Looms ran in the town from about 1850 until 2003. At one time the town had eleven mills, the last to be built being Progress Mill in 1915. On the lower part of Station Road "The Last Loom" of Kirkham is on permanent public display. This loom, a cross-rod type from the 1920s, with the use of tappets at the side, could produce an extensive range of fabrics including satins, twills, velvets and Bedford cord.

In 1925, Church Street became the subject of a pencil on paper drawing by Pendlebury artist L. S. Lowry. In his later "A Lancashire Village, 1935" he painted the scene again, but with a wider street full of people and a house in front of the church.

Due to an expansion of secondary education after World War II, Carr Hill Secondary Modern School (now part of an academy trust), was built in 1957 on the site of Carr Hill House and a former racecourse. It was officially opened in 1958 by the Duchess of Kent. Several housing developments have been built on the edge of the town since the late 20th century.

=== Governance ===
The town council for Kirkham is elected as a parish council, which has ten elected councillors and operates under the name "Kirkham Town Council". The mayor for 2025/2026 is Councillor Stewart Jones. The council also has a Town Clerk and Facilities Administrator.

Kirkham ward elects three councillors for the Borough of Fylde, which manages local services such as waste management, planning permission, community spaces and Council Tax. In the 2023 local elections the three seats were won by Edward Collins, Damian Buckley and Paul Hodgson (all Independent). In the 2026 local by-election, Adam Brierley (Conservative) was elected to replace Damian Buckley.

The Lancashire County Council councillor for the Fylde East division is Joshua Roberts (Reform UK).

=== Regeneration ===
Kirkham Futures was a four-year, £10m regeneration plan, led by Fylde Council's, in partnership with Lancashire County Council and Kirkham Town Council, which used a £6.3m grant from the Government's Future High Streets Fund (FHSF). In 2022 Fylde Borough Council purchased Grade II listed "Hillside" on Preston Street and the former Lloyds Bank on Poulton Street, as part of the plan. "Hillside" was a former restaurant and popular wedding venue and the former bank was originally a Charity Girls School dating back to 1860, but both buildings had been empty for some years. It was hoped the former bank could become a community cinema, but it is now a hospitality venue.

In January 2023, the town's Market Square closed for town centre improvements to be carried out, with a contract awarded to Eric Wright Civil Engineering Ltd. The Phase 1 Public Realm works replaced existing public realm and infrastructure, such as street furniture, in the area of Market Square and Poulton Street. Included in the contract is a five-year maintenance and repair commitment by the contractor, after which such upkeep would be included in existing revenue budgets. A lighting scheme was implemented in the square and will be maintained and repaired within the existing revenue budget provision.

In 2023-2024 a cooperative partnership funded a programme of events inspired by the former Roman presence in the area, allowing the community to participate in art and archaeology projects. Activities included a community archaeology project, a high street mural and a heritage-inspired art and lantern festival.

The improvement of the Market Square, following the £9.5M town centre regeneration plan, was completed in August 2024, with a parking ban introduced by Lancashire County Council. On 1 August 2026 Kirkham Pride was held at Market Square and later in the month a "Soul on the Square" event was held, featuring Motown and Northern Soul music.

== Education ==
Kirkham has two secondary schools: Carr Hill High School a mixed comprehensive school, and Kirkham Grammar School, an independent school. Feeding into these two schools are the primary schools of Kirkham: Kirkham and Wesham Primary School, Kirkham Grammar Junior School, St John the Evangelist (also known as "The Willows") Catholic Primary School and Kirkham St Michael's C of E Primary School. Additionally, Pear Tree School offers special education for children and young people, aged 2–19, with severe and profound and multiple learning difficulties.

== Churches ==
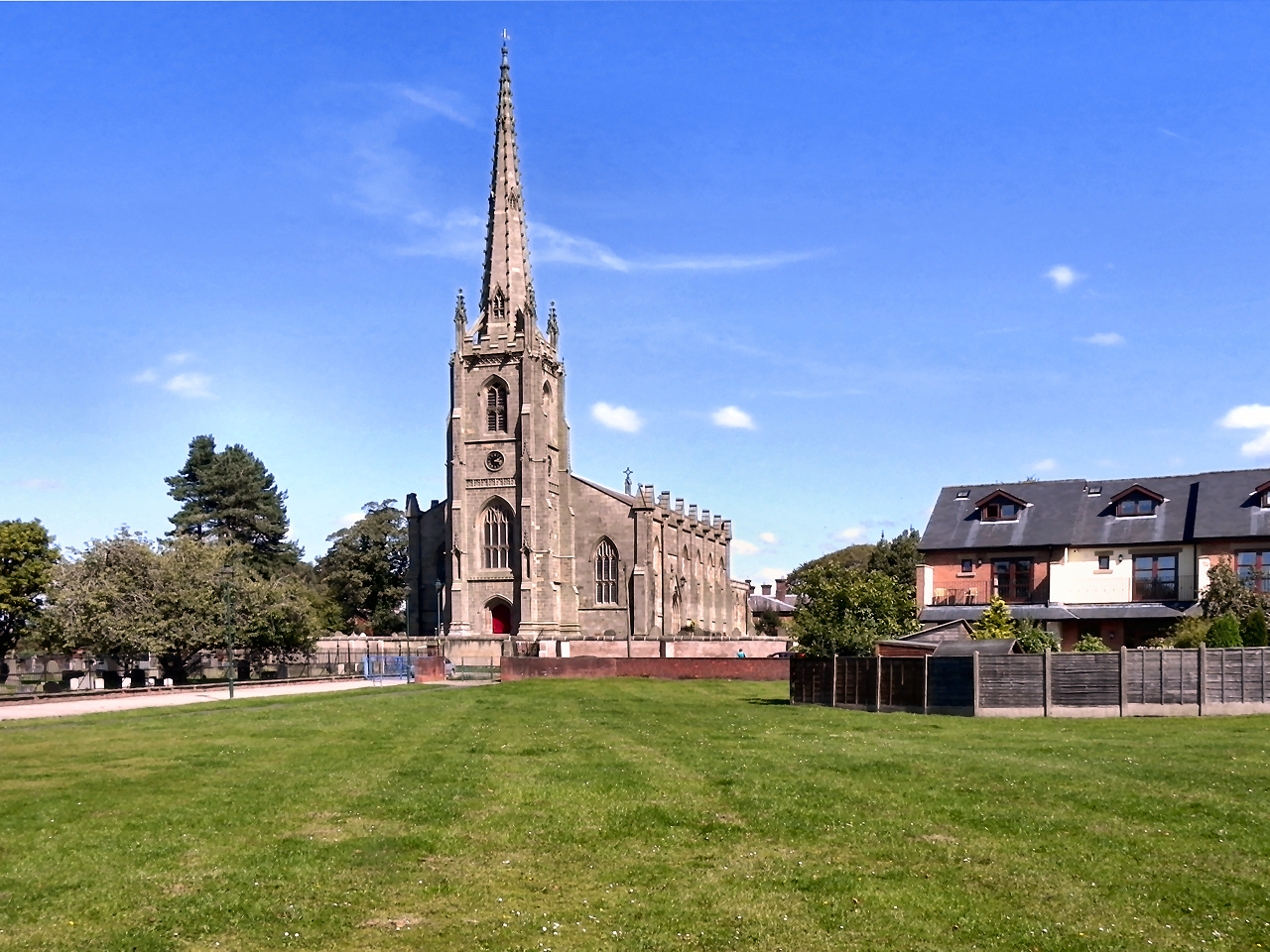
St Michael's Church, 2011

The Church of England parish church is St Michael's whose minister is Fr Richard Dashwood.

The United Reformed Church on Poulton Street is a Grade II listed building and is an early example of the work of the architectural practice of Briggs & Wolstenholme. It has a "massing and prominent spire rising from a tall tower" and was built in 1896. In 1995 a large single-storey rear extension, including a basement, was built to accommodate a youth centre, meeting rooms, kitchen and toilets. In about 2000 the vestibule was extended forward to the same level as the balcony above.

There is also a Roman Catholic church – St John the Evangelist, built in 1845, but known locally as "The Willows" – on the Ribby Road, and a Methodist church on Nelson Street.

Zion (Independent) Chapel was founded in 1818. Although the church has long since been demolished, the graveyard remains. Now associated with Kirkham United Reformed Church, but adjacent to the Manse Nursing Home in the centre of the town, this unusual isolated burial-ground is still well maintained.

== Location and amenities ==
Kirkham lies at the centre of a relatively rich agricultural area. By the mid 18th century, however, the manufacture of sail cloth and the flax-weaving industry had become well established in the town. By 1876 there were several factories employing almost 1,000 workers in the cotton and other industries and by the end of the century the town had grown considerably in importance.

Kirkham and Wesham railway station was opened in 1840 as "Kirkham Station", when the Preston and Wyre Railway and Harbour Company opened its line to Fleetwood. South of the town is Kirkham Prison, an open prison built on part of the site of the Royal Air Force base which closed in 1957.

The small library located on Station Road has been open since 1939 and has been given a major refurbishment.

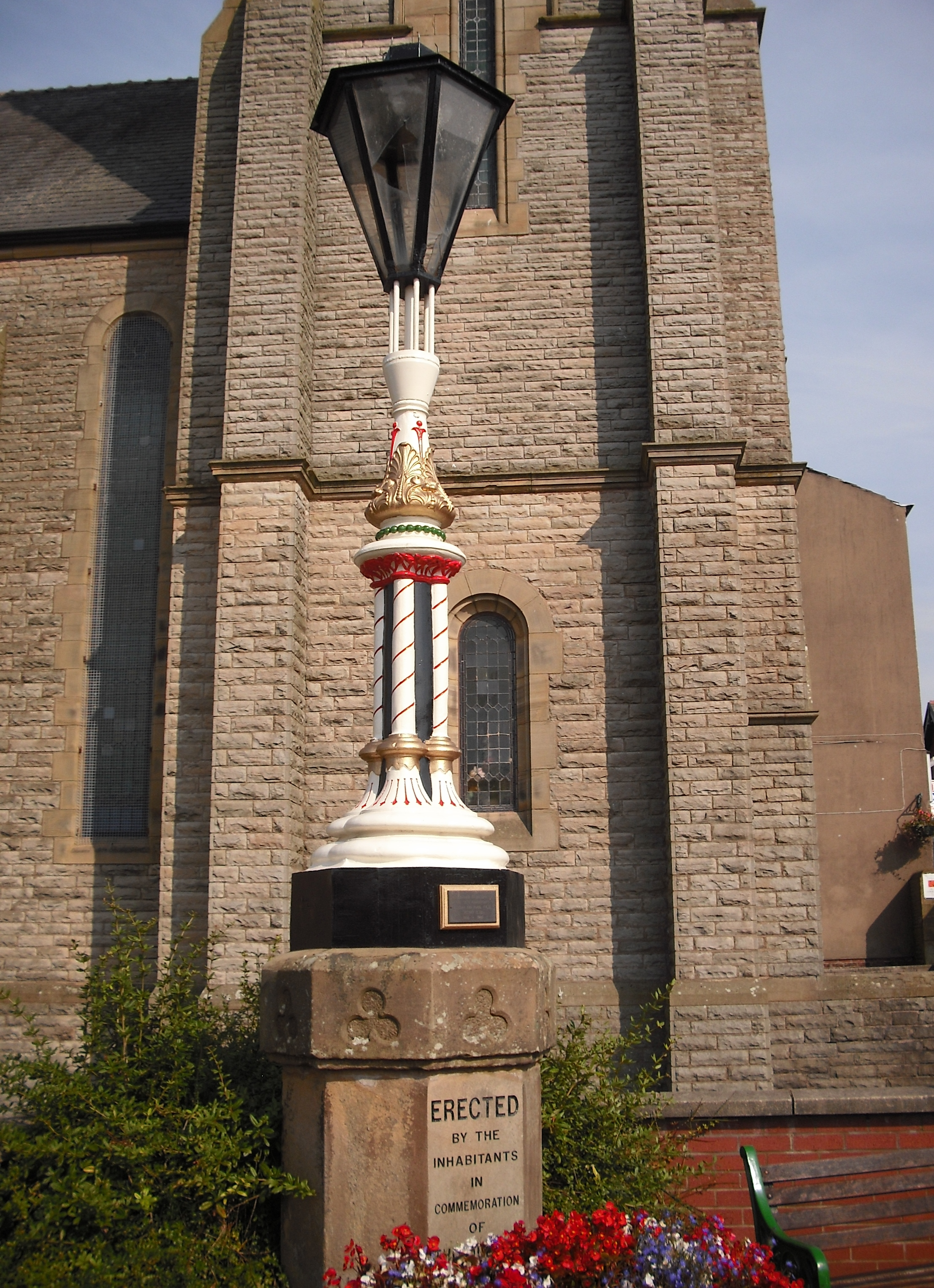
Queen Victoria Jubilee Memorial, Poulton Street

Kirkham Club Day, an annual gala, is held in early June, jointly with Wesham. The day involves the various churches and their chosen "Rose Queens", together with biblical tableau floats, civic dignitaries and brass bands, walking in procession through the town in the morning.

The town's War Memorial is located in a small memorial garden on Barnfield.

The St George Hotel was situated at the bottom on Station Road, at Town End, but closed in 2011 and was demolished in 2012 to make way for a block of flats.

Following the closure of last remaining bank branch, for Yorkshire Building Society, the town made use of a temporary shared banking hub at Hodgson Pavilion on Coronation Road. In April 2026 a purpose-built permanent hub was opened at 71–73 Poulton Street.

== Media ==
Local news and television programmes are provided by BBC North West and ITV Granada. Television signals are received from the Winter Hill TV transmitter.

Local radio stations are BBC Radio Lancashire, Heart North West, Smooth North West, Capital Manchester and Lancashire, Greatest Hits Radio Lancashire and Central Radio (Lancashire), a community based station which broadcast from Preston.

The town is served by its own free newspaper, the Kirkham and Wesham Advertiser. Both the Blackpool Gazette and the Lancashire Post cover Kirkham news, as does the weekly Kirkham and Fylde Express.

== Sport ==
Kirkham Swimming Baths, erected in 1914 by the bequest of William Segar Hodgson, served Kirkham as a public swimming pool for over a century. In February 2008 a campaign was initiated to save the baths from closure which included a public march of some 3,000 local supporters through Kirkham and Wesham. A local action group, formed to support the survival of the baths, presented a business plan to Fylde Borough Council and the baths were then run by the YMCA, having been re-branded as "Rural Splash". The baths closed permanently after suffering significant structural damage caused by Storm Arwen in December 2021. In December 2024 CIC Wave Reach withdrew from its role in acquiring and operating Kirkham Pool. In June 2025 Fylde Borough Council regained ownership of the pool for the nominal sum of £1. In January 2026 a £9.3 million investment was approved by the council. In August 2026 the council announced it was working with Places Leisure to deliver a reconditioned pool, new fitness suite, and refurbished changing rooms, planned to open in 2028.

The town's football club is AFC Fylde. The club was known as Kirkham and Wesham F.C until the end of the 2007–08 season, and was formed by the amalgamation of Kirkham Town F.C. and Wesham F.C. The change of name to AFC Fylde was made with the intention of encouraging a broader fan-base from across the Fylde coast.

AFC Fylde is based at the Mill Farm Sports Village, north of Wesham, and plays in the National League. The team won the FA Vase in the 2007–08 season, defeating Lowestoft Town in the final at Wembley Stadium on 11 May 2008. They were also promoted to the North West Counties Football League Premier Division after finishing second in Division Two. In 2008–09 they were North West Counties Football League champions, winning promotion to the Northern Premier League Division One North.

In May 2022 the British Lawn Mower Racing Association staged a meeting at Sunfield Farm, off Freckleton Road, to help to raise money for the people of Ukraine.

== Twin towns ==
Kirkham is twinned with both Ancenis in Loire-Atlantique, France and Bad Brückenau, a spa town in Bad Kissingen district, northern Bavaria which is situated in the Rhön Mountains in Germany. Kirkham has an active Twinning Association and has regular contact with both Ancenis and Bad Brückenau.

== Places of interest ==
Kirkham currently has 20 listed buildings, one of them being Grade II* and the rest being Grade II. Many of the buildings in the town centre date from the Georgian and Victorian eras. Notable examples include:

- "Hillside", Preston Street, former restaurant and wedding venue
- Kirkham United Reformed Church, Poulton Street
- Kirkham Windmill, Dowbridge, now a private dwelling
- St John the Evangelist, Ribby Road, R.C. church, known locally as The Willows
- St Michaels Church, Kirkham, Church Street, Anglican parish church
- Ash Tree House, formerly a private dwelling, built c.1765, Church Street, is now a general practice

== Notable people ==
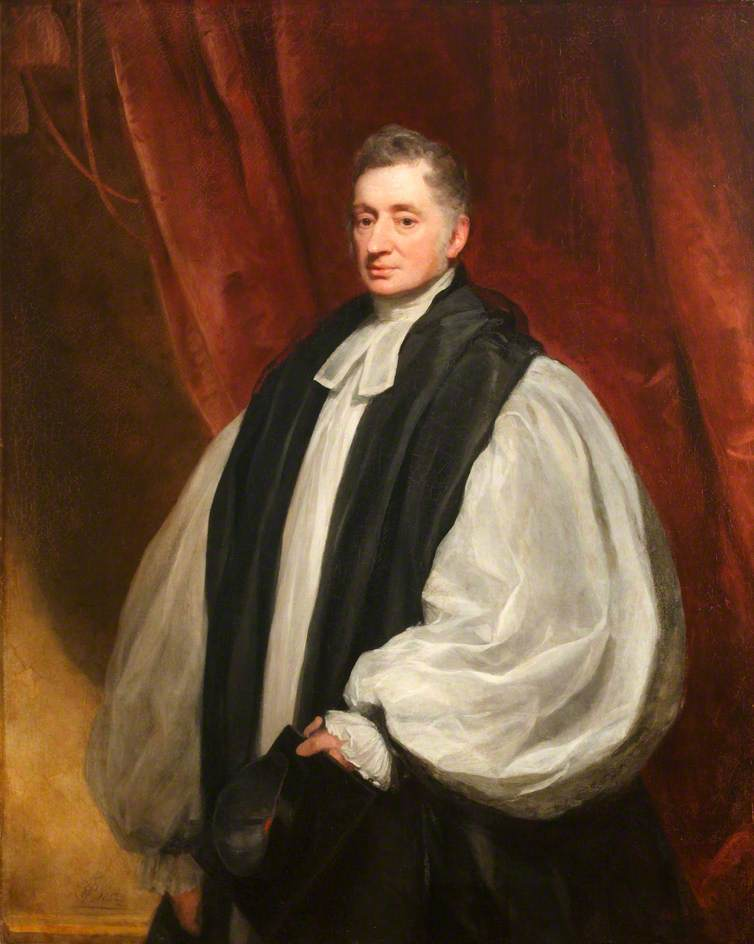
Philip Shuttleworth, 1842

- John Whiteside (1679–1729), chaplain, museum curator, experimental philosopher and astronomer.
- Philip Shuttleworth (1782–1842), an English churchman and academic, Bishop of Chichester.
- Harry Hodgkinson (1913–1994), writer, journalist, naval intelligence officer and expert on the Balkans.

=== Sport ===
- George Wilson (1892–1961), footballer who played 428 games and 12 for England
- Fred Marquis (1899–1957), footballer who played 70 games for Tranmere Rovers.
- William Roberts (1914–1951), cricketer, played 119 First-class cricket matches
